= List of glider pilots =

This list of notable glider pilots contains the names of those who have achieved fame in gliding and in other fields:

== Notable in gliding ==
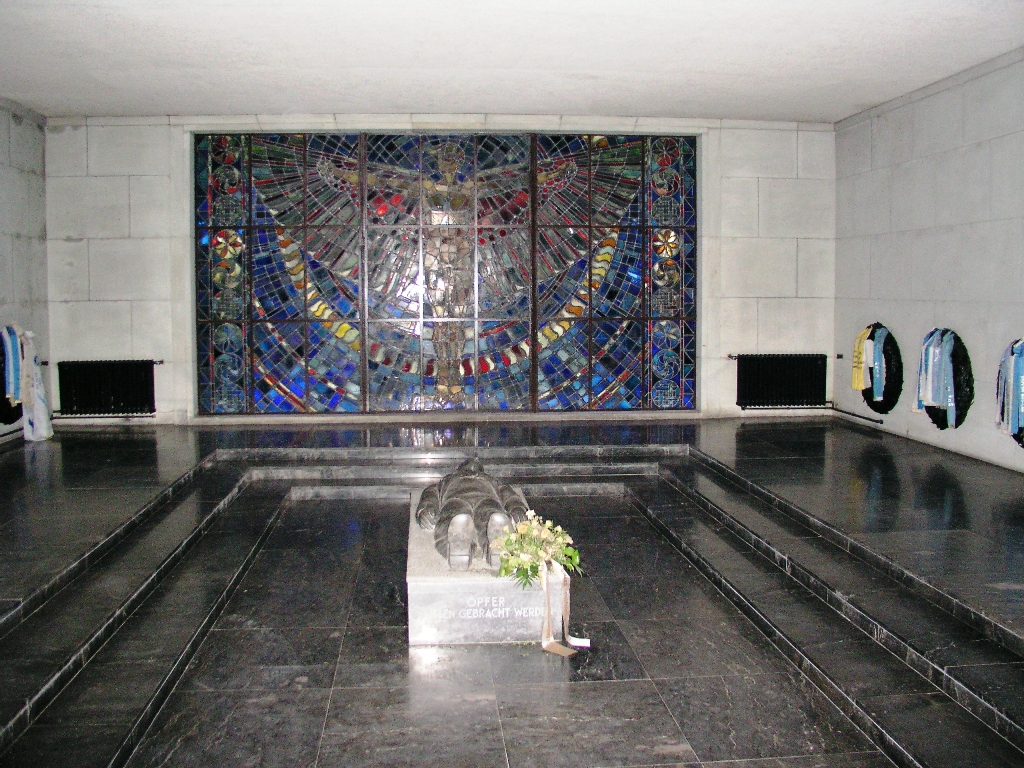
The "Ehrenhalle" at the Wasserkuppe, featuring a larger than life statue of Otto Lilienthal lying on an empty tomb, a tribute to all who have died in gliding.

- Ruth Alexander - female altitude record breaker, first woman glider instructor in the U.S.
- Sergei Anokhin - test pilot, Hero of the Soviet Union, glider instructor, recordsman and gliding promoter in the USSR and Turkey, on October 2, 1934, carried out a flutter test with deliberate in-flight destruction of RotFront-1 glider and safe parachute escape after the glider disintegration.
- Bill Bedford test pilot - first to fly Hawker P.1127 and Harrier.
- Luca Bertossio - Champion glider aerobatic pilot
- Paul Bikle - NASA director, glider altitude record setter and Soaring Hall of Fame
- William Hawley Bowlus - first American to break Wright brothers' 1911 gliding record, designer of first military prototype glider the XCG-16A, superintendent of construction of the Spirit of St. Louis and U.S. Soaring Hall of Fame member

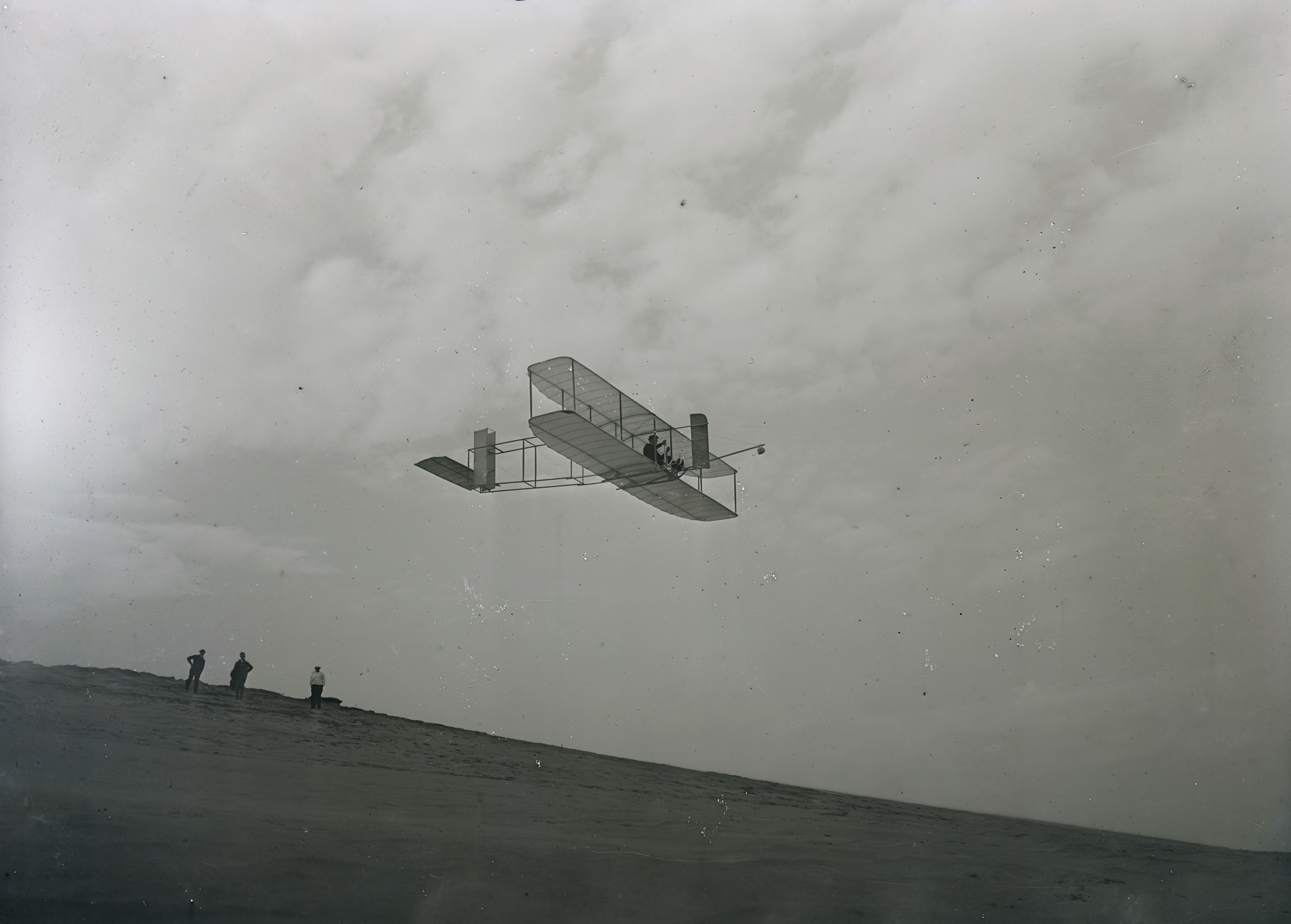
October 24, 1911: Orville Wright soared above Kill Devil Hill for 9 minutes 45 seconds, breaking their previous record of 1 minute 12 seconds set in January 1903 with the 1902 glider.

- Anne Burns - British champion, holder of multiple records, aerospace engineer
- Janusz Centka - multiple world champion
- Jackie Coogan - actor, former WW2-era combat Glider Pilot
- Adela Dankowska - held 12 world records and 43 Polish records during her career
- Anthony Deane-Drummond - major-general & British national champion
- Heini Dittmar - test pilot (first person over 1000 km/h) and gliding record breaker
- Wilhelm Düerkop - glider aerobatic champion
- Richard C. du Pont - director of military glider program
- Einar Enevoldson - test pilot and gliding record breaker
- Markus Feyerabend - glider aerobatics champion
- Steve Fossett - entrepreneur and gliding record breaker
- Nicholas Goodhart - world champion, record breaker and inventor of the Mirror sight deck landing system
- Tadeusz Góra - gliding record breaker, first winner of the Lilienthal Gliding Medal
- Hans-Werner Grosse - 46 world records
- Doris Grove - female world record breaker, first woman to fly 1000 km, and U.S. Soaring Hall of Fame member
- Julius Hatry - glider designer
- Barron Hilton - hotel magnate and founder of the Barron Hilton Cup for gliding
- Wolf Hirth - German gliding pioneer and sailplane designer
- Klaus Holighaus - glider designer and European Champion
- Hans Jacobs - glider designer
- Sabrina Jackintell - Women's World Altitude Record Holder
- Dick Johnson - 11-time U.S. National Champion, glider distance record setter and Soaring Hall of Fame
- Sebastian Kawa - most wins (5+3) in World Gliding Championships
- Joachim Kuettner - atmospheric scientist and gliding record breaker
- Thomas Knauff - author, instructor, world record breaker, and U.S. Soaring Hall of Fame member
- Robert Kronfeld - Austrian gliding champion and sailplane designer
- Jean-Marie Le Bris - pioneer of French aviation
- George Lee - three time world champion, ex-RAF
- Otto Lilienthal - German machine engineer, first controlled gliding flights to 250 m
- Paul MacCready - aviation inventor, devised the MacCready Theory on speed to fly
- Edward Makula - world champion, 7 world records
- Jerzy Makula - six time world glider aerobatic champion
- Peter Masak - U.S. Soaring Team member, developed the first practical winglets for sailplanes
- Mike Melvill - Spaceship One test pilot, first commercial astronaut
- Willy Messerschmitt, aircraft designer, including gliders
- George Moffat - author, two-time world champion, and U.S. Soaring Hall of Fame member
- John J. Montgomery - U.S. physicist, first controlled glider flight in U.S., and U.S. Soaring Hall of Fame member
- Story Musgrave - astronaut on a Hubble Space Telescope repair mission, CFI-Glider
- Klaus Ohlmann - 36 world records, member of the Mountain Wave Project
- Derek Piggott - author, flight instructor and movie stunt pilot
- Joan Meakin Price - first woman to glide over the English Channel (1934).
- Helmut Reichmann - German professor, author and three-time gliding world champion
- Hanna Reitsch - test pilot and breaker of several gliding records
- Ingo Renner - four time world champion, two world records, flight instructor
- Peter Riedel - gliding champion
- Cliff Robertson - actor and soaring activist
- Martin Schempp - glider designer and pilot
- Richard Schreder - naval aviator and developer of the HP/RS-series kit sailplanes marketed from 1962 until about 1982.
- Peter Scott - naturalist (founder of World Wildlife Fund and ex-chairman of British Gliding Association)
- Wally Scott - world record breaker, U.S. Soaring Hall of Fame member, and multi-time recipient of the Lewin B. Barringer Memorial Trophy
- Geoffrey H. Stephenson - first person to cross the English Channel in a glider
- Strachan, Ian - awarded the FAI Lilienthal medal for Chairing the IGC GPS Flight Recorder Approval Committee (GFAC) for over 20 years since its creation, and other gliding achievements including twice being UK Standard Class gliding champion.
- Karl Striedieck - world record breaker, and U.S. Soaring Hall of Fame member
- Wolfgang Späte - Inventor of the theory of speed to fly, Luftwaffe ace and test pilot
- Kurt Student - Luftwaffe general, developed glider infantry concept, commanded WW2-era Fallschirmjäger
- Dennis Tito - gliding speed record holder, aerospace engineer and investment manager
- Oskar Ursinus - gliding pioneer and designer
- Gerhard Waibel - glider pilot and designer
- Ann Welch - instructor and administrator
- Philip Wills - world champion and administrator
- Wright Brothers - early glider pioneers, invented 3-axis flight control on 1902 glider, set world glider duration record in 1911 (also widely credited with inventing the airplane)
- Jan Wróblewski - World Champion in 1965 and 1972; FAI Lilienthal Medal 1972

== Other notable people known to have flown gliders ==
- Sir John Allison - RAF Officer, former Commander in Chief Strike Command
- James Allison - F1 Engineer, Technical Director Scuderia Ferrari
- Neil Armstrong - first man on the moon, astronaut
- Richard Bach - author
- Wernher von Braun - American-German aerospace engineer
- Paul Bulcke - Nestlé CEO (2007–present)
- Barbara Cartland - author
- Kalpana Chawla - astronaut
- John Denver - singer/songwriter
- Hugh Downs - television news anchor
- Norman Foster, Baron Foster of Thames Bank - British architect
- Matthew Fox - actor
- Christopher Foyle - owner of Foyles Bookshop
- Andy Green - World Land Speed Record holder
- Erich Hartmann - most successful fighter pilot of all times (352 confirmed victories)
- Will Hay - British comic actor
- Ralph Hooper - British aeronautical engineer famous for the Hawker Siddeley Harrier and BAe Hawk
- L. Ron Hubbard - founder of the Church of Scientology
- Marsha Ivins - astronaut
- Sir David Jason - actor
- Amy Johnson - pioneer in aviation, member at Yorkshire Gliding Club from 1937
- John Kerry - U.S. Senator and former presidential candidate
- Sergei Korolev - father of the Soviet space program
- Charles Lindbergh - winner of the Orteig Prize as pilot on first solo nonstop Atlantic crossing flight
- William S. McArthur - astronaut
- Richie McCaw - former All Blacks captain
- Steve McQueen - actor, star of The Thomas Crown Affair (1968 film)
- Arseny Mironov - Russian aerospace engineer and aviator, scientist in aircraft aerodynamics and flight testing
- James H. Newman - astronaut, holds private pilot certificate (glider)
- Sir Paul Nurse - President of the Royal Society
- Robert Pearson - airline pilot and glider pilot who glided a Boeing 767 to safety
- Christopher Reeve - actor
- Michel Rocard - French former prime minister.
- Martin Shaw - actor
- Alan Shepard - astronaut on first Project Mercury space flight
- Chesley Sullenberger - captain of US Airways Flight 1549 which ditched in the Hudson River
- Peter Twiss - test pilot and former holder of the World Air Speed Record
