= Marcelle Choisnet =

French aviator

Marcelle Hélène Choisnet (also known as Marcelle Choisnet-Gohard; 9 May 1914 – 14 July 1974) was a French aviator, the first woman to be awarded the Lilienthal Gliding Medal.

== Early life ==
Marcelle Hélène Choisnet was born in Versailles, Yvelines, France on 9 May 1914. Her father worked for SNCF, France's national state-owned railway company, and the family were not well off. Choisnet was seriously injured in an accident at the age of nine, and took some years to recover. She later worked as a seamstress.

== Aviation ==
She became interested in aviation and started to take flying lessons however the cost proved prohibitive. Instead, she took up gliding, training as a glider pilot in the late 1930s. She was a second lieutenant in the French Air Force in 1940-1942 but left the military after a period of training in France and Morocco.

== Records and awards ==
After the Second World War, Choisnet achieved a number of national and international female gliding records, thirty French records and eleven world records, in the categories of time, distance and altitude, whether in both single or double seater gliders.These included:

- 21 July 1945, international women's record for distance with a fixed goal. She left the Beynes - Thiverval airfield at 13:07 and reached her destination: Soignies at 17:504, 253 km.
- 25 March 1947: with J. Rousseau, on a DFS Kranich II glider, women's national record for altitude gain: 2,083 m.
- 17 November 1948: women's record for duration with 35 hrs 03 min, in an Arsenal Air 100 No. 5 glider.
- 27 June 1949: national and international women's record for distance in a closed circuit over the course Fès-BouBéker - Fès (Morocco), i.e. 151 km on board a Nord 2000 glider.
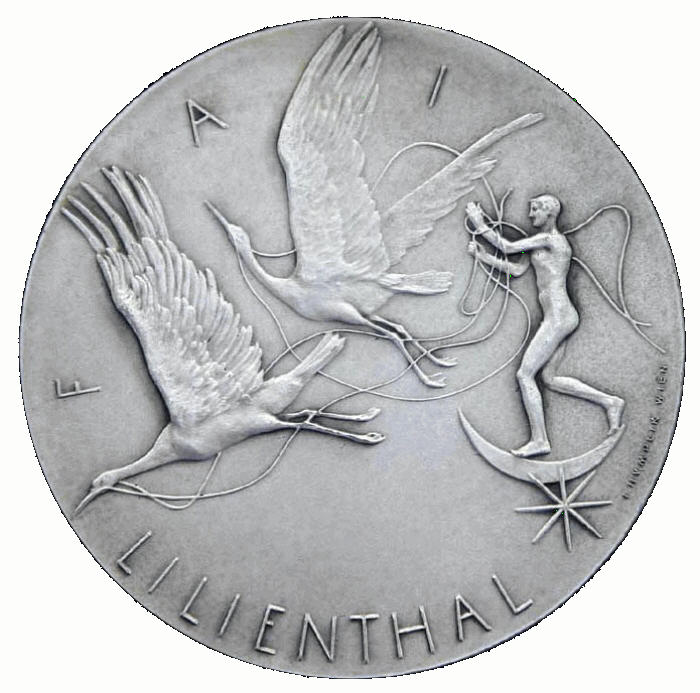
- Lilienthal medal-obverse
  20 July 1950: in her Air 100 No. 14 glider, she set a women's distance record with a goal set at 210 km at an average speed of 36 km/h and a women's record for distance with a fixed goal and return to the starting point of 203.150 km.
- 18 January 1951: with Miss Queyrel, on a Castel-Mauboussin CM7 No. 2 glider, women's altitude gain record with 6,072 metres.
- 22 November 1951: with Miss Mazelier, on a Castel-Mauboussin CM7 glider, women's record for duration with 28 h 51 min
- 12 May 1953: women's world record for distance with a fixed goal and return to the starting point, on her Air 100 Gondolo "CG" glider, with 290 km
- 17 April 1954: Air 100 glider No. 14, set a distance record with fixed goal of 507.052 km
- In May 1954, she broke the women's fixed-wing distance record with 510 km on board an Air 102.

In 1951, Choisnet was awarded the Lilienthal Gliding Medal, the first woman to receive the award from Fédération Aéronautique Internationale (FAI), based on the votes of delegates to the annual International Gliding Commission. Only six other women have received the award since, Pelagia Majewska (1960), Anne Burns (1966), Ann Welch (1970), Adela Dankowska (1975) Hana Zejdova (1999) and Gisela Weinreich (2020).

== Personal life ==
Choisnet married a fellow pilot, Jacques Gohard, and was sometimes known as Marcelle Choisnet-Gohard.

Marcelle Hélène Choisnet died in a gliding accident at Chartres on 14 July 1974.

She was buried in the cemetery at Beynes, Yvelines.
