= FAI Gliding Commission =

International governing body for gliding

FAI-IGC Logo

The International Gliding Commission (IGC) is the international governing body for the sport of gliding. It is governed by meetings of delegates from national gliding associations.

It is one of several Air Sport Commissions (ASC) of the Fédération Aéronautique Internationale (FAI), or "World Air Sports Federation". FAI is the world body for sporting aviation and the certification of world records for aeronautics and astronautics and was founded in 1905.

When the IGC was founded in 1932, it was called CIVV (Commission Internationale de Vol à Voile) and has also been called CVSM (Commission de Vol Sans Moteur). It is the FAI commission responsible for the international competitions, records and badges that apply to gliders and motor gliders. The term "sailplanes" is sometimes used. Hang gliders and paragliders have a separate body called the FAI CIVL Commission, which stands for "Commission Internationale de Vol Libre".

The World Gliding Championships are organised every two years or so by the FAI Gliding Commission and the host nation.

Within FAI, the sport of glider aerobatics is managed by the FAI Aerobatics Commission (CIVA), which stands for "Commission Internationale de Voltige Aérienne" and also deals with powered-aircraft aerobatics

== Badges ==
In the early 1920s two flying organizations, the Association of the German Model and Gliding Clubs, and the Rhön Soaring Association, determined that pilots would be listed as "A" level if they flew a glider for either 300 meters or 30 seconds, and "B" level if they made two flights of 45 seconds in straight lines plus one of 60 seconds in an "S" pattern. (It should be remembered that these flights were made by bungee cord launches down hillsides.) In time a "C" level, requiring a five-minute flight, was added. A few years later Fritz Stamer, chief flight instructor of an early gliding school, designed the gull insignia which were used for these awards and later for the badges.

The C badge: three stylized gulls on a blue disc, a design created by Fritz Stamer at the Wasserkuppe gliding school in the early 1920s

ISTUS (Internationale Studienkommission für motorlosen Flug), was founded in Frankfurt on 13 June 1930, to record international gliding achievements. The founding nations were Belgium, France, the Netherlands, Hungary, Germany, Italy, and the USA. A series of badges for solo gliding was devised called A, B, C, D etc.

Later the D badge became known as the Silver C, and more often today just the Silver Badge. Earning the Silver Badge shows that a glider pilot has achieved an altitude gain of at least 1,000 m, made a five-hour duration flight, and has flown cross-country for a straight-line distance of at least 50 km: these three attainments are usually, but not invariably, achieved in separate flights. The first recipients of the Silver C were Wolf Hirth and Robert Kronfeld on 15 February 1931.

In 1932 the FAI recognized gliding, and formed a new section: the Commission Internationale de Vol à Voile (CIVV). This eventually took over the role of ISTUS. The FAI decided that the Silver C was sufficiently meritorious to be internationally recognised, and issued the first 300 before turning the awarding over to the national societies. From the beginning the lesser badges were only recorded by local gliding associations, and their criteria varies, although they are usually integrated into organized training programs. For example, in the United States a Bronze Badge is issued for demonstrated pre-cross country flying skills beyond the C level. In Britain a pilot progresses from the B to the Bronze level and then receives an additional endorsement for cross-country training.

The E badge (later called the Gold C and now usually just the Gold Badge) was established in 1935. A pilot who has completed the Gold Badge has flown 300 km, though not necessarily to a pre-defined goal, gained 3,000 m in height and has made a five-hour flight (only one has to be done to count for both the Silver and Gold). Up to this level the badges are registered only by the national gliding associations.

The F Badge (now the Diamond Badge) started in 1949. The Diamond Badge requires three achievements: flying 300 km to a pre-defined goal, going 500 km in one flight (but not necessarily to a pre-defined goal), and gaining 5,000 m in height. Earning all three "diamonds" qualifies the pilot for the FAI registry as a Diamond Badge holder. The first pilot with the Diamond Badge was the American, John Robinson, in 1950, who had also held the absolute altitude record. Over 7600 people have achieved this level. The FAI also issues a diploma for a flight of 750 km, and additional ones in increments of 250 km, maintaining lists of the holders of these awards. As of 2019 six people had been awarded a 2000 km diploma

FAI Gliding Commission Badges
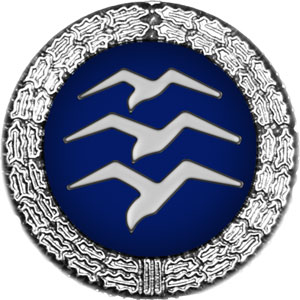
Silver Badge

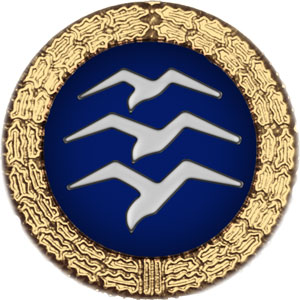
Gold Badge

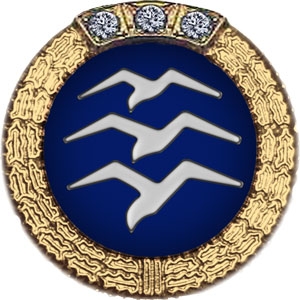
Diamond Badge

== Gliding records ==
The wide variety of records have been defined by the FAI Gliding Commission. The classes of glider have been combined into four groups: Open, 15 metre, World Class and Ultralight. Although female pilots can claim world records in these general categories, there are also additional records in these categories just for female pilots. Because of the number of records the table below only summarises some of the Open Category gliding records as at the beginning of 2008. A full list is available on the FAI web site.

=== Open class records ===
Category	Record	Date	Pilot	Crew	Place	Glider
Free distance	2,192.9 km	2004-12-04	Terrence Delore; NZL	Steve Fossett; USA	El Calafate; Argentina	Schleicher ASH 25 Mi
Free out-and-return-distance	2,247 km	2003-12-03	Klaus Ohlmann; Germany		Chapelco; Argentina	Schempp-Hirth Nimbus-4DM
Free distance using up to 3 turn points	3,009 km	2003-01-21	Klaus Ohlmann; Germany		Chapelco; Argentina	Schempp-Hirth Nimbus-4DM
Distance using up to 3 turn points	2,643.2 km	2009-12-28	Klaus Ohlmann; Germany	Sidonie Ohlmann; France	Chapelco; Argentina	Schempp-Hirth Nimbus-4DM
Distance over a triangular course (see below)	1,750.6 km	2011-01-12	Klaus Ohlmann; Germany	Anssi Soila; Finland	Chapelco; Argentina	Schempp-Hirth Nimbus-4DM
Speed over a triangular course of 100 km	289.4 km/h	2006-12-18	Klaus Ohlmann; Germany	Esteban Fechino; Argentina	Zapala; Argentina	Schempp-Hirth Nimbus-4DM
Speed over a triangular course of 300 km	225.69 km/h	2005-11-21	Klaus Ohlmann; Germany		Chos Malal; Argentina	Schempp-Hirth Nimbus-4DM
Speed over a triangular course of 500 km	194.79 km/h	2005-11-23	Klaus Ohlmann; Germany	Kathrin Woetzel; Germany	Chos Malal; Argentina	Schempp-Hirth Nimbus-4DM
Absolute Altitude	23,202 m	2018-09-2	Jim Payne; USA	Tim Gardner; USA	El Calafate; Argentina	Windward Performance Perlan II
Gain of Height	12,894 m	1961-02-25	Paul F. Bikle; USA		Fox Airport, Lancaster, California; United States	Schweizer SGS 1-23 E

=== Discontinued records ===
Class	Category	Record	Date	Pilot	Crew	Place	Glider
Single seat	Duration	56h 15mn	1952-04-02	Charles Atger France		Romanin-les-Alpilles; France	Arsenal Air 100

== GNSS flight recorders ==
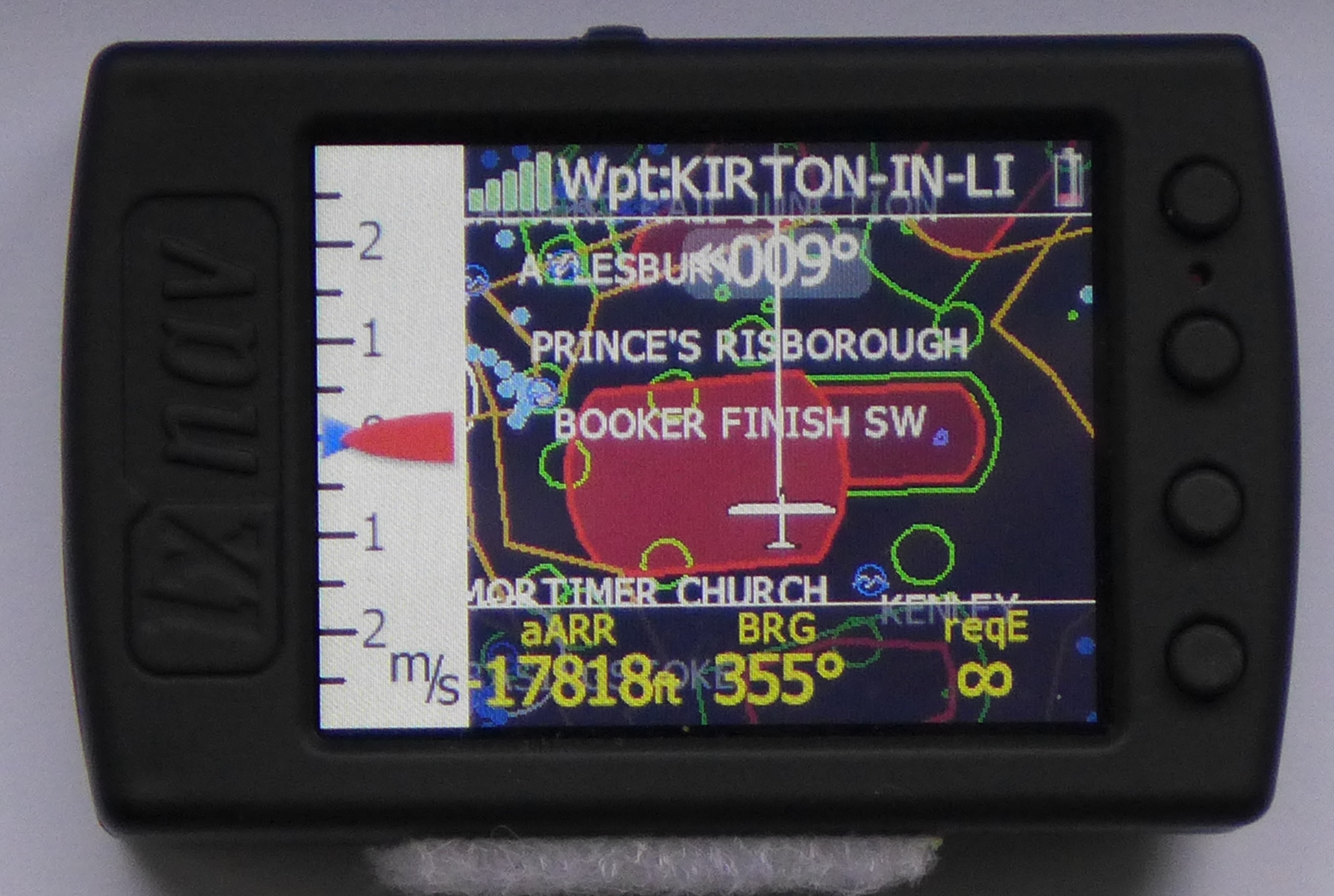
LXNav Nano 3 flight recorder

With the advent of satellite navigation equipment at an affordable price, the International Gliding Commission of FAI developed a technical specification for flight recorders.

IGC-approved flight recorders provide precise evidence of position for gliding competitions, national and world records. They replaced photographic evidence or ground-based observers to record aircraft position at turning points in glider cross country flying. IGC-approved flight recorders include a pressure altitude sensor and a Global Navigation Satellite System (GNSS) receiver that records "fixes" in Latitude and Longitude and GPS Altitude.

Data output is in a standard ASCII-based format, the "IGC flight data format". This is used in files with the suffix "IGC" that is specified in detail in Appendix A of the document "Technical Specification for IGC-approved GNSS Flight Recorders". Organisations outside IGC also use IGC-approved flight recorders and the IGC flight data file format.

In IGC-approved recorders, GNSS and pressure altitude data is continuously recorded during flight in fixes stored in non-volatile memory inside the recorder. Typical fix intervals, set by the pilot before flight, are 5 seconds for "cruising" flight between turn points, and 1 second near turn points or other points of interest.

Pressure altitude figures must be calibrated to the International pressure/altitude values of the ICAO ISA (International Standard Atmosphere). Re-calibrations to check any errors from the ICAO ISA are carried out at regular intervals.

GNSS lat/long data records the track over ground and in particular whether a particular turn point (TP) has been reached.

GNSS altitude data can be compared with pressure altitude data from the recorder and this is a valuable check that both systems are working correctly.

In March 1995, IGC created the "GNSS FR Approval Committee" (GFAC) to test recorders and co-ordinate IGC rules, and Annex B to the Sporting Code for gliders (SC3B) was created for FR rules and procedures. GFAC also issues IGC-approval documents for approved types of FR that are posted on the IGC GNSS web site.

For IGC-approval, the recorder design includes a security code in the downloaded file of flight data. This code and the file data itself can be checked ("validated") at any time later using a validation program that is posted on the IGC GNSS web site.

This validation program checks three things:

1. That the file has originated from an approved type of recorder,
2. That the recorder has not been altered from its IGC-approved state,
3. That the data in the downloaded file that is being validated is identical to when it was originally downloaded from the recorder.

A public/private key (PPK) encryption system such as RSA or equivalent is used to achieve the validation process above. IGC-approved Recorders also have a security device such as a microswitch that operates if the recorder is opened. This enables unauthorised modification to the recorder to be detected and protects the integrity of its output data.

There are three levels of IGC-approval:

1. All flights including world records
2. All Badge and Diploma fights
3. Badge Flights up to Diamonds

These are allocated by GFAC depending on factors such as the security of the type of FR with respect to the latest IGC FR Specification, the age of the FR design and experience of its characteristics, and the integrity of FR flight data and its resistance to "hacking".

== OSTIV ==
An associated body is Organisation Scientifique et Technique du Vol à Voile (OSTIV) which facilitates contact between glider manufacturers and pilots to share experience and opinion

== Awards ==
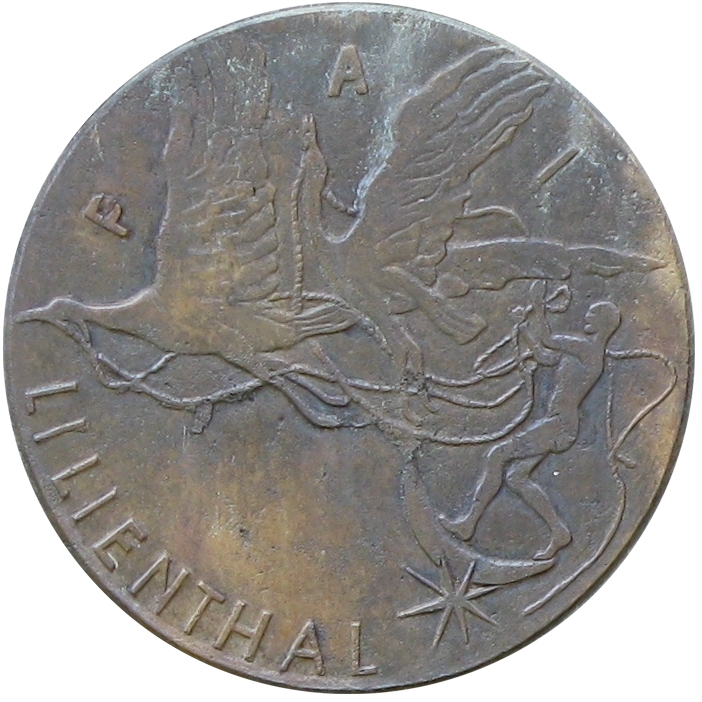
Lilienthal medal

The Commission makes awards for great achievements and meritorious service. For gliding it presents:

- The Lilienthal Gliding Medal
- Pelagia Majewska Gliding Medal (for female pilots)
- The Pirat Gehriger Diploma (for services to international gliding)

The Lilienthal Medal was instituted in 1938 "to reward a particularly remarkable performance in gliding, or eminent services to the sport of gliding over a long period of time". The first recipient was Tadeusz Góra in recognition of his 577.8 km flight. Its recipients include:

- Paul Bikle
- Anne Burns
- Janusz Centka
- Tadeusz Góra
- Hans-Werner Grosse
- Wolf Hirth
- Dick Johnson
- George Lee
- Paul MacCready
- Edward Makula
- George B. Moffat Jr.
- Klaus Ohlmann
- Derek Piggott
- Helmut Reichmann
- Ingo Renner
- Richard Schreder
- Karl Striedieck
- Ann Welch
- Philip Wills
