= Ann Welch =

Ann Courtenay Welch
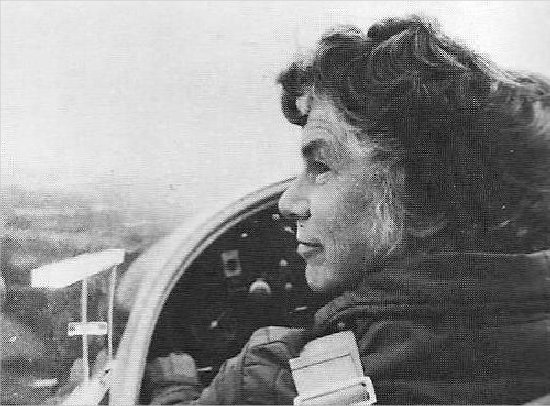
- in a glider, 1960
- Born: Ann Courtenay Edmonds; 20 May 1917; London
- Died: 5 December 2002 (aged 85)
- Occupation: Pilot
- Employer: Air Transport Auxiliary

Ann Courtenay Welch OBE, née Edmonds, (20 May 1917 – 5 December 2002) was a pilot who received the Gold Air Medal from Fédération Aéronautique Internationale (FAI) for her contributions to the development of four air sports - gliding, hang gliding, paragliding and microlight flying.

She flew as a ferry pilot in the Air Transport Auxiliary during the Second World War. including flying the Hurricane, Spitfire, and multi-engined aircraft, details later under "WW II".

== Early life ==
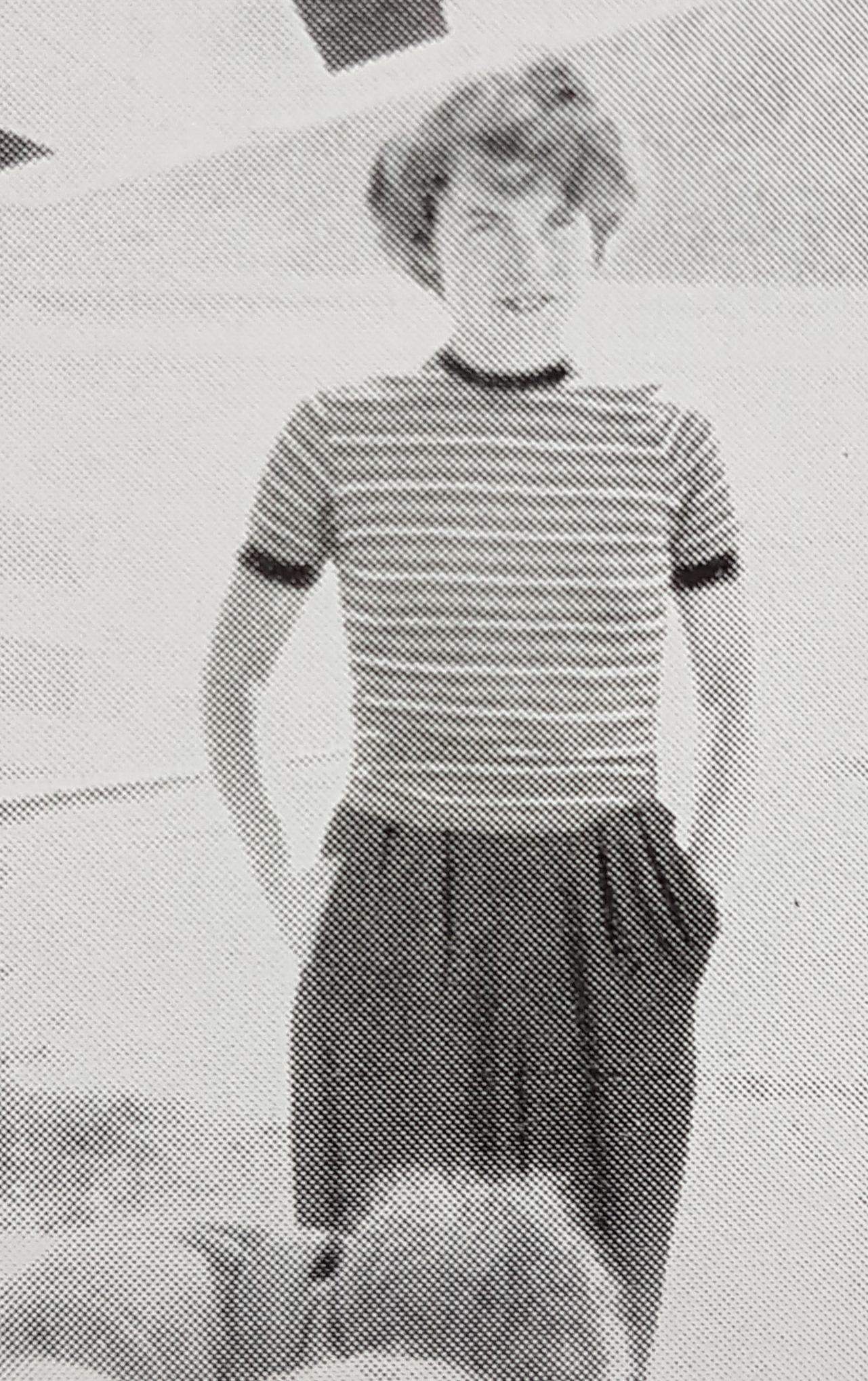
The young Ann Edmonds

Ann Courtney Edmonds was born in London, the daughter of a railway engineer. As a child, she kept a diary listing every aeroplane that flew over their house. She first flew with Alan Cobham in 1930. After she had acquired a motorbike to visit the local aerodrome, she learned to fly, earning her pilot's licence in 1934 one month after her seventeenth birthday. From an early age, she excelled in drawing and painting, and was a painter of note.

== Gliding activity ==
She started gliding in 1937 and attended an Anglo-German Fellowship Camp at the London Gliding Club at which she met distinguished German pilots Wolf Hirth and Hanna Reitsch. This led to Ann making a return visit to Germany in 1938.

Also in 1938 she re-started the Surrey Gliding Club at Redhill, Surrey, becoming their Chief Flying Instructor (CFI) and achieving a membership of over 100.

In 1939, she married Flight Lieutenant (later Wing Commander) Graham Douglas with whom she had two children.

== World War II ==
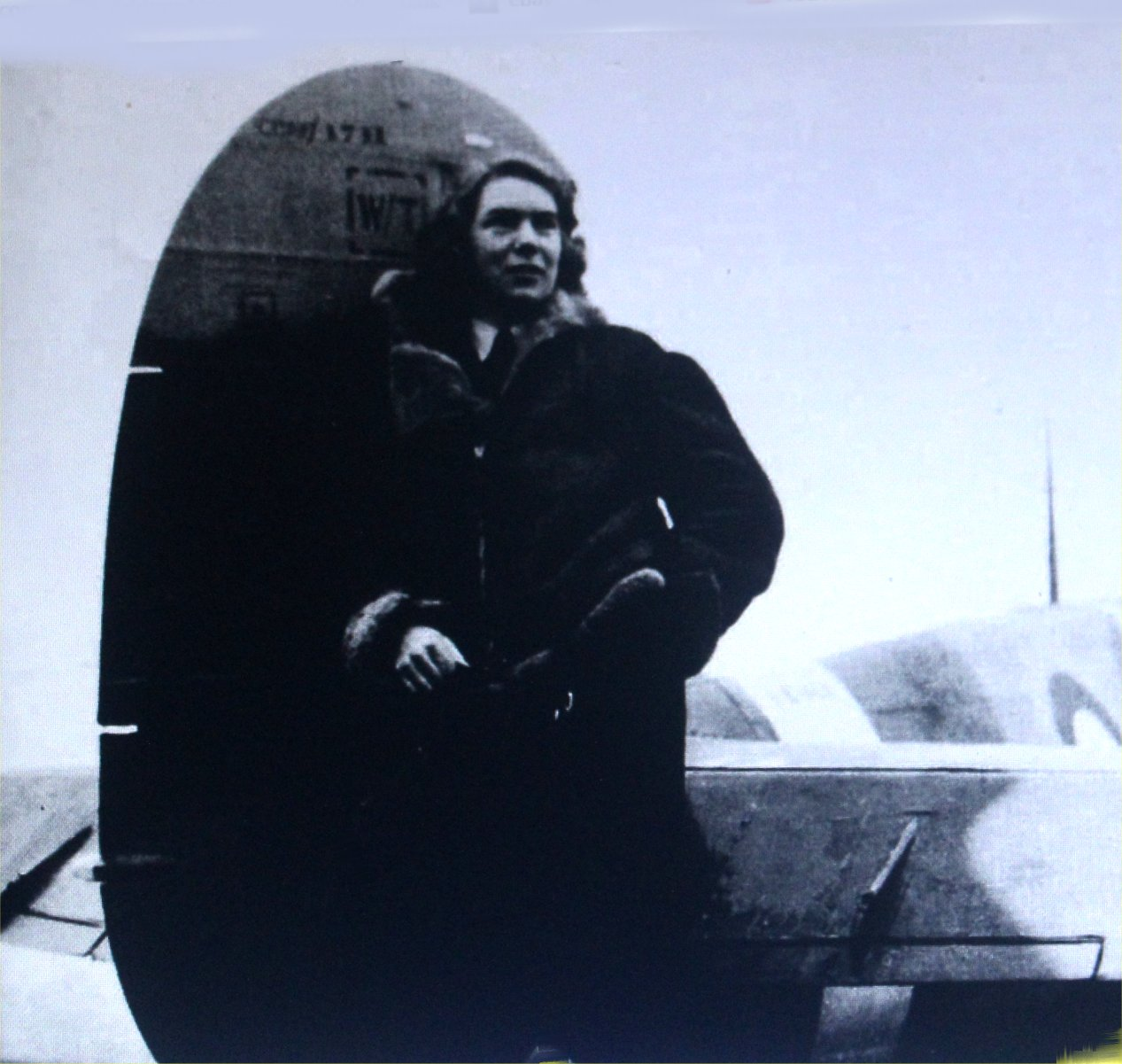
Ann Douglas WW2 Pilot

When the Second World War broke out, Ann enrolled in the Air Transport Auxiliary on 1 December 1940 with about 100 flight hours and passed a flight check. Later she reached the rank of Pilot First Officer. The task of the ATA was to ferry new aircraft from their manufacturer's air base to the RAF front-line airfields so that they be flown operationally by squadron pilots without the distraction of having to pick up new aircraft from their manufacturers.

In the ATA she was able to ferry many types of aircraft including Spitfires, Hurricanes, Blenheims and Wellingtons from the factories to their operational units.

She stopped this work on 19 August 1942 shortly before the birth of her first daughter. In 1943 under the name "A. C. Douglas" she published Cloud Reading for Pilots. The book, quite unique at the time, remains an excellent introduction on the use of cloud observations in assessing the state of the atmosphere.

== Gliding ==
After the war Ann returned to gliding and, with Lorne Welch and Walter Morison (two former prisoners at Colditz Castle), restarted the Surrey Gliding Club at Redhill airfield.

The Surrey Club moved in 1951 to Lasham Airfield and gliding activities at Lasham expanded because other clubs were also based there such as the Army Gliding Club under the management of Colonel Tony Deane-Drummond.

At this time she divorced her first husband and married Lorne Welch.

In her gliding activities she trained many pilots and instructors while bringing up a young family from her first and second husbands.

For twenty years she was in charge of the British Gliding Association's panel of examiners responsible for instructor standards and training.

She was a cross-country glider pilot and flew distance flights in France, Poland and the UK. Flying from Lezno in Poland in 1961, she broke the British women's distance record with a distance flight of 528 km.

She was manager of the British Gliding team at World Gliding Championships for many years.

She wrote many books on aviation subjects.

She flew over 150 types of gliders and powered aircraft.

== Administration ==
Ann was Vice Chair of the British Gliding Association (BGA) for several years. She also managed the administration of the British Gliding Team for some twenty years.

She was also involved in organising competitions including the World Gliding Championships at South Cerney in 1965, for which she was elevated to the position of chairman for the duration of the competition.

Later on, she was UK Delegate to the FAI's International Gliding Commission and acted as jury member at several World Gliding Championships.

For many years, she and Philip Wills administered British gliding until members felt that younger people were required. She was succeeded as the BGA Delegate to IGC by Ian Strachan, the Chair of the BGA Competitions Committee at the time.

She then moved away from gliding and used her background and talents to persuade hang gliding and paragliding people to organise themselves so that they could form new Air Sport areas within the Federation Aeronautique Internationale (FAI). She became founder President of two new Commissions, the FAI Hang Gliding Commission and its Paragliding Commission.

She was also a member of the FAI's Microlight Commission.

She became president of the British Hang Gliding Association and when in 1991, the hang-gliders and paragliders joined forces, Welch was appointed president of the British Hang Gliding and Paragliding Association.

In 1978 she was appointed the president of the British Microlight Aircraft Association, a position she held until her death, working actively for the association including attending as a member of their governing council.

== Awards and honours ==
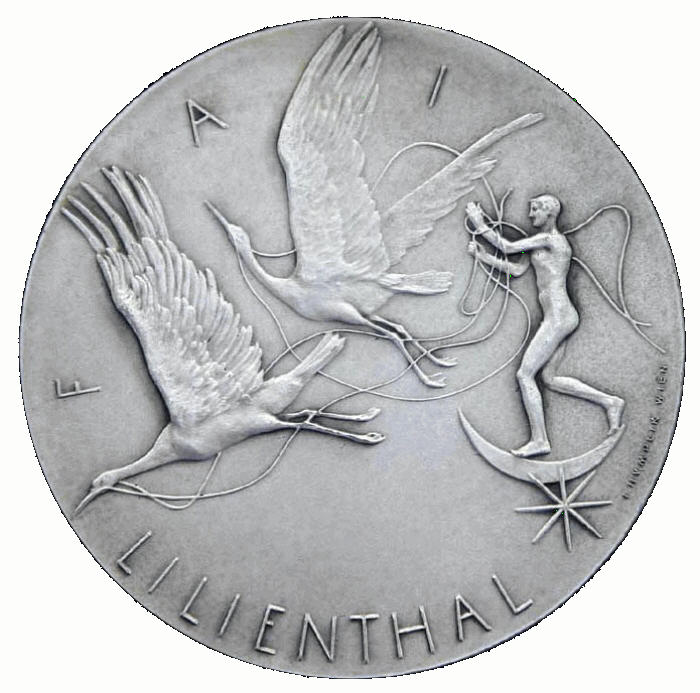
Lilienthal medal

She was awarded the FAI Bronze Medal (1969) and the Lilienthal Gliding Medal (1973) (only the fourth woman to be awarded it following Marcelle Choisnet (1951), Pelagia Majewska (1960) and Anne Burns (1966)).

She received the FAI Gold Air Medal (1980) in recognition of her devotion to the training and encouragement of young pilots. (With the Gold Medal she joined a group that included Yuri Gagarin and Frank Whittle.)

In 1989 she was awarded the FAI's Pelagia Majewska Gliding Medal as an outstanding female glider pilot.

She was appointed MBE in 1953 and advanced to OBE in 1966. In 1996 she was awarded the Gold Medal of the Royal Aero Club.

Her love of outdoor activities included sailing and she studied the wind and tides. This was rewarded when in 1997 she was elected an Honorary Fellow of the Royal Institute of Navigation.

In 2005, the Ann Welch Award was instituted for outstanding contributions to instruction in air sports. It was first presented in 2006 at Royal Aero Club's Awards Ceremony.

Also in 2006, the FAI created the Ann Welch Diploma which may be awarded each year to the pilot or crew of a microlight or paramotor who made the most meritorious flight which resulted in a world record.

Annually, since 2006, usually in late spring, the Royal Aeronautical Society holds its Ann Welch named lecture in London, typically on a General Aviation theme.

== Personal life ==
In 1939 Ann (Edmonds) married Graham Douglas, whose family owned Redhill Aerodrome and who had loaned the club the £300 needed to buy the necessary gliders and a winch.

This marriage was dissolved in 1948 and five years later she married Lorne Welch in 1953. Lorne Welch predeceased her.

She was survived by her three daughters., two from Douglas and one from Lorne Welch.

== Bibliography ==
- Accidents Happen ISBN 0-7195-3545-X John Murray 24 Aug 1978
- New Soaring Pilot (with Frank Irving and for first edition: Lorne Welch) ISBN 0-7195-3302-3 John Murray 25 Aug 1977
- Happy to Fly (autobiography) ISBN 0-7195-4033-X John Murray 22 September 1983
- The Story of Gliding ISBN 0-7195-3659-6 John Murray 22 May 1980
- Pilot's Weather ISBN 0-7195-2661-2 John Murray 29 Oct 1973
- Hang Glider Pilot (with Gerry Breen) ISBN 0-7195-3377-5 John Murray Dec 1977
- Gliding (Know the Game) ISBN 0-7136-3818-4 A & C Black 27 October 1994
- Hang Gliding (Know the Game) ISBN 0-7136-5501-1 A & C Black 16 Jan 1986
- The Book of Airsports ISBN 0-7134-1148-1 Batsford 27 Jun 1978
- The Complete Soaring Guide (Flying & Gliding) ISBN 0-7136-5540-2 A & C Black 24 April 1986
- Complete Microlight Guide ISBN 0-7158-0835-4 EP 23 Sep 1983
- Soaring Hang Gliders ISBN 0-7195-3812-2 John Murray 21 May 1981
- Cloud Reading for Pilots (as "A. C. Douglas") John Murray 1943

and several others
