= Kepka (surname) =

Kepka is a surname. As a Polish surname, it is typically spelled Kępka or, less commonly, Kempka. The Czech surname Kepka has a feminine form, Kepková.

Notable people with the surname include:

- Franciszek Kępka (1940–2001), Polish glider pilot
- J. P. Kepka (born 1984), American short track speed skater
- Ondřej Kepka (born 1969), Czech actor and film director

== See also ==
- Koepka
