= Karl Rabeder =

Austrian businessman (born 1963)

Karl Rabeder (born 1963) is an Austrian businessman who founded the non-profit organization MyMicroCredit in 2009, which aims to reduce poverty in Central and South America. In February 2010, announced that he will be donating his entire fortune of over four million US dollars, including the profits from all of his properties, his car, and his businesses, to charities he set up in Central and South America.

Serious allegations have been raised by the German newspaper, Der Stern, and others as to whether or not Rabeder was actually using the publicity around his "giving it all away" to generate revenue for his own personal purposes.

On 21 January 2003 he was the co-pilot with Klaus Ohlmann when they set the world gliding distance record of 3,008.8 km at Chapelco, Argentina
