= Lilienthal Gliding Medal =

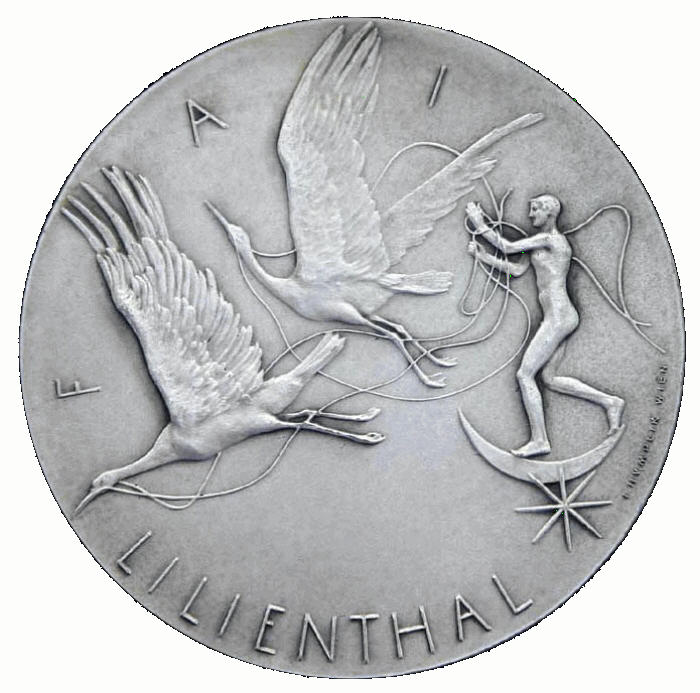
- Obverse of the Lilienthal Medal
- Awarded for: Remarkable performance in gliding, or eminent services to the sport of gliding over a long period of time
- Country: Worldwide
- Presented by: Fédération Aéronautique Internationale (FAI)
- First award: 1938
- Final award: current
- Website: FAI official site

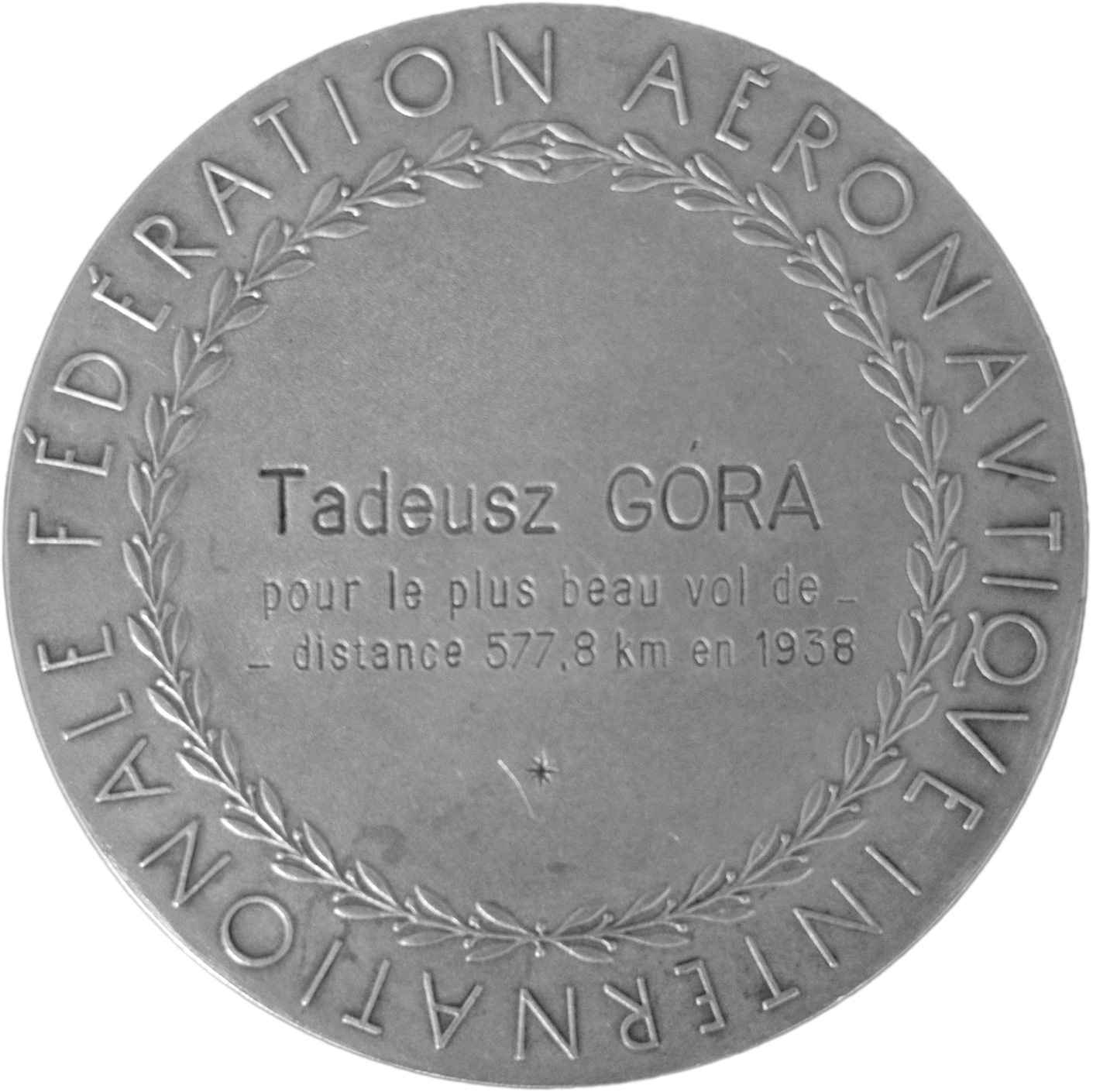
Reverse of the Lilienthal Medal awarded to Tadeusz Góra

Lilienthal Gliding Medal – the highest soaring award in the world, established by Fédération Aéronautique Internationale (FAI) in 1938, and is given at the annual Fédération Aéronautique Internationale (FAI) General Conference.

It was created in honour of Otto Lilienthal, a German pioneer of human aviation. It aims "to reward a particularly remarkable performance in gliding, or eminent services to the sport of gliding over a long period of time." The actual Lilienthal Medal was designed by Austrian artist Josef Humplik.

The first winner of the Lilienthal Gliding Medal in the world was Tadeusz Góra for his record-breaking 577.8 kilometres (359.0 miles; 312.0 nautical miles) flight on 18 May 1938, glider PWS-101 from Bezmiechowa to Soleczniki (near Vilnius).

The Medal is awarded by the Fédération Aéronautique Internationale via vote of the delegates to the International Gliding Commission at the annual Plenary in March. In 2012, it was decided to end the practice of awarding the Medal for accomplishments of the previous calendar year, and to associate the Medal with the year in which the recipient is determined. Consequently, the year 2013 was not awarded, therefore does not appear in the table below.

== Recipients ==
Recipients of the International Gliding Commission award, from 1938 to present, include:

award year	recipient	nationality	notes
1938	Tadeusz Góra	Poland	for a goal flight of 577.8 kilometres (359.0 miles; 312.0 nautical miles)
1948	Lt. Per-Axel Persson	Sweden	
1949	John C. Robinson	United States	
1950	William S. Ivans	United States	
1951	Marcelle Choisnet-Gohard	France	
1952	Charles Atger	France	
1953	Victor M. Iltchenko	(Soviet Union) USSR	flight of 520 miles (450 nautical miles; 840 kilometres), a world two-seater record, from Moscow to Stalingrad
1954	Philip A. Wills	United Kingdom	
1955	Dr. Joachim Küttner	Germany	
1956	Dr. Paul B. MacCready Jr.	United States	
1957	Don Luis Vicente Juez Gomez	Spain	
1958	Wolf Hirth	Germany	
1959	Richard E. Schreder	United States	
1960	Pelagia Majewska	Poland	
1961	Adolph 'Pirat' Gehriger	Switzerland	
1962	Paul F. Bikle	United States	
1963	Heinz Huth	Germany	
1964	Alvin H. Parker	United States	
1965	Edward Makula	Poland	
1966	Anne Burns	United Kingdom	
1967	Lennart Stahlfors	Sweden	
1968	Alejo Williamson	Chile	
1969	Eric Nessler	France	
1970	Hans-Werner Grosse	Germany	
1971	Karl H. Striedieck	United States	
1972	Jan Wróblewski	Poland	twice World Champion, 1965 Open and 1972 Standard Class
1973	Mrs. Ann Welch	United Kingdom	
1974	August Hug	Switzerland	
1975	Adela Dankowska	Poland	for her world records & winning the 1975 International Women's Gliding Competition
1976	Louis A. de Lange	Netherlands	
1977	George B. Moffat, Jr.	United States	
1978	Helmut Reichmann	Germany	
1980	Hans Wolf	Austria	
1981	George Lee	United Kingdom	World gliding champion on three consecutive occasions
1982	Hans Nietlispach	Switzerland	
1984	C.E. Wallington	Australia	
1985	Sholto Hamilton 'Dick' Georgeson	New Zealand	
1986	Maj. Richard L. Johnson	United States	
1987	Juhani Horma	Finland	
1988	Ingo Renner	Australia	
1990	Fred Weinholtz	Germany	
1991	Raymond W. Lynskey	New Zealand	
1992	Franciszek Kępka	Poland	
1993	Bernald S. Smith	United States	
1994	Terrence Raymond Delore	New Zealand	
1995	Tor Johannessen	Norway	
1997	Dr. Manfred Reinhardt	Germany	
1998	Oran Nicks	United States	
1999	Hana Zejdová	Czech Republic	
2000	Klaus Ohlmann	Germany	
2001	James M. Payne	United States	
2002	John Hamish Roake	New Zealand	
2003	Prof. Ing. Piero Morelli	Italy	
2004	Janusz Centka	Poland	
2005	Ian Strachan	United Kingdom	
2006	Alan Patching	Australia	
2007	Derek Piggott	United Kingdom	
2008	Roland Stuck	France	
2009	Ross Macintyre	New Zealand	
2010	Reiner Rose	Germany	
2011	Giorgio Galetto	Italy	
2012	Bob Henderson	New Zealand	
2014	not awarded	—	
2015	Loek Boermans	Netherlands	
2016	Rainer Wienzek	Germany	
2017	Patrick Pauwels	Belgium	
2018	not awarded	—	
2019	Richard 'Dick' Bradley	South Africa	
2020	Gisela Weinreich	Germany	
2021	Eric Mozer	United States	
2022	not awarded	—	
2023	Jana Vepřeková	Czech Republic	in the history of women's world sailing, she has the largest number of participations at the WC and EC, she won a medal at every 2nd; 10 medals from top world and European competitions (1× gold, 3× silver and 6× bronze)
2024	Tadeáš Wala	Slovakia	
2025	not awarded	—	

== See also ==
- List of aviation awards
