= Koepka =

Koepka is a surname. Notable people with the surname include:

- Brooks Koepka (born 1990), American golfer
- Chase Koepka (born 1994), American golfer

== See also ==
- Kepka (surname)
