= George Lee (pilot) =

George Lee MBE
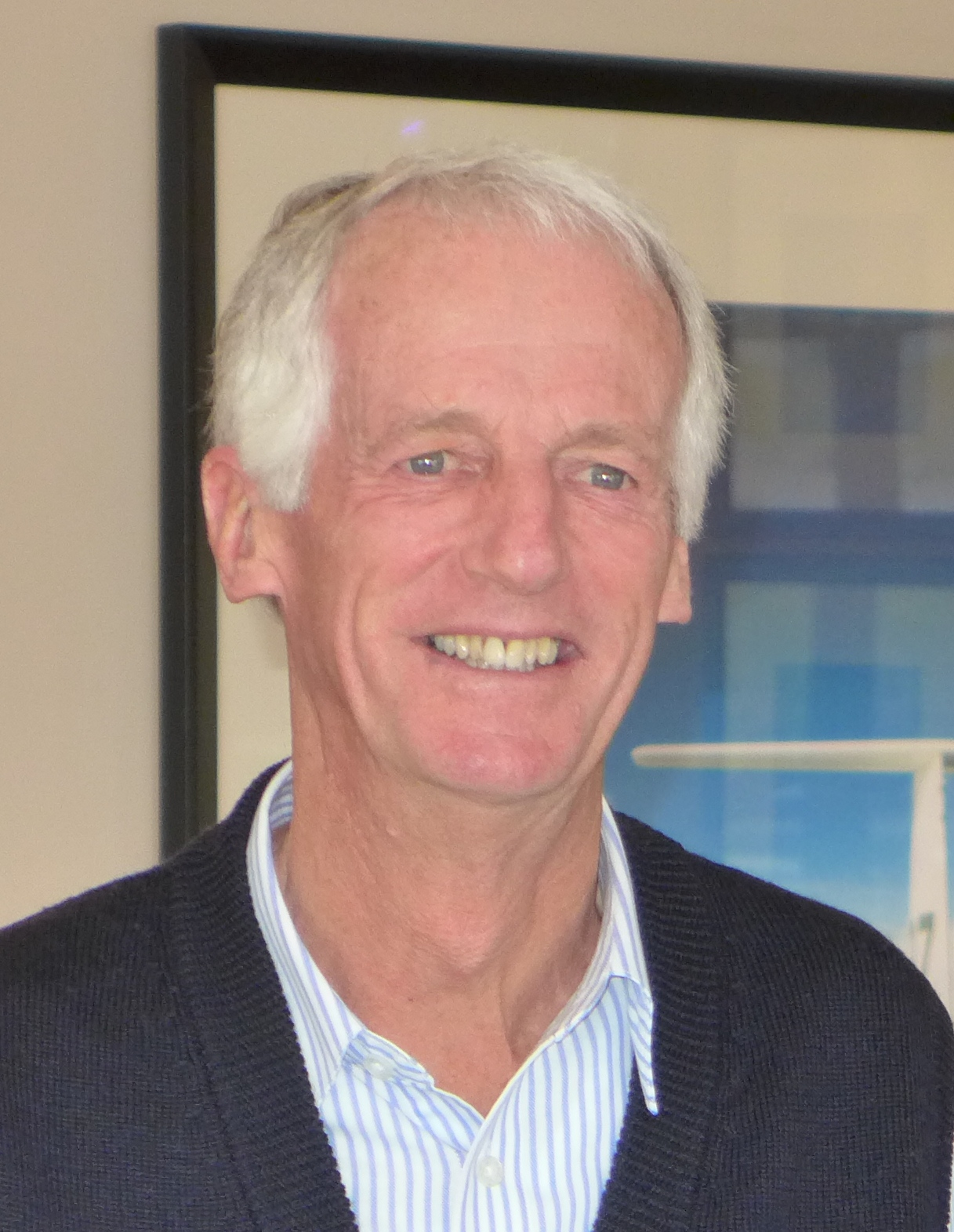
- Born: Douglas George Lee; 7 November 1945 (age 80); Dublin, Ireland
- Education: Royal Air Force engineering apprenticeship in aircraft electrical systems
- Known for: Multiple Open-class Gliding World Championship winner
- Spouse: Maren Lee
- Relatives: Sonja Lee and Brian Lee – children
- Awards: MBE (Member of the Order of the British Empire); Royal Aero Club's Gold Medal; Britannia Trophy; Lilienthal Gliding Medal
- Aviation career
- Air force: Royal Air Force
- Rank: Squadron leader

Racing career
- First race: 1974 British National Gliding Championship
- Best position: Three times world champion: 1976, 1978 & 1981
- Aircraft: Schempp-Hirth Nimbus-3
- Website: holdfasttodreams.com

Douglas George Lee MBE (born 7 November 1945) is a glider pilot who was world gliding champion on three consecutive occasions.

He was born in Dublin, Ireland. He joined the Royal Air Force as an engineering apprentice at the age of sixteen in 1962, becoming a British subject. He completed his training as an electrical fitter and in 1967 he was selected for officer and pilot training. He joined an operational squadron in 1971 flying Phantoms. He left the RAF in 1983 as a squadron leader and joined Cathay Pacific to fly Boeing 747s.

During his apprenticeship he began gliding with the Royal Air Force Gliding & Soaring Association, winning his first British National Championship in 1974 in an ASW17. He was selected for the British Team for the World Gliding Championships at Räyskälä in Finland in 1976 and won the Open Class in an ASW17. He then won the following two World Championships at Châteauroux in France 1978 (also in an ASW17) and at Paderborn in Germany 1981 in a Nimbus-3, becoming the first person to win three successive World Championship titles. He flew in two more World Championships but his home in Hong Kong had reduced his opportunities for gliding and so he was out of practice.

He received several awards including the MBE, the Royal Aero Club's gold medal in 1976, the Britannia Trophy (twice) and the Lilienthal Gliding Medal. In 1978 he took Prince Charles for his first flight in a glider.

He bought a farm near Dalby in Queensland in 1996 in anticipation of his retirement in 1999. He established a small airfield there and is now an Australian citizen. With his Schempp-Hirth Nimbus-4DM, he taught advanced pilots for ten years. He and his wife, Maren, are now active in their church and in politics in Queensland. They have two children, Sonja and Brian. He published his autobiography, Hold Fast To Your Dreams, in 2013, which was also published in Polish in 2015 as Uwierz w marzenia.

== See also ==
List of glider pilots
