= Hans-Werner Grosse =

German pilot (1922–2021)

- Born: 28 November 1922; Swinemünde, Pomerania, Prussia, Germany
- Died: 18 February 2021 (aged 98); Lübeck, Schleswig-Holstein, Germany
- Military career
- Branch: Luftwaffe
- Service years: 1943–1945

Hans-Werner Grosse (28 November 1922 – 18 February 2021) was a German Luftwaffe bomber pilot and glider pilot who established 50 world records approved by FAI Gliding Commission.

== Early life ==
Grosse was born in Swinemünde, now Świnoujście in Poland, in 1922. In 1936 he learned to fly on a Hitler Youth school glider. He crashed once during his training and was seriously injured. At the age of 21 he became a power pilot and flew Junkers Ju 88 bombers in the Mediterranean theatre. He was shot down in a Ju 88 torpedo-bomber over the Mediterranean on 6 June 1944. He ditched at night with a burning engine 35 km south of Toulon. After some time in hospital in Paris, he was sent to Norway to fly Ju 88s against the Arctic Convoys.

After the war he settled in Lübeck. From 1950 he set up a regional specialist shop for jeans, other trousers and outerwear at Königstrasse 85, which he named Manchester Große after the fabric used for corduroy trousers.

== Gliding career ==
Grosse's free distance world record of 1,460.80 km (907.70 mi) from his home city of Lübeck (West Germany) to Biarritz (France) was set on 25 April 1972 in a Schleicher ASW 12. After starting in Lübeck, and eleven and a half hours in flight, he landed in Biarritz in southwestern France. He held this record for more than 30 years. It was not broken until 9 January 2003 (by Klaus Ohlmann in Argentina). Grosse has offered a €750 prize for youth pilots who manage to exceed his flight within Europe. In an interview, Grosse said he could have flown farther, but he didn't want to risk flying into Spain at dusk without the appropriate licence.

This record was far from his only success. He has held a total of 50 gliding world records. Among his other world records were: the largest triangular distance (1,306 km (812 mi) in 1981), the fastest speed round a 1,250 km (780 mi) triangle (133 km/h (83 mph) in 1980) and the fastest speed round a 300 km (190 mi) triangle (158 km/h (98 mph) also in 1980). These record flights started from Alice Springs, Australia. He came second in the World Gliding Championships in 1970. He was awarded the Lilienthal Gliding Medal in 1970.

For his 75th birthday, Grosse was named an honorary member of the German National Gliding Team of the FAI League due to his outstanding performance in the sport of gliding. He was presented this certificate, which is unique up to this time, by the President of the International Gliding Commission (IGC) and Director of the World Gliding Championships 1999 in Bayreuth, Professor Peter Ryder, at the birthday celebration on 29 November 1997. Grosse was also an honorary member of the Deutscher AeroClub e.V. and the chief initiator of the Eta project. He himself owned the first model of this glider, which is still the largest glider in the world (30.90 m wingspan) and features a performance rivaled by just a handful of other gliders today.

His commitment to gliding is also shown by the establishment of the project, "Jugendfördernde Maßnahmen Ost" (Measures to Support Youth East). In this project, Grosse made his high-performance Schleicher ASH 25 glider available to young glider pilots in organisations in eastern Germany for the purpose of making it possible for the new generation of glider pilots to fly with modern equipment which would not usually be available to them.

Grosse died on 18 February 2021 at the age of 98.
