= Paul Bikle =

American aviator

Paul F. Bikle
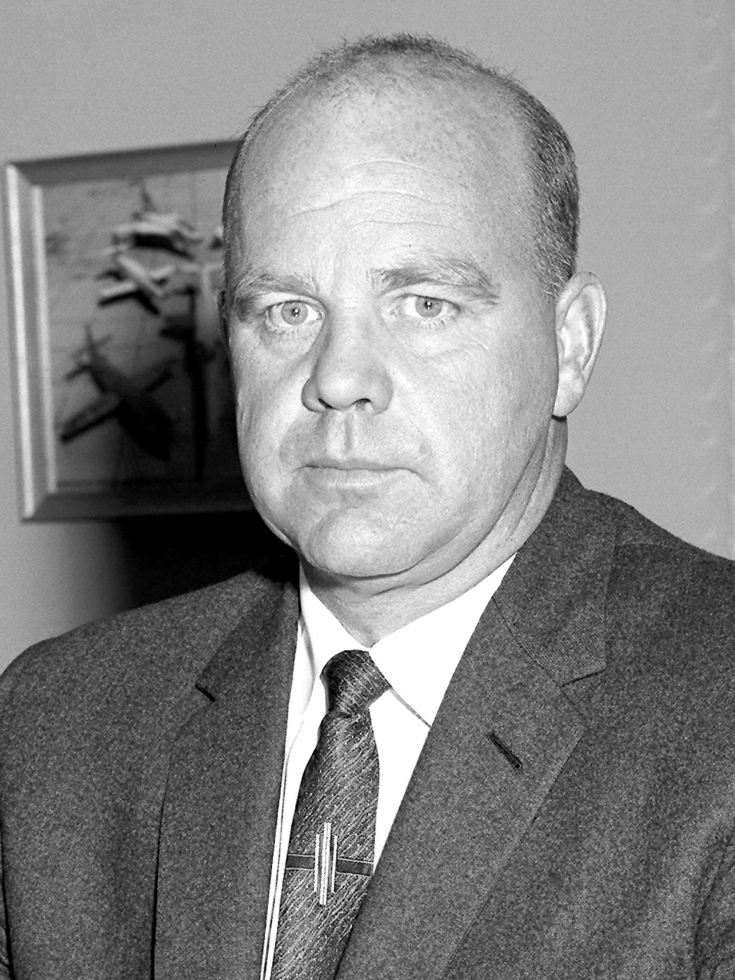
- Director Paul F. Bikle, at NASA's Flight Research Center (FRC) in 1959 (from NASA Photo E-4875)
- Born: June 5, 1916; Wilkinsburg, Pennsylvania, U.S.
- Died: January 19, 1991 (aged 74); Salinas, California, U.S.
- Education: University of Detroit, B.S. 1939
- Known for: Inspiring the Rogallo wing used in many modern hang-gliders
- Aviation career
- Famous flights: He established two world soaring records on 25 February 1961 while flying his Schweizer SGS 1-23E near Lancaster, California, achieving an altitude of 46,267 ft (14,102 m) feet and a total-altitude-gained mark of 42,300 ft (12,900 m).

Paul F. Bikle (June 5, 1916 – January 19, 1991) was director of the U.S. National Aeronautics and Space Administration (NASA) Dryden Flight Research Facility from 1959 until 1971, and author of more than 40 technical publications. He was associated with major aeronautical research programs including the hypersonic X-15 rocket plane, and was a world record-setting glider pilot.

== Civilian career ==
Before graduating from the University of Detroit in 1939 with a Bachelor of Science degree in aeronautical engineering, Bikle's activity in the student chapter of the Institute of the Aeronautical Sciences (IAS), and the school gliding and flying clubs, led to flight instruction and a pilot's license from the C.A.A., the predecessor to the FAA. He later became a fellow in the American Institute of Aeronautics and Astronautics, the successor to the IAS. Mr. Bikle worked for Taylorcraft Aircraft in Ohio before beginning his government service career.

== Air Force career ==
His career with the U.S. Air Force began in 1940 when he was appointed an aeronautical engineer at Wright Field. In 1944 he was named Chief of the Aerodynamics Branch in the Flight Test Division there. While working closely with other government agencies in establishing the first flying qualities specifications for aircraft, he also wrote AAF Technical Report 50693 Flight Test Methods, which was used as a standard manual for conducting flight tests for more than five years. During the World War II years he was involved in more than 30 test projects and flew over 1,200 hours as an engineering observer.

In 1947 Bikle was appointed Chief of the Performance Engineering Branch, and directed tests of the XB-43 Jetmaster, the first U.S. jet bomber; the Convair XC-99, and the North American F-86A Sabre. With the transfer of this part of the flight test mission to the newly formed Air Force Flight Test Center at Edwards AFB, he advanced to Assistant Chief of the Flight Test Engineering Laboratory in 1951.

== NASA career ==
Paul Bikle was technical director of the Air Force Flight Test Center at Edwards Air Force Base in September 1959, when he was named Director of the NASA Flight Research Center (FRC) at Edwards, California. In July 1962 he was awarded the NASA Medal for Outstanding Leadership for his part in directing flight operations and research activities on the highly successful rocket-powered X-15 program. After Paul's retirement on 31 May 1971, The FRC became the Dryden Flight Research Center in 1976.

During his nearly 12 years with NASA he was responsible for several major aeronautical research programs, including those involving the X-15, the supersonic XB-70, the fleet of wingless lifting bodies that contributed to development of the Space Shuttles, and the Lunar Landing Research Vehicle that paved the way for successful Moon landings by Project Apollo astronauts.

Just before Christmas 1961 Paul Bikle gave a directive to Charles Richard to quickly and cheaply design and build what would become the template for the Rogallo wing used for a high percentage of modern hang gliders. Following successful test flying of the Paresev (paraglider research vehicle), many prospective hang glider pilots made their own hang gliders with various fuselage solutions; including the use of the triangle control bar, parallel-bar, full-cockpit, tri-cycle undercarriage and powered hang-gliders. Paul Bikle's directive synergistically birthed a wing that would dramatically change personal aviation in powered and un-powered forms.

== Soaring ==
Bikle was a veteran of 23 years of soaring, and was president of the Soaring Society of America (SSA). He established two world soaring records on 25 February 1961 while flying his Schweizer SGS 1-23E near Lancaster, California, achieving an altitude of 46,267 ft (14,102 m) feet and a total-altitude-gained mark of 42,300 ft (12,900 m). Both marks were certified by the National Aeronautic Association, and the Fédération Aéronautique Internationale. Bikle still holds the record for height gain. He flew a Prue Standard to a world record distance of 557 mi (896 km) in 1963, the longest ever made by a sailplane up to that date. He became a member of the Soaring Hall of Fame in 1960 and was awarded the FAI Lilienthal Gliding Medal, the highest award in international soaring, in 1962.

While director of the Dryden Flight Research Facility, Bikle designed and completed his own sailplane, the Bikle T-6, flying it to fifth place in the 1970 US Nationals.

=== Other soaring accomplishments ===
- Barringer Trophy (1952, 1953, 1954, 1955, 1956)
- U.S. Diamond badge #3 (International #7) (1953)
- Symons Three Lennie award #11
- Eaton Trophy (1964)
- Paul Tissandier Diploma (1968)
- Tuntland Award (1970, 1971)
- OSTIV Plaque/Klemperer Award (1972)
- World/National Competition
- Smirnoff Derby
- Sailplane Performance Studies/Tests
