= Sabrina Jackintell =

American glider pilot (1940–2012)

- Born: January 31, 1940; Youngstown, Ohio
- Died: January 15, 2012 (aged 71); Sebring, Florida
- Education: Wilson High School, Youngstown
- Alma mater: University of Florida, Gainesville
- Occupation: Glider pilot
- Known for: Current holder of Women's World Record Gliding Altitude
- Spouse: Jerry E. Jackintell
- Children: two

Sabrina Patricia Jackintell (31 January 1940 – 15 January 2012) was an American glider pilot. She still holds the women's record for highest altitude in a glider. She also attempted to break the Women's Land Speed Record.

== Personal life ==
Sabrina Jackintell (née Sadie Patricia Paluga) was born at Youngstown, Ohio. the second child of John and Sadie Skvarka Paluga. Her father was a steel worker who had emigrated from Czechoslovakia. She attended Wilson High School in Youngstown. She was a talented painter. One of her paintings was exhibited at the Carnegie Museum, Pittsburgh, Ohio, in 1956. She graduated from the University of Florida, Gainesville, in 1960. While in college she began modelling and was featured on the cover of the fashion magazine, Vogue.

She lived in Ohio, Florida, Colorado (where she did most of her glider flying) and Southern California. She was married to Jerry E. Jackintell, also from Youngstown, and a fellow student at the University of Florida. They had a son, Jerry, and daughter, Lori. They divorced in El Paso County, Colorado, 9 June 1982.

In later life Sabrina also enjoyed collecting antiques, spending time with her dogs, and quilting.

Sabrina Jackintell died at Sebring, Florida, 15 January 2012 at the age of 71 from causes including complications from osteoporosis.

== Land Speed Record attempt ==
In 1965 at the age of 25 she drove Art Arfons’s jet-powered Green Monster land speed record car at the Bonneville Salt Flats, at over 500 km/h (310 mph). Mechanical problems prevented the car from making a second pass in the opposite direction within the required time limit, so an official Fédération Internationale de l’Automobile (FIA) Land Speed Record was not set. A few days later her friend Betty Skelton drove the Cyclops, another of Art Arfon’s jet cars, both ways through the timing traps, giving Betty the official women’s land speed record at 446.63 km/h (277.52 mph).

== Gliding ==
She was an experience cross-country and aerobatic pilot, logging over 6400 kilometers of distance. She set many records in the Feminine Category for distance, speed and altitude flights.

She set the absolute world altitude record for glider flight by a woman on 14 February 1979, in a flight lasting three hours and eighteen minutes. She flew her Grob G102 Astir from the Black Forest Gliderport, north of Colorado Springs, Colorado, reaching an altitude of 12,637 m (41,460ft) over Pikes Peak, setting a Fédération Aéronautique Internationale (FAI) World Record. This record still stands.

Jim Foreman reported: “When she landed, she said she had difficulty lowering the [landing] gear and operating the dive brakes on her Astir CS glider. Then she found she had difficulty walking and seemed confused, a quick check gave strong indications of a stroke, so I took her to the emergency room. After about ten hours of tests, they said they could find nothing wrong with her except low oxygen levels. The ship still had oxygen pressure and the regulator was checked and found to be operating properly. She was fully recovered in about 24 hours.”
