= Pelagia Majewska =

Polish glider pilot/instructor (1933–1988)

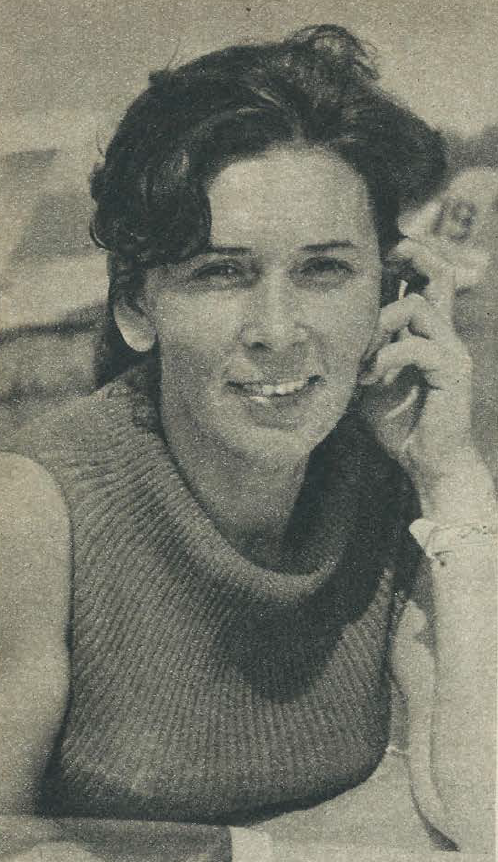
- Born: Pelagia Teresa Pietrzak; April 26, 1933; Rowne (now Rivne, Poland)
- Died: July 12, 1988 (aged 55); Lisbon
- Occupations: Glider pilot, record breaker

Pelagia Teresa Majewska (26 April 1933 – 12 July 1988) was a Polish aeroplane and glider pilot-instructor, who won many national and world glider records. She was also a social activist.

== Early life and education ==
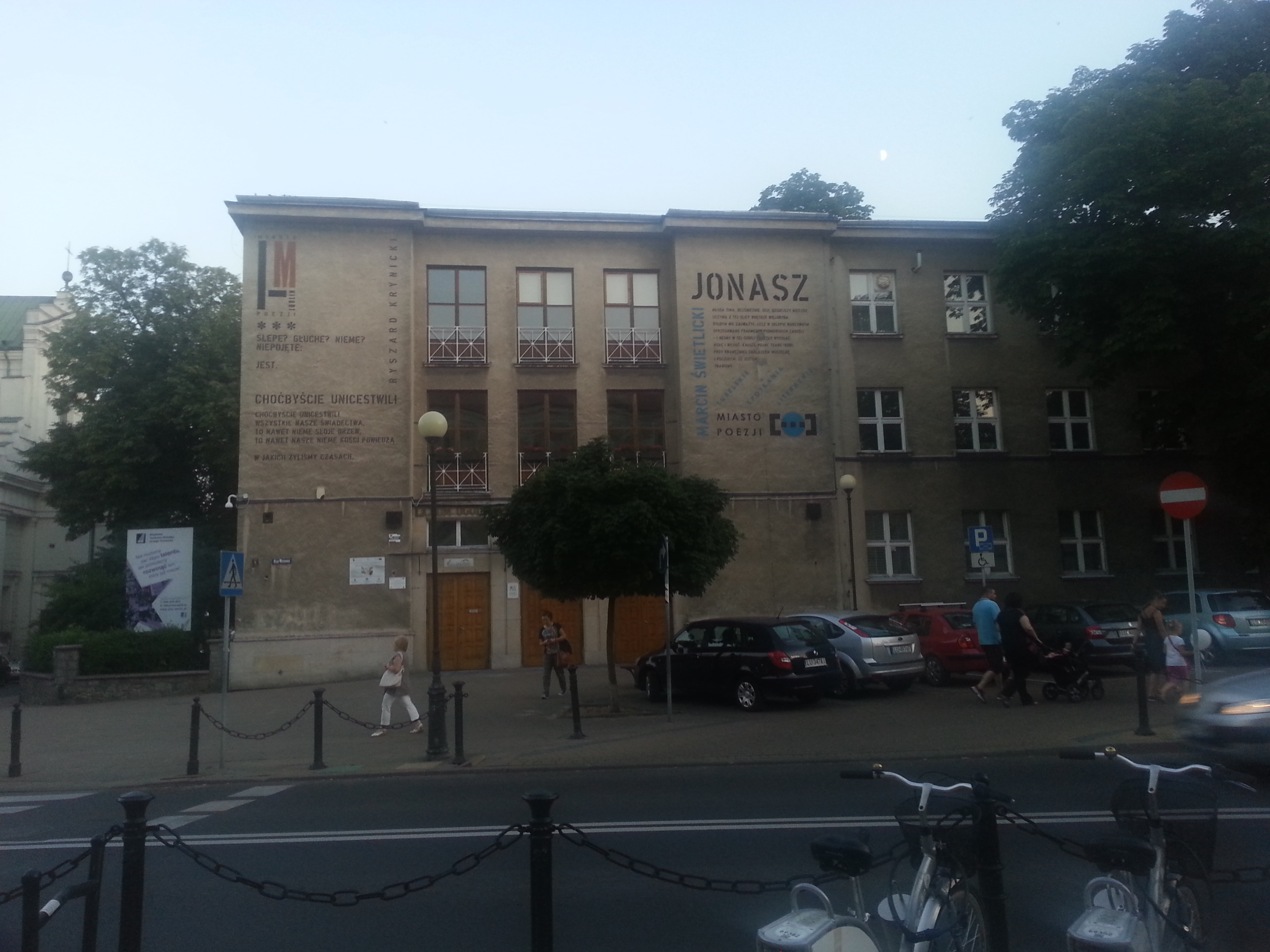
III Liceum Ogólnokształcące im. Unii Lubelskiej w Lublinie

Pelagia Teresa Pietrzak was born on 26 April 1933 in Rowne (now Rivne) in Volhynia to Stanisława (d. 1985) and Jan Pietrzak (d. 1942 in Mauthausen concentration camp). After the Second World War, the surviving family settled in Lublin following the incorporation of Volhynia into the Ukrainian Soviet Socialist Republic. After completing primary school, she attended the III Liceum im. Unii Lubelskie (Unia Lubelska Secondary School).

She earned her secondary school-leaving certificate in 1950.

At school, she belonged to the Polish Scouting and Guiding Association, taking part in athletics and swimming.

== Flying ==
After her high school graduation, she took up parachuting and gliding at the Lublin Aero Club. She then received training in aeroplanes at the club. In 1953, she left Lublin and moved to Warsaw with Tadeusz Majewski, her future husband. In Lublin, she built up her flying hours, flying 40 hours in planes and 18 hours in gliders.

She joined the Warsaw Aero Club and competed in numerous national and international gliding competitions through the organisation. In both 1973 and 1977 she won the Women's International Gliding Competition, and came second in 1975.

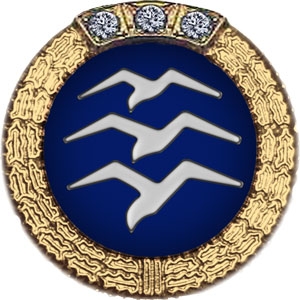
FAI Gliding Commission Diamond Badge.

She was the second woman in Poland and the third woman in the world to win FAI Gliding Commission Diamond Badge, awarded to pilots who fly 300 km (190 mi) to a pre-defined goal, go 500 km (310 mi) in one flight (but not necessarily to a pre-defined goal), and gain 5,000 metres (16,000 ft) in height. Earning all three "diamonds" qualifies the pilot for the FAI registry as a Diamond Badge holder.

She earned 17 world records and 21 national records. Her total gliding flying hours were 3,500 hours and the distance covered was close to 100,000 km (62,000 mi). She was the first glider pilot in the country to be awarded the highest Polish gliding decoration, the Tański Medal (pl), in 1956.

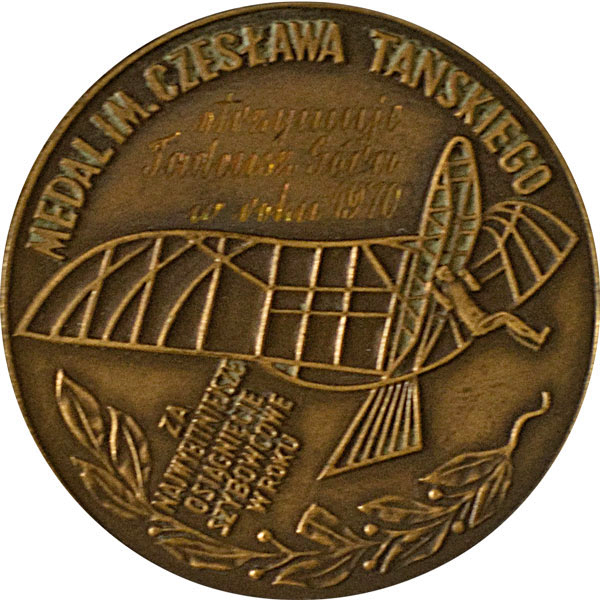
The Tanski medal

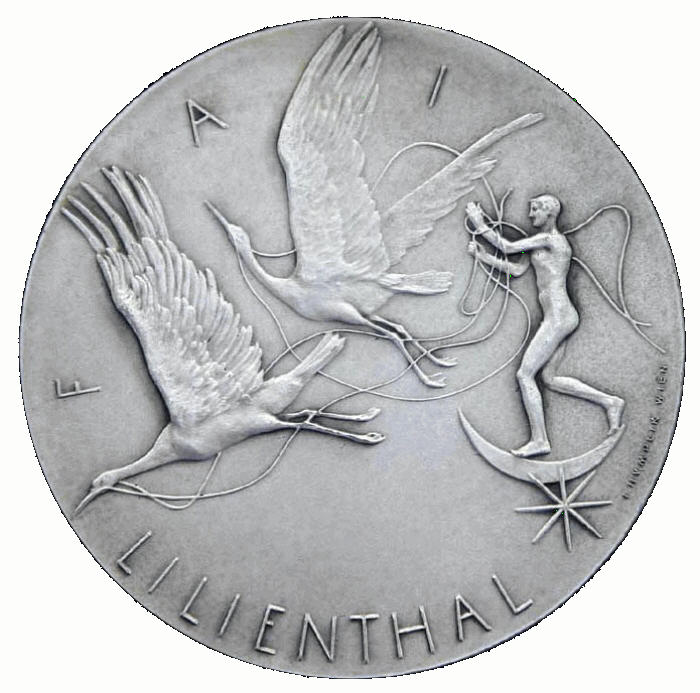
Lilienthal medal obverse

In 1960 Majewska was the first woman in Poland and the second in the world to be awarded the world's highest gliding honour, the Lilienthal Gliding Medal by the Fédération Aéronautique Internationale (FAI). (Marcelle Choisnet was the first woman to receive the award, in 1951). She was a Polish Distinguished Master of Sport and was awarded the Medal for Outstanding Sports Achievements three times.

For a time she worked for some time as a flight training inspector in the Polish Aero Club. She flew many hours in local aeroclubs as a social instructor training young people. She worked with the aeronautics magazine Skrzydlata Polska, published since 1930. She was a member of the editorial board of the weekly, wrote articles, was a sympathetic critic and advisor to the magazine's editorial board and was twice the recipient of the publication's "Blue Wings" award.

In the 1980s, she worked as a pilot at the Agro-Aircraft Services Unit of WSK-PZL Warszawa-Okęcie. She was one of the most experienced pilots in that company. Her last flight was the transport - under an international contract - of a fire-fighting PZL M18 Dromader aircraft to Setubal, Portugal.

== Death ==
On 12 July 1988, Pelagia Majewska died at Lisbon Airport when the powered aircraft she was flying crashed and impacted terrain, after losing engine power on takeoff. She was buried on 21 July 1988 in the family grave in the Roman Catholic cemetery on Lipowa Street in Lublin (plot no. 30A, row XXI, no. 27). She was survived by her husband Tadeusz Zbigniew Majewski (1929–2002) and their son, Sławomir.

Polonia Restituta Oficerski BAR

== Awards and commemoration ==
For her achievements in Polish aviation, Majewska was awarded both the Gold and Silver Cross of Merit and the Silver and Bronze Medal of Merit for National Defence. She was posthumously awarded the Officer's Cross of the Order of Polonia Restituta.

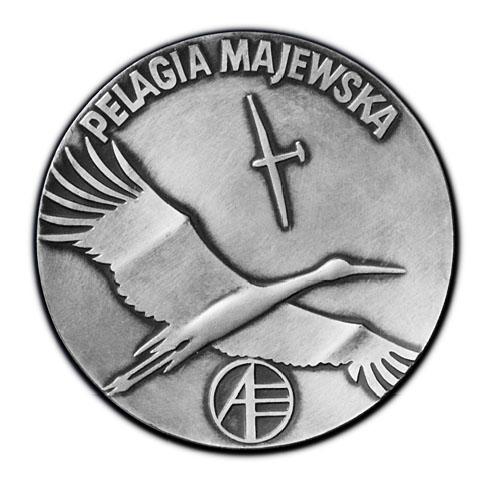
Obverse of the Pelagia Majewska medal

In 1989, at the request of the Polish Aero Club, the Fédération Aéronautique Internationale's General Conference established the Pelagia Majewska medal in honour of her memory. It is an annual award given to a female glider pilot to reward: a particularly remarkable performance in gliding during the past year, or eminent services to gliding over a long period of time.

On 8 January 2002, the Board of the Central Gliding School in Leszno voted to name the AP Central Gliding School after Pelagia Majewska. In 2014, roundabouts were named in her honour in Lublin and Mełgwia.

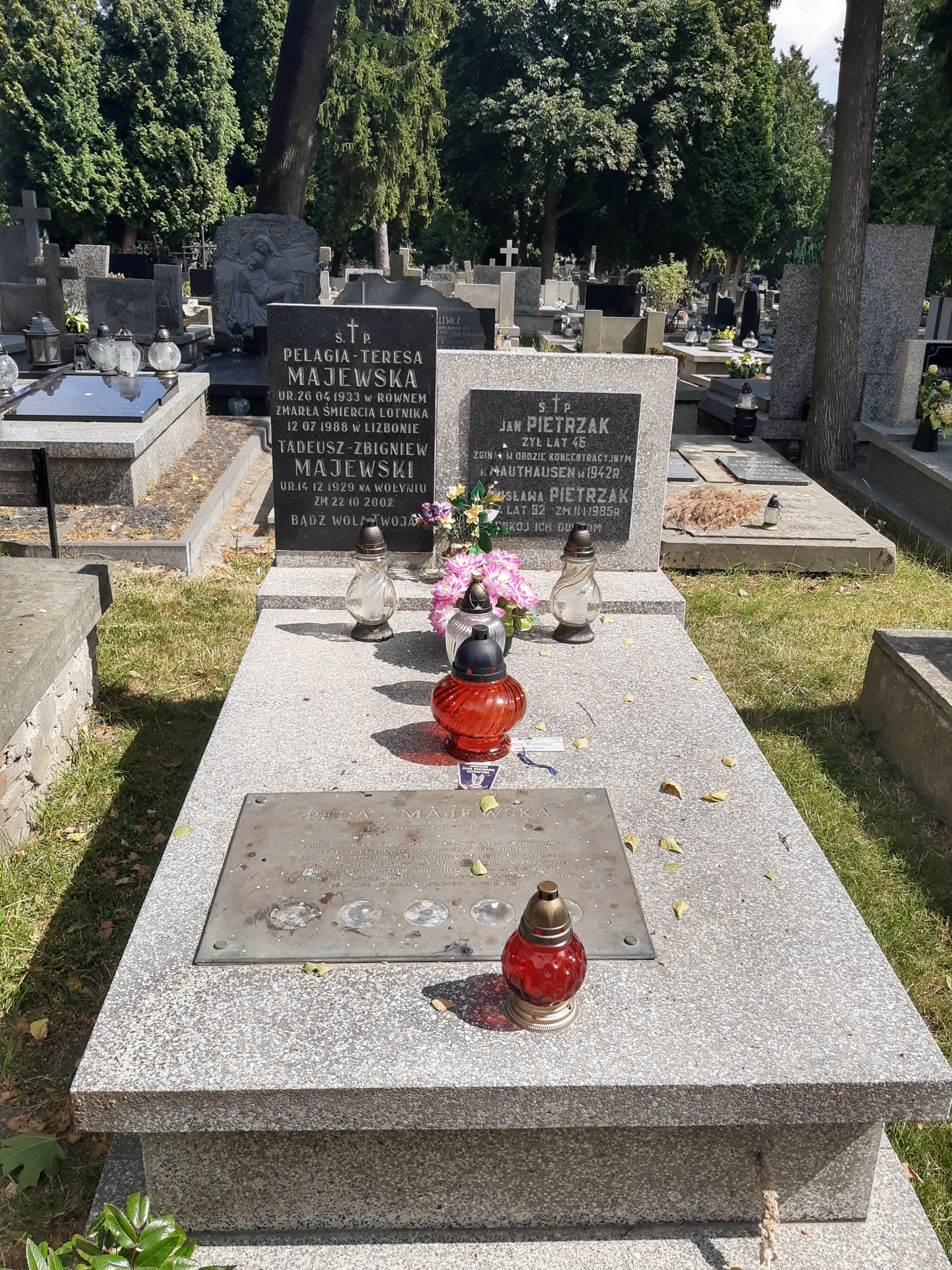
Pelagia Majewska's grave

In 2008, the ALTAIR Aviation Agency published a book by Irena Kostka, Majewska's sister and fellow pilot, entitled Szybowniczka Świata (Gliderwoman of the World), dedicated to Pelagia Majewska's sporting and professional career.
