= Janusz Centka =

Polish glider pilot (born 1950)

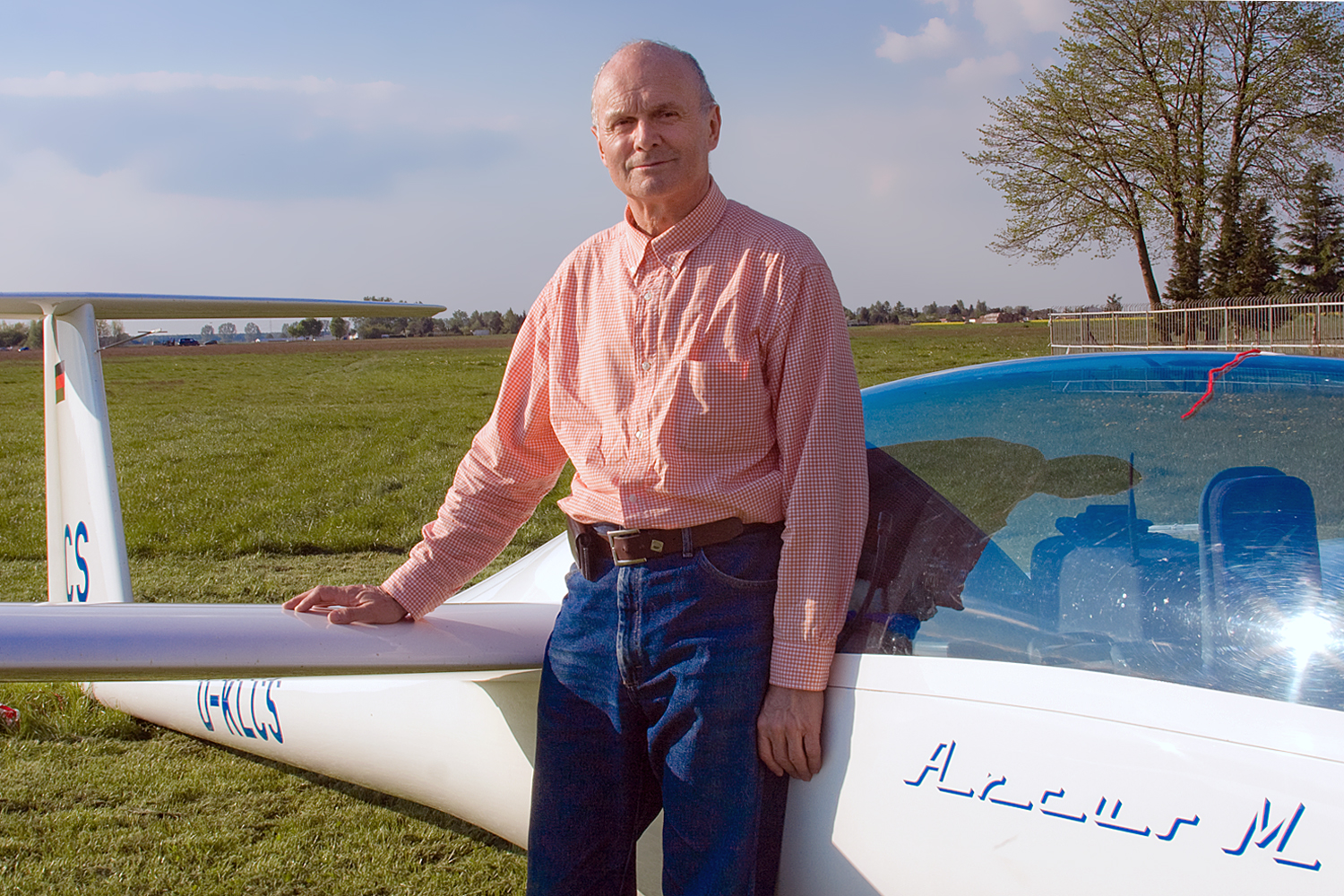
Janusz Centka, Leszno 2014

Janusz Centka (born 20 April 1950, in Tonowo) is a Polish glider pilot who has won two European and three World Gliding Championships.

In 2002 he established a world record in speed over a triangular course of 1000 km (144.95 km/h) in the 15m class in a SZD 56 Diana from Ely, Nevada (USA). In 2003, he was awarded the Paul Tissandier Diploma, and in 2004 he was awarded the Lilienthal Gliding Medal by the Fédération Aéronautique Internationale gliding commission.

He is a member of the gliding club at Leszno and works as a Boeing 767 captain and flight instructor for PLL LOT.
