= Franciszek Kępka =

Franciszek Kepka
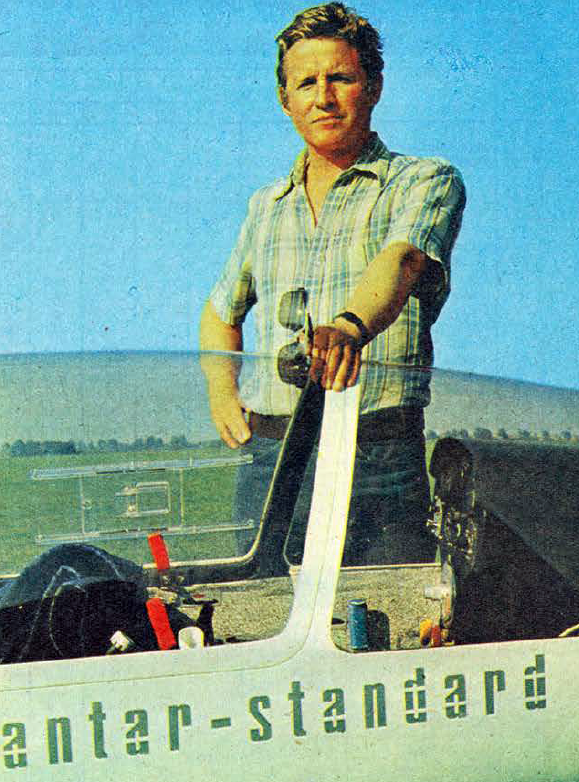
- Kępka in 1977
- Born: 4 April 1940; Goleszów
- Died: 15 December 2001 (aged 61); Skoczów
- Known for: Europe Champion title 1992
- Relatives: father Franciszek Kępka senior, glider pilot
- Aviation career
- First flight: 1950

Franciszek Kępka (April 4, 1940 – December 15, 2001) was a Polish glider pilot.

== Biography ==
He was the son of Franciszek Kępka senior. He performed his first flight at the age of 10. He became European champion in 1992 in Szeged, Hungary, in the same year he received the Lilienthal Gliding Medal and was awarded the Paul Tissandier Diploma. During his career he flew over 150 000 kilometers and flew more than 6 500 hours in gliders.

== Greatest achievements ==
Achievements in international FAI championships (Standard Class)
| year | competition | ranking |
|---|---|---|
| 1965 | 10th FAI World Gliding Championships | 3 |
| 1970 | 12th FAI World Gliding Championships | 3 |
| 1972 | 13th FAI World Gliding Championships | 3 |
| 1974 | 14th FAI World Gliding Championships | 3 |
| 1990 | 5th FAI European Gliding Championships | 2 |
| 1992 | 6th FAI European Gliding Championships | 1 |
