= Klaus Ohlmann =

German aviator

Klaus Ohlmann (born 1952 in Neustadt an der Aisch, Germany) is a German glider pilot who has established 36 world records approved by FAI. Among these is the record for a free distance flight with up to 3 turn-points by flying 3,009 km from Chapelco Airport at San Martín de los Andes (Argentina) in a Schempp-Hirth Nimbus 4 DM on 21 January 2003 with his co-pilot Karl Rabeder. On 9 January 2003 at El Calafate in Argentina he made a flight of 2,247.6 km in a Schempp-Hirth Nimbus 4 DM. This set a new world free distance record, breaking the record set over 30 years earlier by Hans-Werner Grosse.

On 1 February 2014, he became the first–ever pilot to fly over Mount Everest in a glider.

He is a member of the Mountain Wave Project of the meteorological section of OSTIV. Flying in wave conditions is his forte. Klaus lives in southern France, near Serres, Hautes-Alpes.

== Solar-powered pending claim at FAI ==
Claim number : 16110 Sub-class :CS (Solar-Powered Aeroplane) Type of record : Free out-and-return distance Course/location : _to be advised Performance : 155.8 km Pilot : Klaus OHLMANN (Germany) Aircraft : ICARE 2 Date :22.09.2010 Current record : no record set yet

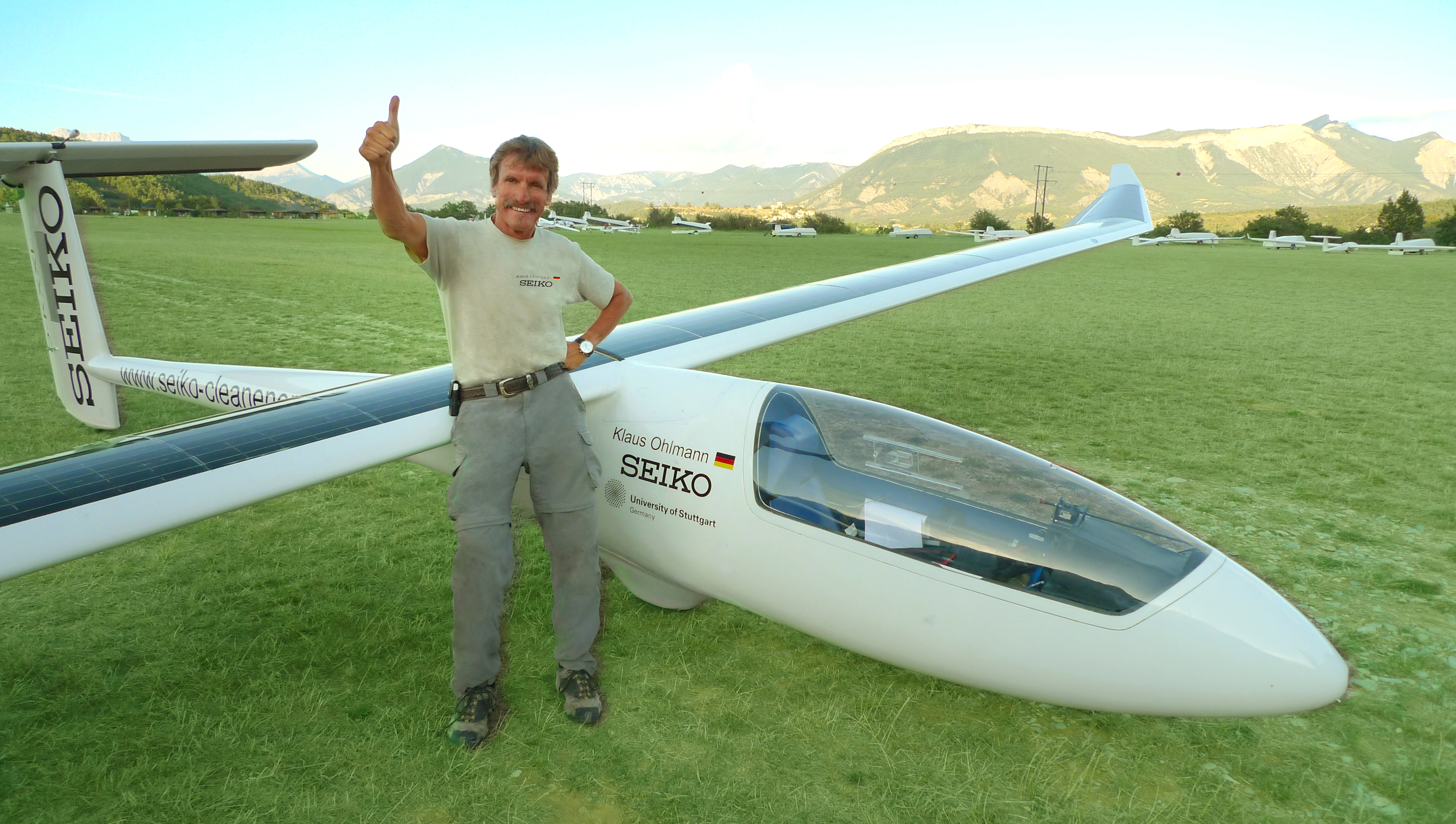
Klaus Ohlmann & Icare 2

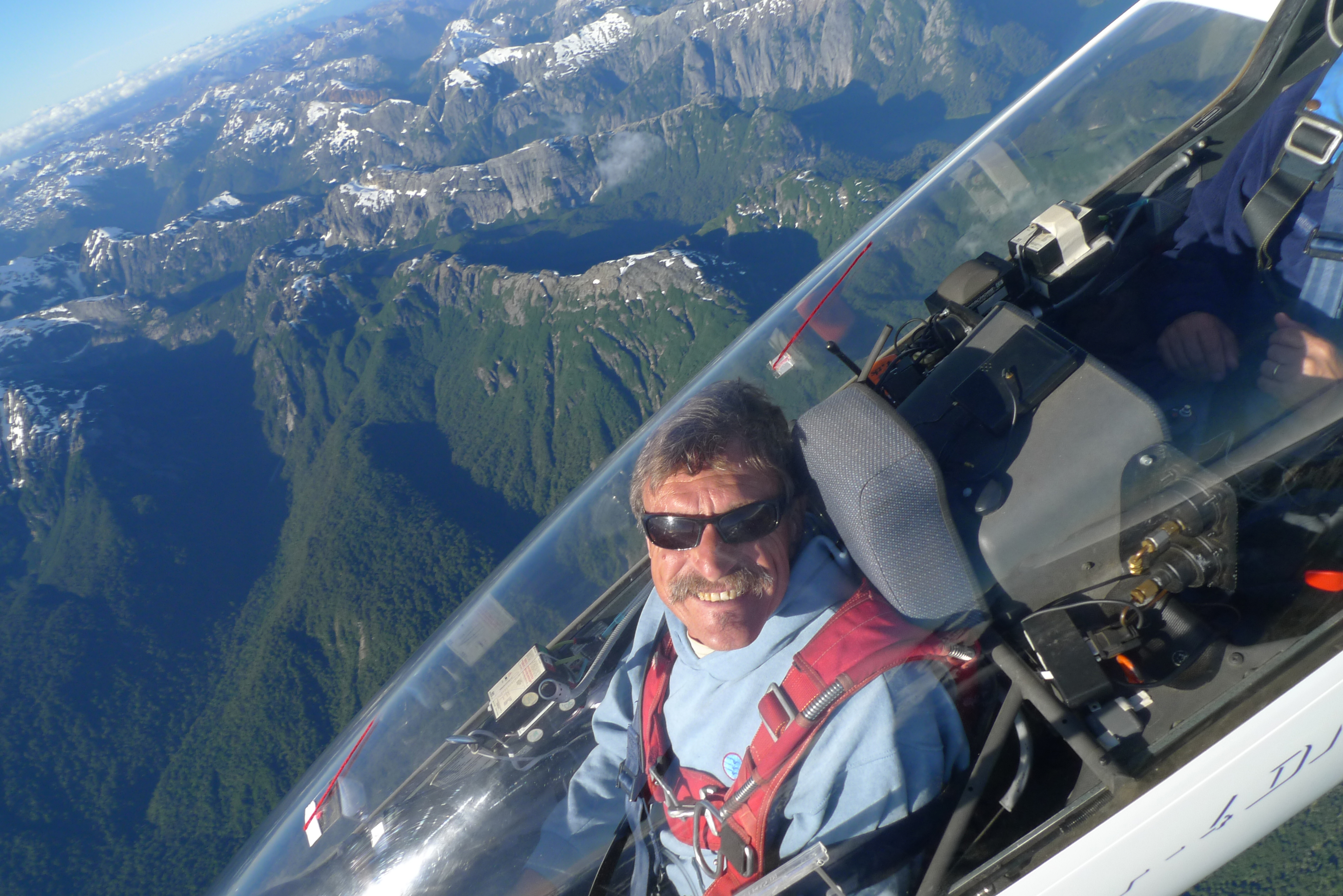
Klaus Ohlmann
