= Ingo Renner =

German-born Australian glider pilot (1940–2022)

Ingo Renner OAM (1 June 1940 – 26 February 2022) was an Australian glider pilot. He won the World Gliding Championships four times.

Renner was born in Hude in Germany and started gliding in 1954 at the LSV Hude (gliding club of Hude) of which he was an honorary member. In 1967 he moved to Australia and was granted Australian citizenship in 1971. He flew over 37,000 hours.

== Occupation as a gliding instructor ==
Renner joined Bill Riley's Sportavia Soaring Centre, a commercial gliding operation in Tocumwal (New South Wales), as flight instructor shortly after moving to Australia. From 1974, he worked during the European summers as a flight instructor at the Oerlinghausen training centre and at its branches in southern Europe, such as at Sondrio. Each year he returned to Australia for the southern summer. At the age of 65, he retired after working thirty seasons at Oerlinghausen. In 2006, Sportavia Soaring Centre closed but the Murray Border Flying Club extended its operations to include gliding. In 2009 the Southern Riverina Gliding club was formed, and Renner was its chief flying instructor for gliding.

== Dynamic soaring ==
Renner is reported to have utilized the dynamic soaring technique with a Glasflügel H-301 Libelle at Tocumwal in 1974 and later flights in an Eiri-Avion PIK-20.

== Records and FAI Badges ==
In addition to several Australian records, Renner established two world records. In 1975, he and Hilmer Geissler flew a two-seat glider (Caproni Vizzola Calif A-21) a straight distance of 970.4 kilometres (603.0 mi) from Bendigo in Victoria to Langley, a location approximately 120 kilometres (75 mi) west of Bundaberg in Queensland. In 1982, he flew a Schempp-Hirth Nimbus-3 around a 100 kilometres (62 mi) triangular course from Tocumwal airfield, New South Wales at an average speed of 195.30 kilometres per hour (121.35 mph). In addition to his FAI gliding Gold badge with three diamonds, he earned the 27th FAI 1000 kilometre badge by a 1,015.50 kilometres (631.00 mi) flight in a Schempp-Hirth Nimbus-2 from Tocumwal airfield, New South Wales in 1980.

== Achievements in competitions ==
In 1976 Renner won the World Gliding Championships in the Standard Class. In 1983, 1985 and 1987 he was World Champion in the Open Class. He also received the Dr. Mervyn Hall Trophy by the GFA as the Australian (Open Class) Champion in 1971/72, 1972/73, 1979/80, 1981/82, 1982/83, 1983/84 and 1991/92, and the GFA Shield (Team Trophy) in the seasons 1971/72, 1984/85, 1985/86, 1988/89, 1989/90, 1990/91 and 1998/99. He was Australian National Champion a total of nineteen times.

Renner was still taking part in the decentralized soaring competition OLC until 2021.

== Other awards and honours ==
External image
- Ingo Renner in the Sport Australia Hall of Fame

Renner was inducted into the Sport Australia Hall of Fame in 1987. In 1988, he was awarded the FAI Lilienthal Gliding Medal and the Medal of the Order of Australia. In 2000 he was awarded the Australian Sports Medal.

== Family ==
Renner's wife Judy is also a talented glider pilot. She has four daughters and eight grandchildren.
