= Organisation Scientifique et Technique du Vol à Voile =

Organisation Scientifique et Technique du Vol à Voile (OSTIV) is a body associated with the FAI Gliding Commission (IGC). The FAI IGC oversees the sport of gliding worldwide and is a department of the Fédération Aéronautique Internationale (FAI).

In 1930 the first international soaring organization, ISTUS, (Internationale Studienkommission für den motorlosen Flug) was formed with the objective of the furtherance of development of soaring in science and technical aspects by "exchanging experience and friendly cooperation among the specialists and pilots of all nations engaged in soaring". This objective was continued after World War II by the formation of OSTIV.

OSTIV's aim is also the furtherance of the technical development of soaring by the sharing of experience by glider manufacturers and glider pilots. It was formed as the successor of ISTUS on 27 July 1948 at Samedan, Switzerland. Its sections include the Meterorological Panel, the Sailplane Development Panel and the Training & Safety Panel. It publishes the scientific journal Technical Soaring.

OSTIV has the right to send observers to the meetings of the FAI Gliding Commission and vice versa. OSTIV's Congresses generally take place at the same time and place as the World Gliding Championships.

== See also ==
- National gliding associations
