= Philip Wills =

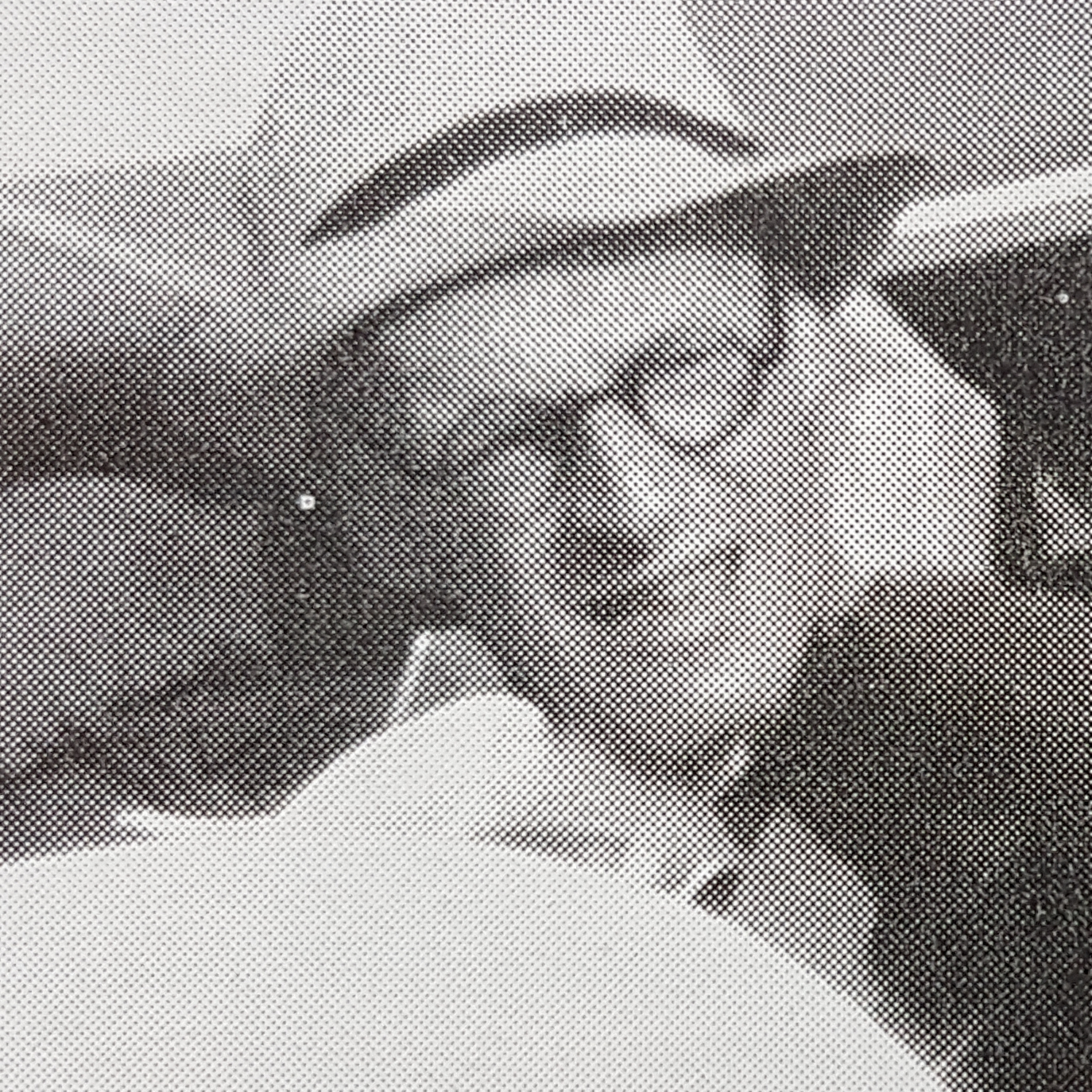
Portrait of Philip Wills, Chairman of the British Gliding Association (BGA)

Philip Aubrey Wills CBE (26 May 1907 – 16 January 1978) was a pioneering British glider pilot. He broke several UK gliding records from the 1930s to the 1950s. He was also an experienced pilot of light aircraft.

== 1940s ==
In World War II he was second in command of the Air Transport Auxiliary which administered the flying of new aircraft from their manufacturers to operational airfields. Many ATA pilots were female and could not fly on operational squadrons. For this work was awarded the CBE medal.

== 1950s ==
After WW2 he was involved in UK gliding administration including being Chairman of the British Gliding Association (BGA) for 19 years, a record duration.

Resuming flying glider flying after the war, in 1952 he was Open Class World Champion in the world gliding championships in Spain. He was a member of the British Gliding Team until 1958.

In 1964 he was awarded the Lilienthal Gliding Medal of the Fédération Aéronautique Internationale (FAI) for services to gliding.

== Early years ==
Philip Wills was from a wealthy family in the shipping and export business. There is a story that when he became an executive, he installed internal windows in offices in case staff were reading books or falling asleep in working hours.

At the age of 21 he was able to buy his first aircraft, a de Havilland DH.60 Moth. On 20 January 1929 he was injured when his Moth (G-EBPS) crashed at Duxford Aerodrome, in which the other pilot was killed. He later purchased a replacement Moth (G-EBOI). He later bought and flew a twin-engined GA Monospar General Aircraft Monospar.

He began gliding at the London Gliding Club in 1933. On 18 March 1934, he set two records in a DFS Professor; these were the British National Gain-of-Height gliding record of 3,800 feet, and a Distance record with a flight of 56 miles from Dunstable Downs to Latchington, Essex. He was just beaten to the first British Silver C Badge by Eric Collins, who already had the Silver C five-hour qualification. Philip then did his "five hours" and received International Silver C Badge No. 45 shortly after.

From 1934 he was active in the affairs of the British Gliding Association (BGA), when he was able to co-ordinate a change in its constitution to ensure that it represented gliding clubs, not a just small number of individual members.

On 30 April 1938 he broke the British National Distance gliding record in his Göppingen Gö 3 Minimoa (BGA338), flying 209 miles from Heston Aerodrome (A short distance NE of the present Heathrow airport) to St Austell in Cornwall.

In June 1938, he broke the British National Distance Gain of Height gliding record at 10,180 feet over Dunstable Downs, earning him the world's third Gold C Badge. On 1 July 1939, he again broke the height record at 14,170 feet

== World War II ==
In 1940, the RAF was concerned that radar (the UK "Chain Home" system) might not detect troop-carrying gliders made of wood that the Germans could use in an invasion of England. To check this, Wills and some other UK glider pilots were towed out to sea in wooden gliders from a field near the Radar station at Worth Matravers on the coast south of Bournemouth . The gliders acted as over-sea radar targets and then glided back to land in the field. However, on one flight on returning over the sea to the field it became evident to Wills that his angle of glide would not get back over the cliff. Because from flights over Dunstable Downs he was well aware of so-called "ridge lift" where air rises over an up-slope, on arriving below the cliff top he was able to use the rising air due to the off-shore wind over the cliff to gain enough height to land safely back in the field. Meanwhile, people rushed to the spot last seen on the radar, to peer anxiously down over the cliff edge to look for a crashed glider, while Wills looked down from above.

Later in World War II he was second in command of the Air Transport Auxiliary, in charge of allocating ATA pilots to collecting aircraft from factories and ferrying them to RAF Squadron bases. After the end of the war he was able to fly a small transport aircraft to Germany and retrieve a Weihe glider back to the UK where it flew for several years and provided an example for future UK glider designs by Slingsby Aviation.

== Post-war ==
He became General Manager (Technical) of British European Airways for two years.

In 1949 he became managing director of Fowlie, Reid & Wills Limited.

In 1952 in Spain, he became Open Class World Champion flying a Slingsby Sky sailplane, and was a member of the British Gliding Team until 1958. In 1954 he became the second person to cross the English Channel in a glider after Geoffrey H. Stephenson's first crossing in 1938.

Philip was Chairman of the British Gliding Association for 19 years, a current record. During his period in office, his connections and reputation with government bodies allowed British gliding to regulate itself without much intervention from government agencies. He also successfully fought to minimise the amount of controlled airspace in the UK, aided by BGA Airspace Committee Chairman Nicholas Goodhart, a Navy Pilot who later became a Rear Admiral.

In 1954 Philip's services to world gliding were recognised by the award of the Otto Lilienthal Medal by the FAI.

== Personal life ==
He married Katherine 'Kitty' Fisher in 1931, they had three sons and a daughter. His sons Chris and Justin Wills became famous glider pilots. He also had a son named Stephen. Chris became Chairman of the European Historic Glider Group for which he was awarded an International FAI award. Justin emigrated to New Zealand and owned an estate from which people could fly the New Zealand high altitude wave system.

After Philip's death, the Philip Wills Memorial Fund was established to provide financial help to deserving organisations in the British gliding movement.
