= Edward Makula =

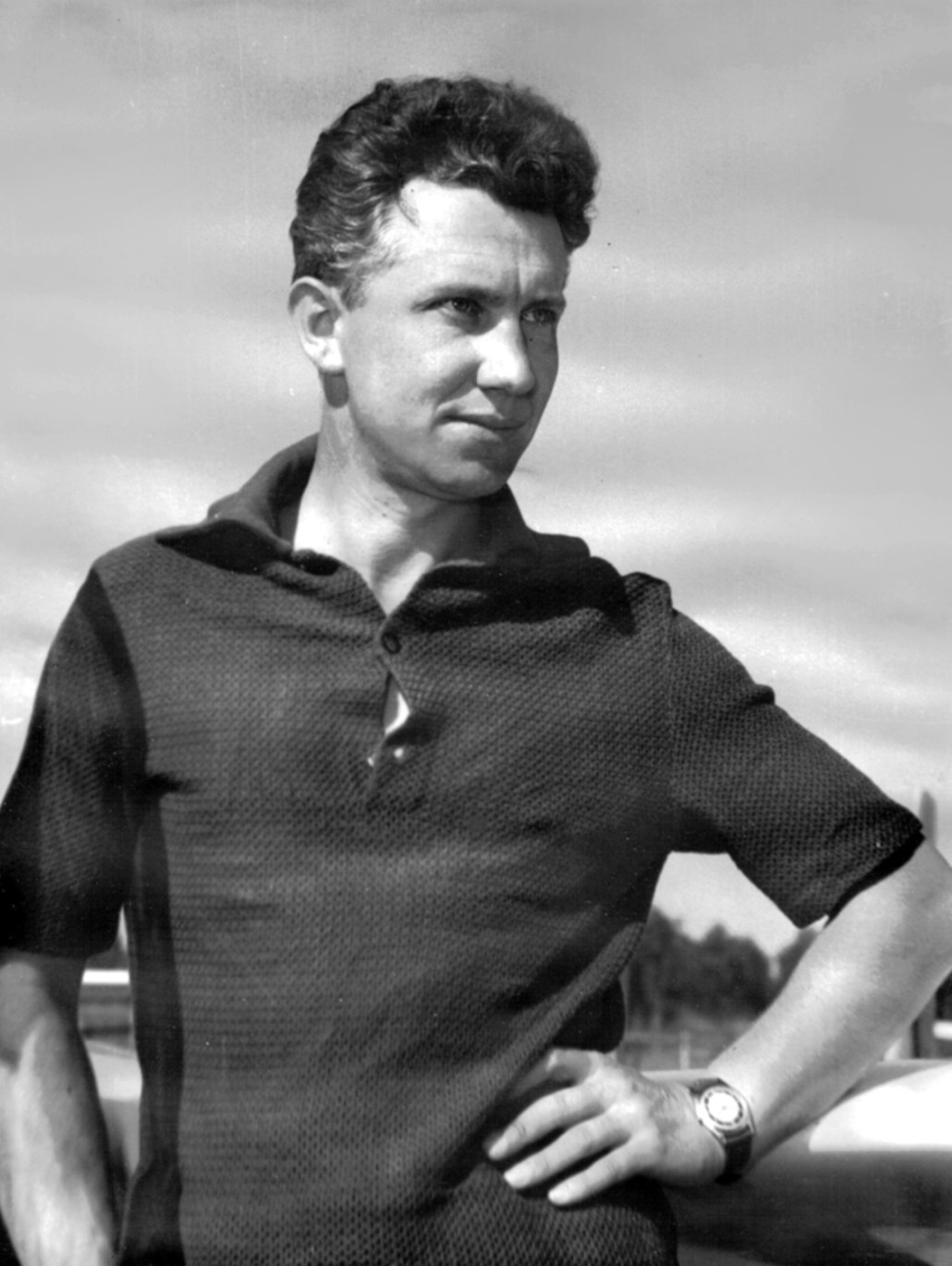
- Born: 4 July 1930
- Died: 15 January 1996 (aged 65)

Edward Makula (4 July 1930 – 15 January 1996) was a Polish glider pilot and engineer.

He won the 1963 World Gliding Championships in Junin (Argentina) in a SZD-19 Zefir 2 and established 7 world records. In 1965, the Fédération Aéronautique Internationale (FAI) awarded him the Lilienthal Gliding Medal.

World Gliding Records by Edward Makula
date	category	achievement	course	glider
16 August 1955	single place gliders	speed over a triangular course of 200 km: 67.304 km/h	Lisie Katy - Przepalkowo - Zblewo - Lisie Katy (Poland)	SZD-8 Jaskółka
31 July 1972	two place gliders, crew: John Serafin (USA)	speed over a triangular course of 300 km: 113.72 km/h	Douglas County, NV - Bridgeport, CA - Rawhide, NV - Douglas County, NV (USA)	Caproni Vizzola Calif A-21
4 August 1972	two place gliders, crew: John Serafin (USA)	speed over a triangular course of 500 km : 101.18 km/h	Douglas County, NV - Susanville, CA - Old Lovelock, NV - Douglas County, NV (USA)	Caproni Vizzola Calif A-21
6 August 1972	two place gliders, crew: Hugo G. Taskovich (USA)	speed over a triangular course of 100 km : 130.73 km/h	Minden, NV - Dayton, NV - Valley View, NV - Minden, NV (USA)	Caproni Vizzola Calif A-21
8 August 1972	two place gliders, crew: John Serafin (USA)	out-and-return distance: 718.2 km	Douglas County, NV - Darwin Airport, CA - Douglas County, NV (USA)	Caproni Vizzola Calif A-21
20 July 1974	two place gliders, crew: Adèle Orsi	speed over a triangular course of 500 km : 114.86 km/h	Douglas County, NV - Chalfant, CA - Gabbs, NV - Douglas County, NV (USA)	Caproni Vizzola Calif A-21
24 August 1974	two place gliders, crew: John Serafin (USA)	speed over a triangular course of 300 km : 122.06 km/h	Minden, NV (USA) - ...	Caproni Vizzola Calif A-21

Edward Makula was an uncle of the glider aerobatics champion Jerzy Makula.
