= Adela Dankowska =

Polish aviator and politician (born 1935)

Adela Stanisława Dankowska
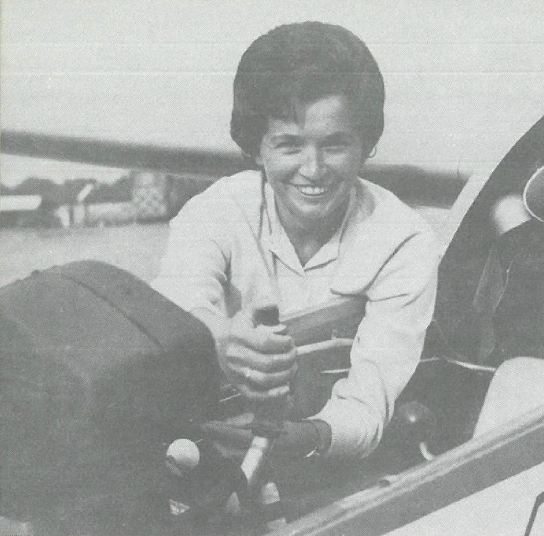
- Born: 5 January 1935 (age 91); Sobienie-Jeziory

Adela Stanisława Dankowska (born 5 January 1935 in Sobienie-Jeziory) is a retired Polish aviator and politician. She was a glider pilot and the coach of the Polish national gliding team, and also served as a member of Parliament.

== Biography ==
Dankowska was born in Sobienie-Jeziory in Lublin Voivodeship, Poland. She studied biology at the Warsaw University of Life Sciences, graduating in 1959, and learnt to fly at the Aero Club of Warsaw.

She held 12 world records during her flying career, and 43 Polish records, including the world record for distance travelled in a straight line, in 1977 (837 km) and the women's world record for height gain, in 1967 (8,430 m). She also held the record for the longest glider flight in Poland, reaching a distance of 837 km in 1974.

From 1989 to 1991 Dankowska served as a member of the Parliament of Poland. She has also served on the city council of Leszno and the city's regional council.

She is a member of the National Council of Aviation and a member of the Air National Examination Board.

== Recognition ==
In 1970, Dankowska received the Polish Silver Cross of Merit, and in 1975 she received the Lilienthal Gliding Medal for her achievements in the sport. In 1977 she received a medal from the province of Leszno and in 1978 she received the Knight's Cross of the Order of Polonia Restituta. In 1981 she received the Medal of the National Education Commission (in Polish, Medal Komisji Edukacji Narodowej). She has also received six Gold Medals for outstanding achievements in sport.
