= Tadeusz Góra =

Polish aviator

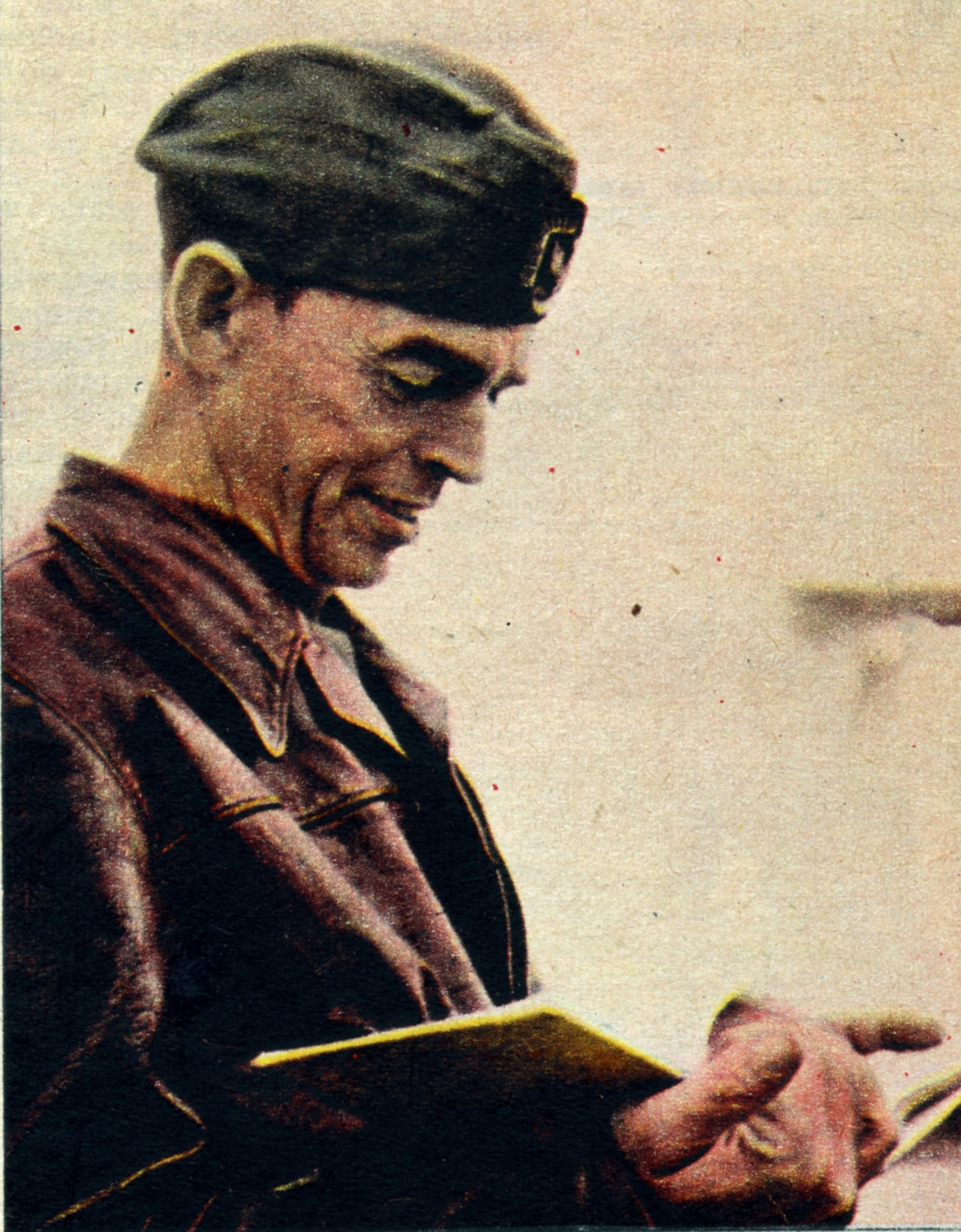
- Born: Tadeusz Góra; 19 January 1918; Kraków, Austria-Hungary
- Died: 4 January 2010 (aged 91); Świdnik, Poland
- Military career
- Allegiance: Poland
- Branch: Polish Air Force
- Service years: from 1939
- Conflicts: World War II
- Awards: Lilienthal Gliding Medal (1938)
- Other work: glider pilot, flight instructor

Tadeusz Góra (19 January 1918 – 4 January 2010) was a Polish glider and fighter pilot.

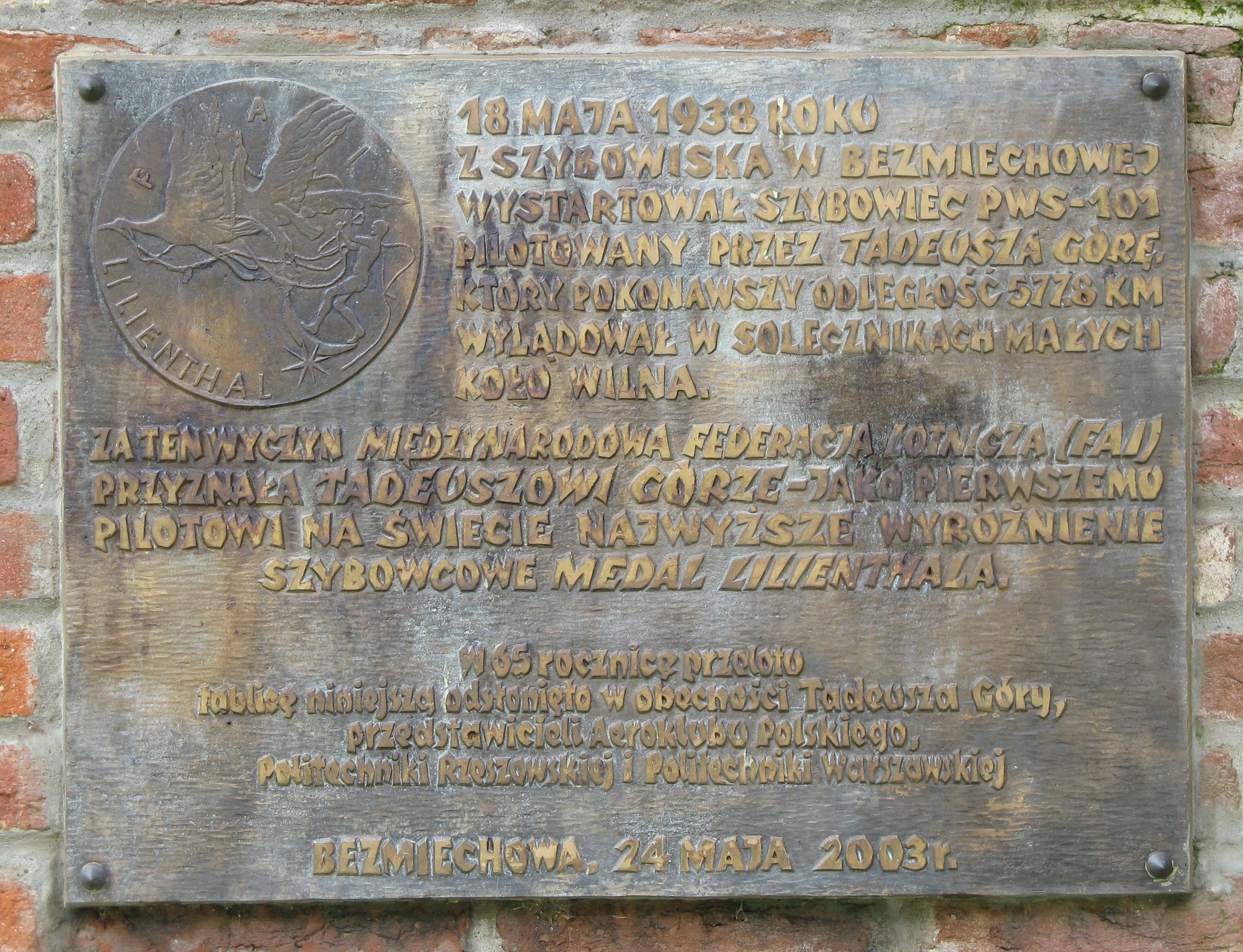
Plaque at Bezmiechowa honoring Góra's record flight

Born in Kraków, Austria-Hungary he was the first winner of the Lilienthal Gliding Medal in the world for his record-breaking 577.8-kilometer flight on 18 May 1938 in a PWS-101 from Bezmiechowa to Soleczniki (near Vilnius).

With the outbreak of the Second World War, he was detailed by the Soviets, but escaped. He worked in Vilnius for a while, then obtained a passport which enabled him to travel to France. When that country fell to the Germans, he fled to the UK.

During the war, he flew with the Royal Air Force (RAF), serving on three Polish RAF fighter squadrons: first No. 316, later No. 306 and No. 315. In late August 1940, Góra served with the RAF's No 2 AACU before undertaking advanced training with 61 OTU at Heston. As a sgt. pilot, Góra was posted to No. 316 (Polish) Squadron, flying the Spitfire, flying his first operation on 18 November 1941, a convoy patrol. On 10 April 1942 he claimed a Focke-Wulf Fw 190 damaged, and on 3 June 1942 he claimed another Fw 190 shot down over Le Havre. In early 1943 Góra studied at the Infantry Cadet and Cavalry Academy in Scotland, and was promoted to pilot officer. On 13 May 1943 Góra destroyed a Bf 109G and on 27 August 1943 he shot down another of this type. On 4 September 1943, while escorting a USAAF formation of B-17s near Lille, he claimed a Fw 190 damaged. After the war, following research on Luftwaffe loss data, the aircraft was identified as a Bf 109 and classified as "destroyed." P/O Góra was posted to No. 316 Squadron in April 1944 flying the P-51 Mustang. From June to October 1944, he destroyed two locomotives near Bremen, and damaged a German submarine. Góra also flew 28 flights anti- V-1 “flying bombs” operations; one such bomb he destroyed on 31 July 1944. He performed his final operational flight of his tour on 22 October 1944 over Heligoland.

After the end of the war, he was discharged as a flight lieutenant. He had been awarded the Silver Cross of Virtuti Militari Order, the Cross of Valour three times.

Tadeusz Góra returned to Poland in 1948, as a senior instructor at the Żar Glider School near Żywiec.

He died in Świdnik on 4 January 2010.
