= Anne Burns =

British engineer and pilot (1915–2001)

- Born: 23 November 1915; Haworth, West Riding of Yorkshire, England
- Died: 22 January 2001 (aged 85)
- Occupations: Aeronautical engineer, glider pilot

Anne Burns (23 November 1915 – 22 January 2001) was a British aeronautical engineer and glider pilot. She had a career of nearly 40 years in the Royal Aircraft Establishment at Farnborough as an engineer and an expert in wind shear. She flew many sorties on engineering tests with the Farnborough Test Pilots.

As a glider pilot, she obtained the British woman's record for highest altitude, and was the first woman to cross the English Channel in a glider.

== Early life ==
Anne Pellew was born in Haworth, Yorkshire. She attended The Abbey School, Reading, and then went to St Hugh's College, Oxford, where, only the second woman to read Engineering Sciences at Oxford University, she was awarded the Edgell Shepee Scholarship (the first woman to receive it) and graduated with a First in 1936. She also won a hockey Blue and squash 'Half Blue'.

== RAE Farnborough ==
Burns did research work under Professor Richard Southwell at the university's engineering laboratory. Together they wrote one of the early theoretical papers on Rayleigh-Benard convection. At the outbreak of the Second World War she applied to join the Air Transport Auxiliary as a ferry pilot, but her engineering expertise precluded this and in 1940 she was employed by the Ministry of Supply, joining what became the Structures and Mechanical Department at the Royal Aircraft Establishment (RAE) at Farnborough, Hampshire, as a scientific assistant.

Her early work concentrated on flutter problems and on the measurement of the loads imposed on aircraft structures during flight. Other wartime tasks included the development of windscreen wipers for bombers and the double windscreen enclosing a supply of warm air to improve visibility. During this time she made test flights in many types of military aircraft from Tiger Moths to Hawker Typhoons and Gloster Meteors.

In the late 1940s she was the first flight-test observer (FTO) in the UK to use strain gauges in an aircraft in flight. In 1953 she became a Principal Scientific Officer. During the investigation in 1954 into the crashes of the early de Havilland Comet jet airliners, she made many flights as an FTO in unpressurised Comets, sometimes up to 40,000 feet. It was known that the aircraft had broken up in flight while flying above 25,000 ft. In her own words "We flew about waiting for the windows to blow out." The following year Burns was awarded the Queen's Commendation for Valuable Service in the Air in recognition of her bravery and contribution to the investigation. In 1958 she was also awarded the R. P. Alston Medal by the Royal Aeronautical Society for this work.

She became an expert on clear-air turbulence due to "wind-shear", caused by different air movement (wind) at altitudes close to each other, such as at the edge of a high-level "jet stream". Some of her research into turbulent air was conducted in a Fournier RF 4. In 1963 she was awarded a second Queen's Commendation, this time for her flights in an English Electric Canberra carrying out low- and high-level-gust research. Some of the low level flights were carried out in high temperatures in Libya from the RAF Stations at El Adem near Tobruk and RAF Idris near Tripoli.

The Royal Aeronautical Society awarded her the Silver Medal for Aeronautics in 1966, and in 1968, when she was working on clear-air turbulence, flying as an observer in several countries, she was presented with the Whitney Straight Award for her services to aeronautical research and flying. She retired from the RAE in 1976 after accumulating 1,500 hours of flight time as an observer. She met her husband Denis Burns at the RAE and they married in 1947.

== Gliding ==
Having flown military assault gliders during the war, Burns took up gliding as a sport in 1954 winning awards and establishing both national and international records for women. On her first cross-country flight, from Lasham, Hampshire in an Eon Olympia she reached RAF Ternhill, Shropshire in 4hr 55min breaking the British women's distance record. In December 1956, she flew a Slingsby Skylark 3b to 11,890 feet (3,620 m) setting new women's British national and UK absolute altitude and gain-of-height records. Again flying a Skylark 3, she became the first woman to cross the English Channel in a glider in 1957. She was presented with the British Women Pilots' Association's Jean Lennox Bird Trophy on 28 April 1960 by Lord Brabazon of Tara for her record flight on 10 May 1959, breaking all then existing British women's glider records.

By 1961 she held 10 of the 11 UK women's records including the current altitude record of 10,550 metres (34,610 ft). In breaking the altitude record in South Africa she had entered the base of a cumulonimbus cloud at about 6,000 ft above ground. On the way up, there were electrical discharges to the pilot's knees from various metal parts of the aircraft. At about 34,000 ft there was a nearby major strike which discharged itself violently through the left wing. A small panel from the wing was blown away. Anne was temporarily confused by this shock but, coming-to more or less instantaneously, she decided it was time to get out of the cloud and descend.

In 1962, Anne and Denis Burns were jointly awarded the Royal Aero Club's Britannia Trophy for their gliding achievements. In 1963 she claimed the women's world record for speed over a 500 km triangular course of 103.33 km/h. In 1966 she became British Gliding Champion, the first woman to hold the title. She received many other awards for gliding achievements including the Fédération Aéronautique Internationale Lilienthal Gliding Medal in 1966.

In 1977 her glider tail parachute deployed unexpectedly at high altitude. She decided to bail out but became tangled in the parachute's shroud lines, nevertheless escaping with only an injured ankle by landing in a sycamore tree. She thus became the first woman since the 1930s to become a member of Irvin's Caterpillar Club and aged 62, she was also the oldest person ever to join this club. She then gave up gliding and took up fly fishing and snooker, again winning awards in both sports.

Anne Burns died on 22 January 2001.
