= World Gliding Championships =

Aviation sporting event

The World Gliding Championships (WGC) is a gliding competition held roughly every two years by the FAI Gliding Commission. The dates are not always exactly two years apart, often because the contests are always held in the summer in either the Southern Hemisphere or Northern Hemisphere.

== History ==
Gliding had been a demonstration sport at the 1936 Summer Olympics and was due to become an official Olympic sport in the Helsinki Games in 1940. However, since the Second World War, gliding has not featured in the Olympics, and so the World Championships are the highest level in the sport. There are now contests for six classes of glider and so in recent years the Championships have been divided between two locations. The women's, junior, grand prix and aerobatic events are also held separately.

Each of the following entries give the year and location of the contest followed by the winner of each class, nationality and the glider used.

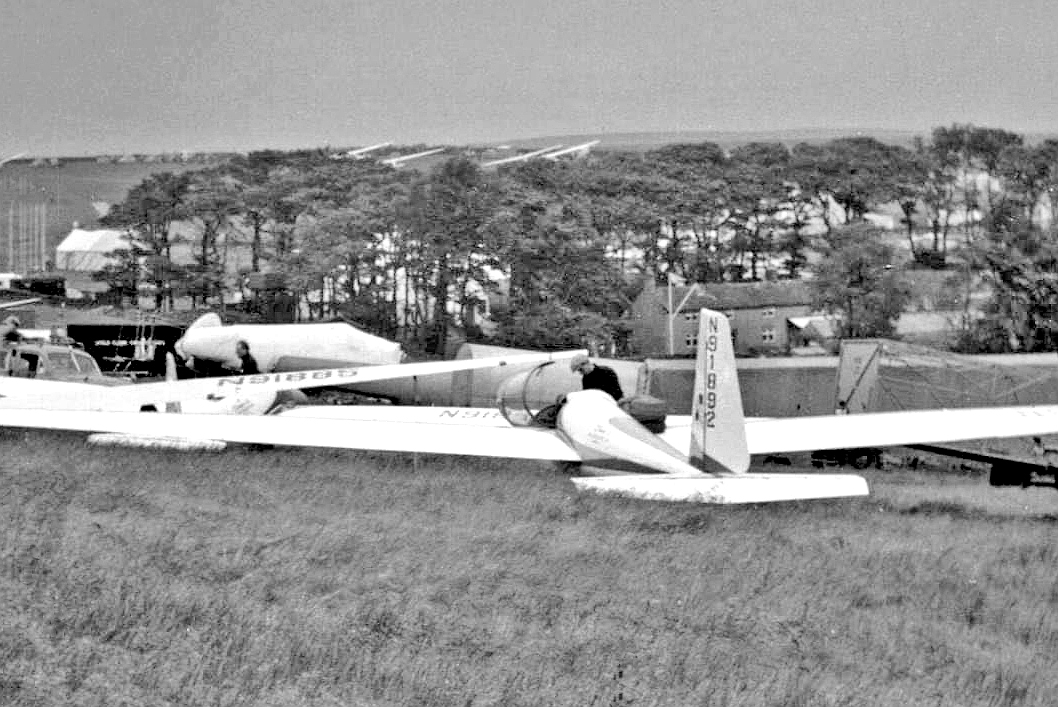
Sailplanes at the 1954 Championships with the three Schweizers of the USA team in the foreground

Year	Location	Class	Winner	Glider	Notes
1937	(Germany) Wasserkuppe	Open	(Germany) Heini Dittmar	Fafnir São Paulo	This was thought not to be a true world championship and was just an 'International Competition', but it has been acknowledged as the first World Gliding Championship.
1948	(Switzerland) Samedan	Open	(Sweden) Per-Axel Persson	DFS Weihe	
1950	(Sweden) Örebro	Open	(Sweden) Billy Nilsson	DFS Weihe	
1952	(Spain) Madrid	Open	(United Kingdom) Philip Wills	Slingsby Sky	Hanna Reitsch was bronze, the first woman to compete.
1952	(Spain) Madrid	Two Seater	(Spain) Luis Juez (Spain) Roberto Bermúdez	DFS Kranich	
1954	(United Kingdom) Camphill Farm, Great Hucklow	Open	(France) Gerard Pierre	Breguet 901	
1954	(United Kingdom) Camphill Farm, Great Hucklow	Two Seater	(Socialist Federal Republic of Yugoslavia) Zvonimir Rain (Socialist Federal Republic of Yugoslavia) Bozidar Komac	Ikarus Košava	
1956	(France) Saint-Yan	Open	(United States) Paul MacCready	Breguet 901	
1956	(France) Saint-Yan	Two Seater	(United Kingdom) Nick Goodhart (United Kingdom) Frank Foster	Slingsby Eagle	
1958	(Polish People's Republic) Leszno	Open	(West Germany) Ernst Haase	HKS-3	
1958	(Polish People's Republic) Leszno	Standard	(Polish People's Republic) Adam Witek	SZD-22 Mucha Standard	
1960	(West Germany) Cologne/Köln	Open	(Argentina) Rodolfo Hossinger	Slingsby Skylark 3	Rolf on his Swedish passport.
1960	(West Germany) Cologne/Köln	Standard	(West Germany) Heinz Huth	Schleicher Ka 6BR	
1963	(Argentina) Junín	Open	(Polish People's Republic) Edward Makula	SZD-19 Zefir 2	
1963	(Argentina) Junín	Standard	(West Germany) Heinz Huth	Schleicher Ka 6	
1965	(United Kingdom) South Cerney	Open	(Polish People's Republic) Jan Wróblewski	SZD-24 Foka 4	
1965	(United Kingdom) South Cerney	Standard	(France) François-Louis Henry	Siren Edelweiss	
1968	(Polish People's Republic) Leszno	Open	(Austria) Harro Wodl	Schempp-Hirth Cirrus	
1968	(Polish People's Republic) Leszno	Standard	(United States) Andrew Smith	Neukom S-3 Standard-Elfe	
1970	(United States) Marfa, Texas	Open	(United States) George Moffat	Schempp-Hirth Nimbus	
1970	(United States) Marfa, Texas	Standard	(West Germany) Helmut Reichmann	Rolladen-Schneider LS1-c	
1972	(Socialist Federal Republic of Yugoslavia) Vršac	Open	(Sweden) Göran Ax	Schempp-Hirth Nimbus-2	
1972	(Socialist Federal Republic of Yugoslavia) Vršac	Standard	(Polish People's Republic) Jan Wróblewski	SZD-43 Orion	
1974	(Australia) Waikerie	Open	(United States) George Moffat	Schempp-Hirth Nimbus-2	
1974	(Australia) Waikerie	Standard	(West Germany) Helmut Reichmann	Rolladen-Schneider LS2	
1976	(Finland) Räyskälä Airfield, Loppi	Open	(United Kingdom) George Lee	Schleicher ASW 17	
1976	(Finland) Räyskälä Airfield, Loppi	Standard	(Australia) Ingo Renner	Eiri PIK-20B	
1978	(France) Châteauroux	Open	(United Kingdom) George Lee	Schleicher ASW 17	
1978	(France) Châteauroux	15 metre	(West Germany) Helmut Reichmann	Akaflieg Braunschweig SB-11	
1978	(France) Châteauroux	Standard	(Netherlands) Baer Selen	Schleicher ASW 19	
1981	(West Germany) Paderborn	Open	(United Kingdom) George Lee	Schempp-Hirth Nimbus-3	
1981	(West Germany) Paderborn	15 metre	(Sweden) Göran Ax	Schleicher ASW 20	
1981	(West Germany) Paderborn	Standard	(France) Marc Schroeder	Rolladen-Schneider LS4	
1983	(United States) Hobbs, New Mexico	Open	(Australia) Ingo Renner	Schempp-Hirth Nimbus-3	
1983	(United States) Hobbs, New Mexico	15 metre	(Netherlands) Kees Musters	Schempp-Hirth Ventus A	
1983	(United States) Hobbs, New Mexico	Standard	(Denmark) Stig Øye	Rolladen-Schneider LS4	
1985	(Italy) Rieti	Open	(Australia) Ingo Renner	Schempp-Hirth Nimbus-3	
1985	(Italy) Rieti	15 metre	(United States) Doug Jacobs	Rolladen-Schneider LS6	
1985	(Italy) Rieti	Standard	(Italy) Leonardo Brigliadori	Schempp-Hirth Discus	
1987	(Australia) Benalla	Open	(Australia) Ingo Renner	Schleicher ASW 22B	Gliding Club of Victoria
1987	(Australia) Benalla	15 metre	(United Kingdom) Brian Spreckley	Rolladen-Schneider LS6	Gliding Club of Victoria
1987	(Australia) Benalla	Standard	(Finland) Markku Kuittinen	Schempp-Hirth Discus-a	Gliding Club of Victoria
1989	(Austria) Wiener Neustadt	Open	(France) Jean-Claude Lopitaux	Schleicher ASW 22B	
1989	(Austria) Wiener Neustadt	15 metre	(West Germany) Bruno Gantenbrink	Schempp-Hirth Ventus C	
1989	(Austria) Wiener Neustadt	Standard	(France) Jacques Aboulin	Schempp-Hirth Discus	
1991	(United States) Uvalde	Open	(Poland) Janusz Centka	Schleicher ASW 22B	
1991	(United States) Uvalde	15 metre	(Australia) Brad Edwards	Rolladen-Schneider LS6-b	
1991	(United States) Uvalde	Standard	(Netherlands) Baer Selen	Schempp-Hirth Discus	
1993	(Sweden) Borlänge	Open	(Poland) Janusz Centka	Schleicher ASW 22B	
1993	(Sweden) Borlänge	15 metre	(France) Gilbert Gerbaud (France) Eric Napoleon	Rolladen-Schneider LS6-b; Rolladen-Schneider LS6-b	
1993	(Sweden) Borlänge	Standard	(United Kingdom) Andrew Davis	Schempp-Hirth Discus-B	
1995	(New Zealand) Omarama	Open	(New Zealand) Ray Lynskey	Schempp-Hirth Nimbus-4	
1995	(New Zealand) Omarama	15 metre	(France) Eric Napoleon	Schempp-Hirth Ventus-2	
1995	(New Zealand) Omarama	Standard	(Finland) Markku Kuittinen	Schempp-Hirth Discus-a	
1997	(France) Château-Arnoux-Saint-Auban	Open	(France) Gérard Lherm	Schempp-Hirth Nimbus-4	
1997	(France) Château-Arnoux-Saint-Auban	15 metre	(Germany) Werner Meuser	Schempp-Hirth Ventus-2a	
1997	(France) Château-Arnoux-Saint-Auban	Standard	(France) Jean-Marc Caillard	Rolladen-Schneider LS8-a	
1997	(Turkey) İnönü, Eskişehir	World	(France) Frederic Hoyeau	PZL PW-5	
1999	(Germany) Bayreuth	Open	(Germany) Holger Karow	Schempp-Hirth Nimbus-4	
1999	(Germany) Bayreuth	15 metre	(Italy) Giorgio Galetto	Schempp-Hirth Ventus-2	
1999	(Germany) Bayreuth	Standard	(France) Jean-Marc Caillard	Schempp-Hirth Discus-2a	
1999	(Poland) Leszno	World	(France) Henry Julien	PZL PW-5	
2001	(South Africa) Mafikeng	Open	(South Africa) Oscar Goudriaan	Schleicher ASW 22 BLE	
2001	(South Africa) Mafikeng	15 metre	(Germany) Werner Meuser	Schempp-Hirth Ventus-2ax	
2001	(South Africa) Mafikeng	Standard	(France) Laurent Aboulin	Schempp-Hirth Discus-2a	
2001	(Australia) Gawler	Club	(United Kingdom) Peter Masson	Glaser-Dirks DG-101	
2001	(Spain) Lillo	18 metre	(United Kingdom) Stephen Jones	Schempp-Hirth Ventus-2	
2001	(Spain) Lillo	World	(France) Olivier Darroze	PZL PW-5	
2002	(Germany) Musbach	Club	(Czech Republic) Tomáš Suchánek	Schempp-Hirth Standard Cirrus	
2003	(Poland) Leszno	Open	(Germany) Holger Karow	Nimbus-4M	
2003	(Poland) Leszno	18 metre	(Austria) Wolfgang Janowitsch	Schempp-Hirth Ventus-2cx	
2003	(Poland) Leszno	15 metre	(New Zealand) John Coutts	Schleicher ASW 27B	3
2003	(Poland) Leszno	Standard	(United Kingdom) Andrew Davis	Schempp-Hirth Discus-2a	
2003	(Slovakia) Nitra	World	(Poland) Sebastian Kawa	PZL PW-5	
2004	(Norway) Elverum	Club	(Poland) Sebastian Kawa	SZD-48-3M Jantar 3	
2006	(Sweden) Eskilstuna	Open	(Germany) Michael Sommer	Schleicher ASW 22 BLE	
2006	(Sweden) Eskilstuna	18 metre	(United Kingdom) Phil Jones	Schempp-Hirth Ventus-2cxt	
2006	(Sweden) Eskilstuna	15 metre	(Poland) Janusz Centka	SZD 56-2 Diana 2	
2006	(Sweden) Eskilstuna	Standard	(United Kingdom) Leigh Wells	Rolladen-Schneider LS8	
2006	(France) Vinon-sur-Verdon	Club	(Poland) Sebastian Kawa	SZD-48-3M Jantar 3	
2006	(France) Vinon-sur-Verdon	World	(France) Christophe Ruch	PZL PW-5	
2008	(Italy) Rieti	Standard	(Germany) Michael Buchthal	Schempp-Hirth Discus-2	
2008	(Italy) Rieti	Club	(Germany) Matthias Sturm	Glasflügel 206 Hornet	
2008	(Italy) Rieti	World	(France) Laurent Couture	PZL PW-5	
2008	(Germany) Lüsse	Open	(Germany) Michael Sommer	Schleicher ASW 22 BLE	
2008	(Germany) Lüsse	18 metre	(France) Olivier Darroze	Schleicher ASG 29-18	
2008	(Germany) Lüsse	15 metre	(Hungary) György Gulyas	Schempp-Hirth Ventus-2a	
2010	(Slovakia) Prievidza	Standard	(Poland) Sebastian Kawa	Schempp-Hirth Discus-2a	3 – 18 July 2010
2010	(Slovakia) Prievidza	Club	(Germany) Arndt Hovestadt	Glasflügel Standard Libelle	3 – 18 July 2010
2010	(Slovakia) Prievidza	World	(France) Laurent Couture	PZL PW-5	3 – 18 July 2010
2010	(Hungary) Szeged	Open	(Germany) Michael Sommer	Binder EB29	20 July – 7 August 2010
2010	(Hungary) Szeged	18 metre	(Poland) Zbigniew Nieradka	Schleicher ASG 29-18	20 July – 7 August 2010
2010	(Hungary) Szeged	15 metre	(Italy) Stefano Ghiorzo	SZD 56-2 Diana 2	20 July – 7 August 2010
2012	(United States) Uvalde	Open	(France) Laurent Aboulin	Schempp-Hirth Quintus M	28 July – 19 August
2012	(United States) Uvalde	18 metre	(Poland) Zbigniew Nieradka	Schleicher ASG 29-18	28 July – 19 August
2012	(United States) Uvalde	15 metre	(Poland) Sebastian Kawa	SZD 56-2 Diana 2	28 July – 19 August
2013	(Argentina) Adolfo Gonzales Chaves, Buenos Aires	Standard	(Poland) Sebastian Kawa	Schempp-Hirth Discus-2a	6 – 19 January 2013
2013	(Argentina) Adolfo Gonzales Chaves, Buenos Aires	Club	(Argentina) Santiago Berca	SZD-48 Jantar Standard 2	6 – 19 January 2013
2013	(Argentina) Adolfo Gonzales Chaves, Buenos Aires	World	(Argentina) Sebastián Riera	PZL PW-5	Last World class world championship
2014	(Finland) Räyskälä Airfield, Loppi	Club	(France) Eric Bernard	Schempp-Hirth Standard Cirrus	22 June – 5 July 2014
2014	(Finland) Räyskälä Airfield, Loppi	Standard	(Belgium) Bert Schmelzer	Schempp-Hirth Discus-2a	22 June – 5 July 2014
2014	(Finland) Räyskälä Airfield, Loppi	20m Multi-Seat	(United Kingdom) Steve Jones (United Kingdom) Howard Jones	Schempp-Hirth Arcus T	22 June – 5 July 2014
2014	(Poland) Leszno	Open	(Germany) Michael Sommer	Binder EB29	26 July – 10 August 2014 Photo-gallery
2014	(Poland) Leszno	18 metre	(Poland) Karol Staryszak	Schleicher ASG 29-18	26 July – 10 August 2014 Photo-gallery
2014	(Poland) Leszno	15 metre	(Poland) Sebastian Kawa	SZD 56-2 Diana 2	26 July – 10 August 2014 Photo-gallery
2015	(Lithuania) Pociūnai	13.5 metre	(Italy) Stefano Ghiorzo	Diana 2 Versus	2–15 August 2015
2016	(Lithuania) Pociūnai	Club	(Germany) Jan Rothhardt	Rolladen-Schneider LS1-d	31 July – 13 August 2016
2016	(Lithuania) Pociūnai	Standard	(France) Louis Bouderlique	Schempp-Hirth Discus-2a	31 July – 13 August 2016
2016	(Lithuania) Pociūnai	20m Multi-Seat	(France) Laurent Aboulin (France) Julien Duboc	Schempp-Hirth Arcus T	31 July – 13 August 2016
2017	(Australia) Benalla	Open	(United Kingdom) Russell Cheetham	Jonker JS-1C	9 – 21 January 2017
2017	(Australia) Benalla	18 metre	(France) Killian Walbrou	Jonker JS-1	9 – 21 January 2017
2017	(Australia) Benalla	15 metre	(Poland) Sebastian Kawa	SZD 56-2 Diana 2	9 – 21 January 2017
2017	(Hungary) Szatymaz	13.5 metre	(Poland) Sebastian Kawa	GP 14 VELO	3–15 July 2017
2018	Ostrów Wielkopolski, Poland	Club	(Denmark) Rasmus Ørskov	Schleicher ASW 20	7–21 July 2018
2018	Ostrów Wielkopolski, Poland	Standard	(Netherlands) Sjaak Selen	Schempp-Hirth Discus-2a	7–21 July 2018
2018	Ostrów Wielkopolski, Poland	15 metre	(Poland) Sebastian Kawa	Schleicher ASG 29	7–21 July 2018
2018	Hosín, Czech Republic	Open	(Germany) Michael Sommer	Binder EB29	27 July – 11 August 2018
2018	Hosín, Czech Republic	18 metre	(Austria) Wolfgang Janowitsch	Ventus-3T	27 July – 11 August 2018
2018	Hosín, Czech Republic	20 m Multi-seat	(Poland) Christoph Matkowski (Poland) Sebastian Kawa	Schleicher ASG 32 Mi	27 July – 11 August 2018
2019	Pavullo nel Frignano, Italy	13.5 metre	(Italy) Stefano Ghiorzo	Diana VersVS	1–14 September 2019
2021	(France) Montluçon – Guéret	15 metre	(Poland) Sebastian Kawa	SZD 56-2 Diana 2	7 – 21 August 2021
2021	(France) Montluçon – Guéret	Standard	(Germany) Simon Schröder	Rolladen-Schneider LS8	7 – 21 August 2021
2021	(France) Montluçon – Guéret	Club	(Germany) Uwe Wahlig	Rolladen-Schneider LS3	7 – 21 August 2021
2022	Pociūnai, Lithuania	13.5 metre	(Netherlands) Nick Hanenburg	Mini LAK	3–15 July 2022
2022	Szeged, Hungary	Open	(Germany) Felipe Levin	Binder EB-29 R	24 July – 5 August 2022
2022	Szeged, Hungary	18 metre	(France) Christophe Abadie	Jonker JS-3	24 July – 5 August 2022
2022	Szeged, Hungary	20 m Multi-seat	(Czech Republic) Ivan Novák (Czech Republic) Petr Krejčiřík	Arcus M	24 July – 5 August 2022
2023	(Australia) Narromine	15 metre	(Poland) Sebastian Kawa	SZD 56-2 Diana 2	3 – 15 December 2023
2023	(Australia) Narromine	Standard	(United Kingdom) Tom Arscott	Rolladen-Schneider LS8	3 – 15 December 2023
2023	(Australia) Narromine	Club	(Australia) James Nugent	Rolladen-Schneider LS3	3 – 15 December 2023
2024	Uvalde, United States	Open	(Germany) Felipe Levin	Binder EB-29 R	18 – 30 August 2024
2024	Uvalde, United States	18 metre	(Germany) Stefan Langer	AS 33 Me	18 – 30 August 2024
2024	Uvalde, United States	20 m Multi-seat	(United States) Sarah Arnold (United States) Karl Striedieck	Arcus M	18 – 30 August 2024
2025	(Czech Republic) Tábor	15 metre	(Poland) Łukasz Grabowski	SZD 56-2 Diana 2	8 – 20 June 2025
2025	(Czech Republic) Tábor	Standard	(Belgium) Jeroen Jennen	Rolladen-Schneider LS8	8 – 20 June 2025
2025	(Czech Republic) Tábor	Club	(Germany) Stefan Langer	Rolladen-Schneider LS3	8 – 20 June 2025
2026	Kościelec, Poland	Open	(Germany) Felipe Levin	Binder EB-29 R	17 – 29 May 2026
2026	Kościelec, Poland	18 metre	(France) Victor Mallick	Jonker JS-3	17 – 29 May 2026
2026	Kościelec, Poland	20 m Multi-seat	(Germany) Karsten Leucker (Germany) Jan Omsels	Schempp-Hirth Arcus T	17 – 29 May 2026

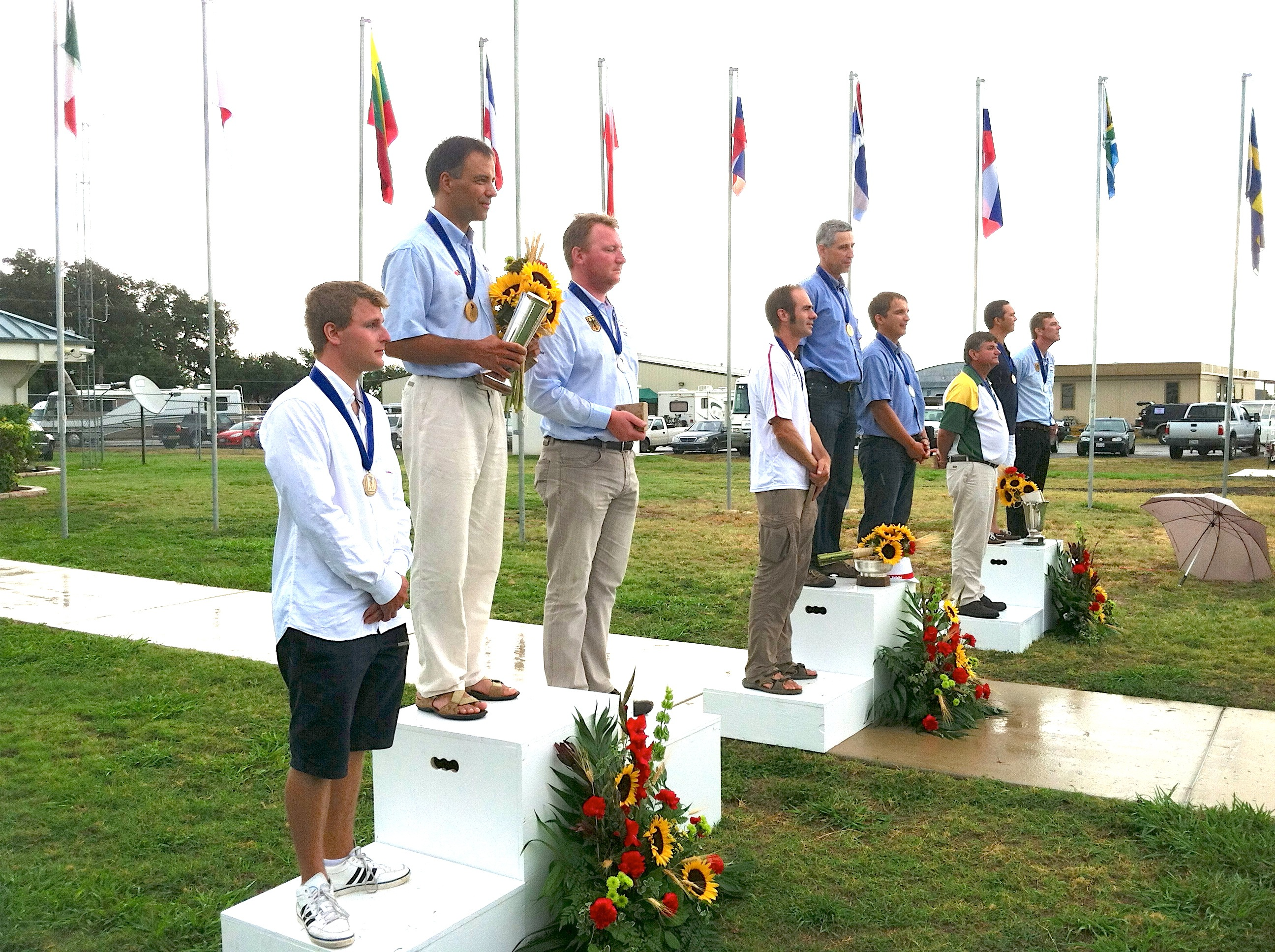
Uvalde 2012 award ceremony

A list of future events is available here

== FAI Sailplane Grand Prix ==
The FAI Sailplane Grand Prix (SGP) (Gliding Grand Prix) is a series of international gliding competitions created by the Fédération Aéronautique Internationale (FAI) to make the sport of soaring more accessible and exciting for the public. Unlike traditional gliding championships, which often involve staggered starts, complex scoring, and long tasks that are difficult for spectators to follow, the SGP format features a simultaneous start, clearly defined racing rules, and a “first across the finish line wins” principle. This produces fast-paced, head-to-head racing that is easier to understand and more dramatic to watch.

Each Grand Prix race typically covers 200–300 kilometres, lasts two to three hours, and is contested by up to 20 pilots flying high-performance sailplanes. Points are awarded to the leading finishers on each racing day, with the overall winner crowned at the end of the series. Through innovations such as real-time GPS tracking, livestreamed video, and on-board pilot commentary, the SGP has become one of the most spectator-friendly formats in competitive gliding.

Since its launch in 2005, there have been 12 SGP series, with the 13th series scheduled to begin in 2026. Each series normally features around ten Qualifying SGP events held at soaring sites across the globe. The top two pilots from each qualifying event advance to the World Final, where a field of 20 of the world’s best sailplane pilots compete head-to-head for the coveted title of FAI Sailplane Grand Prix World Champion.

Season	Location	Winner		Second		Third	
Season	Location	Pilot	Glider	Pilot	Glider	Pilot	Glider
2005	(France) Château-Arnoux-Saint-Auban	(Poland) Sebastian Kawa	SZD 56 Diana 2	(Germany) Mario Kiessling	Schempp-Hirth Ventus-2ax	(Czech Republic) Petr Krejčiřík	Schempp-Hirth Ventus-2ax
2006–2007	(New Zealand) Omarama	(Poland) Sebastian Kawa	SZD 56 Diana 2	(Germany) Uli Schwenk	Schempp-Hirth Ventus-2ax	(New Zealand) Ben Flewett	Schleicher ASW 27
2008–2009	(Chile) Santiago	(Poland) Sebastian Kawa	SZD 56 Diana 2	(Chile) Carlos Rocca Vidal	Schempp-Hirth Ventus-2b	(Germany) Mario Kiessling	Schempp-Hirth Ventus-2ax
2010–2011	(Germany) Wasserkuppe	(Italy) Giorgio Galetto	Schempp-Hirth Ventus-2ax	(Germany) Sebastian Nägel	Schleicher ASW 27	(Austria) Peter Hartmann	Schempp-Hirth Ventus-2ax
2012–2014	(France) Vaumeilh near Sisteron	(France) Didier Hauss	Schempp-Hirth Ventus-2cxa	(Poland) Sebastian Kawa	SZD 56 Diana 2	(Germany) Uli Schwenk	Schempp-Hirth Ventus-2cxa
2014–2015	(Italy) Varese	(France) Maximilian Seis	Jonker JS-1 evo	(France) Christope Ruch	Jonker JS-1 evo	(Poland) Sebastian Kawa	Schleicher ASG 29-18
2015–2016	(South Africa) Potchefstroom	(Germany) Holger Karow	Jonker JS-1 evo	(South Africa) Oscar Goudriaan	Jonker JS-1 evo TJ	(France) Christophe Abadie	Jonker JS-1 evo TJ
2018	(Chile) Vitacura	Sebastian Kawa (Poland)	Jonker JS-1 evo	Sebastian Nägel (Germany)	Ventus-3TS	Mario Kiessling (Germany)	Ventus-3TS
2019	(Spain) La Cerdanya	Tilo Holighaus (Germany)	Ventus-3TS	Sebastian Kawa (Poland)	MD-JS3 Jet	Louis Bouderlique (France)	MD-JS3
2021	(France) Château-Arnoux-Saint-Auban	(Poland) Sebastian Kawa	AS33ES	Mario Kiessling (Germany)	Ventus-3TS	Maximilian Seis (France)	MD-JS3
2022-2023	(Italy) Pavullo nel Frignano	(Germany) Stefan Langer	Schleicher ASG 29-18	(Netherlands) Erik Borgmann	MD-JS3	(Germany) Hermann Leucker	MD-JS3
2024-2025	(France) Château-Arnoux-Saint-Auban	(France) Maximilian Seis	Ventus 3-18	(France) Christophe Abadie	MD-JS3	(France) Kévin Faur	MD-JS3

== Women's World Gliding Championships ==
The Women's World Gliding Championships (WWGC) is a women-only gliding competition. From 1979 to 1999 women's gliding competitions were held as International European Women's Gliding Championships.

Year	Location	Class	Winner	Glider	Notes
2001	(Lithuania) Pociūnai	Club	(Russia) Tamara Sviridova	SZD-48 Jantar Standard	
2001	(Lithuania) Pociūnai	Standard	(United Kingdom) Sarah Steinberg	Schleicher ASW 24	née Harland
2001	(Lithuania) Pociūnai	15 metre	(United Kingdom) Gillian Spreckley	Schempp-Hirth Ventus-2a	
2003	(Czech Republic) Jihlava	Club	(Germany) Christine Grote	Glasflügel Standard Libelle	
2003	(Czech Republic) Jihlava	Standard	(Germany) Cornelia Schaich	Rolladen-Schneider LS8-b	
2003	(Czech Republic) Jihlava	15 metre	(Czech Republic) Alena Netušilová	Schempp-Hirth Ventus-2a	
2005	(Germany) Klix	Club	(Czech Republic) Hana Vokřínková	Schempp-Hirth Standard Cirrus	
2005	(Germany) Klix	Standard	(Czech Republic) Jana Vepřeková	Rolladen-Schneider LS8-b	
2005	(Germany) Klix	15 metre	(Denmark) Mette Pedersen	Schleicher ASW 27B	
2007	(France) Romorantin	Club	(United Kingdom) Gillian Spreckley	Rolladen-Schneider LS1-f	
2007	(France) Romorantin	Standard	(United Kingdom) Sarah Kelman	Schleicher ASW 28	née Harland
2007	(France) Romorantin	15 metre	(Germany) Katrin Senne	Schempp-Hirth Ventus-2a	
2009	(Hungary) Szeged	Club	(France) Nathalie Hurlin	Schempp-Hirth Standard Cirrus	
2009	(Hungary) Szeged	Standard	(Germany) Sue Kussbach	Rolladen-Schneider LS8-b	
2009	(Hungary) Szeged	15 metre	(Germany) Susanne Schödel	Schempp-Hirth Ventus-2a	
2011	(Sweden) Arboga	Club	(Denmark) Agnete Olesen	Glasflügel Standard Libelle WL	
2011	(Sweden) Arboga	Standard	(Germany) Sue Kussbach	Rolladen-Schneider LS8-b	
2011	(Sweden) Arboga	15 metre	(Germany) Susanne Schödel	Ventus-2ax	
2013	(France) Issoudun	Club	(Germany) Christine Grote	Glasflügel Standard Libelle WL	
2013	(France) Issoudun	Standard	(Germany) Sue Kussbach	Rolladen-Schneider LS8-b	
2013	(France) Issoudun	15 metre	(France) Anne Ducarouge	Schleicher ASG 29	
2015	(Denmark) Herning	Club	(Germany) Sabrina Vogt	Glasflügel Standard Libelle	
2015	(Denmark) Herning	Standard	(France) Aude Grangeray	Rolladen-Schneider LS8	
2015	(Denmark) Herning	15 metre	(France) Anne Ducarouge	Schleicher ASG 29	
2017	(Czech Republic) Zbraslavice	Club	(Germany) Sabrina Vogt	Glasflügel Standard Libelle	
2017	(Czech Republic) Zbraslavice	Standard	(France) Aude Grangeray	Schempp-Hirth Discus-2A	
2017	(Czech Republic) Zbraslavice	18 metre	(Germany) Katrin Senne	Schleicher ASG 29	
2020	(Australia) Lake Keepit	Club	(Italy) Elena Fergnani	Schempp-Hirth Discus	
2020	(Australia) Lake Keepit	Standard	(United States) Sarah Arnold	Schempp-Hirth Discus-2	
2020	(Australia) Lake Keepit	18 metre	(France) Mélanie Gadoulet	Jonker JS-3 Rapture	
2022	(United Kingdom) Husbands Bosworth	Club	(Czech Republic) Petra Pískatá	Rolladen-Schneider LS4	
2022	(United Kingdom) Husbands Bosworth	Standard	(Germany) Cornelia Schaich	Rolladen-Schneider LS8	
2022	(United Kingdom) Husbands Bosworth	18 metre	(France) Anne Ducarouge	Jonker JS-3 Rapture	
2023	(Spain) Garray	Club	(France) Louise Rodriguez	Rolladen-Schneider LS7	
2023	(Spain) Garray	Standard	(Czech Republic) Barbora Moravcová	Rolladen-Schneider LS8	
2023	(Spain) Garray	18 metre	(Czech Republic) Alena Netušilová	Jonker JS-3 Rapture	
2025	(Czech Republic) Zbraslavice	Club	(Czech Republic) Tereza Koubková	Rolladen-Schneider LS4	
2025	(Czech Republic) Zbraslavice	Standard	(Czech Republic) Klára Teichmannová	Rolladen-Schneider LS8	
2025	(Czech Republic) Zbraslavice	18 metre	(Czech Republic) Alena Netušilová	Jonker JS-3 RES	

== Junior World Gliding Championships ==
The Junior World Gliding Championships (JWGC) is a competition for glider pilots under the age of 26. From 1991 to 1997, international junior gliding competitions were held as European Junior Gliding Championships.

Year	Location	Class	Winner	Glider	Notes
1999	(Netherlands) Terlet	Standard	(Germany) Gunther Stahl	Schempp-Hirth Discus-2b	
1999	(Netherlands) Terlet	Club	(Germany) Robert Scheiffarth	Schleicher ASW 19b	
2001	(France) Issoudun	Standard	(United Kingdom) Jay Rebbeck	Rolladen-Schneider LS8	
2001	(France) Issoudun	Club	(Denmark) Peter Toft	Glasflügel Standard Libelle	
2003	(Slovakia) Nitra	Standard	(United Kingdom) Jeremy Hood	Rolladen-Schneider LS8	
2003	(Slovakia) Nitra	Club	(Germany) Michael Streit	Schleicher ASW 19	
2005	(United Kingdom) Husbands Bosworth	Standard	(United Kingdom) Mark Parker	Rolladen-Schneider LS8	
2005	(United Kingdom) Husbands Bosworth	Club	(Germany) Christoph Nacke	Rolladen-Schneider LS1	
2007	(Italy) Rieti	Standard	(Germany) Patrick Gai	Rolladen-Schneider LS8	
2007	(Italy) Rieti	Club	(France) Killian Walbrou	Schempp-Hirth Standard Cirrus 75	
2009	(Finland) Räyskälä	Standard	(Germany) Felipe Levin	Schempp-Hirth Discus-2	
2009	(Finland) Räyskälä	Club	(Germany) Volker Sailer	Glasflügel Standard Libelle	
2011	(Germany) Freudenstadt Musbach	Standard	(Germany) Felipe Levin	Schempp-Hirth Discus-2a	
2011	(Germany) Freudenstadt Musbach	Club	(Netherlands) Tim Kuijpers	Schempp-Hirth Standard Cirrus	
2013	(Poland) Leszno	Standard	(Netherlands) Peter Millenaar	Schempp-Hirth Discus-2a	
2013	(Poland) Leszno	Club	(France) Valentin Grit	Glasflügel 206 Hornet	
2015	(Australia) Narromine	Standard	(Australia) Matthew Scutter	Schempp-Hirth Discus-2a	
2015	(Australia) Narromine	Club	(United Kingdom) Tom Arscott	Schempp-Hirth Standard Cirrus	
2017	(Lithuania) Pociūnai	Standard	(Netherlands) Sjoerd van Empelen	Rolladen-Schneider LS8	
2017	(Lithuania) Pociūnai	Club	(Germany) Julian Klemm	Glasflügel Standard Libelle	
2019	(Hungary) Szeged	Standard	(Germany) Simon Schröder	Rolladen-Schneider LS8	
2019	(Hungary) Szeged	Club	(United Kingdom) Jake Brattle	Schleicher ASW 20	
2022	(Czech Republic) Tábor	Standard	(Germany) Simon Briel	Schempp-Hirth Discus-2a	
2022	(Czech Republic) Tábor	Club	(United Kingdom) Finn Sleigh	Schleicher ASW 20	
2024	(Poland) Ostrów Wielkopolski	Standard	(Germany) Max Maslak	Rolladen-Schneider LS8	
2024	(Poland) Ostrów Wielkopolski	Club	(Belgium) Martijn Eerdekens	Rolladen-Schneider LS3	
2026	(Germany) Aalen-Elchingen	Standard	(Germany) Max Maslak	Rolladen-Schneider LS8neo	
2026	(Germany) Aalen-Elchingen	Club	(Australia) Max Scutchings	Schleicher ASW 20	

== FAI World Glider Aerobatic Championships ==
World Glider Aerobatic Championships take place each year (every two years until 2011) since 1985 under the auspices of the FAI. They are administrated by the FAI Aerobatics Commission "Commission Internationale de Voltige Aerienne" (CIVA). The 2001 championships were part of the World Air Games. Since 1994, European Glider Aerobatic Championships are held in the years between the World Championships. Since 2010, an additional event is organized in a slightly less demanding "Advanced" category – the World Advanced Glider Aerobatic Championships (WAGAC). WAGAC is organized yearly, usually accompanying the WGAC.

- 1st FAI World Glider Aerobatic Championships, Mauterndorf, Austria, 26 August – 3 September 1985
  - individual results:
    1. Jerzy Makula (Poland) glider: Kobuz 3
    2. Ludwig Fuß (Federal Republic of Germany), glider: Lo 100
    3. Marek Szufa (Poland) glider: Kobuz 3
  - team winners:
    1. Polish People's Republic: Jerzy Makula (Kobuz 3), Marek Szufa (Kobuz 3), Marian Bednorz
    2. Federal Republic of Germany: Ludwig Fuß (Lo 100), Helmut Laurson (Lo 100a), Josef Eberl (Lo 100)
    3. Austria: Siegfried Duchkowitsch, Reinhard Haggenmüller, Otto Salzinger
- 2nd FAI World Glider Aerobatic Championships, Bielsko-Biała, Poland, 1–15 August 1987
  - individual results:
    1. Jerzy Makula (Poland), glider: Kobuz 3
    2. Andrzej Tomkowicz (Poland), glider: Kobuz 3
    3. Nancy Blank (United States of America) glider: Kobuz 3
  - team winners:
    1. Polish People's Republic: Jerzy Makula (Kobuz 3), Andrzej Tomkowicz (Kobuz 3), ...
    2. Federal Republic of Germany
    3. Austria
- 3rd FAI World Glider Aerobatic Championships, Hockenheim, Federal Republic of Germany, 15–26 August 1989
  - individual results:
    1. Jerzy Makula (Poland), glider: Kobuz 3
    2. Andrzej Jozef Solski (Poland), glider: Kobuz 3
    3. Hubert Jänsch (Federal Republic of Germany), glider: Lo 100
  - team winners:
    1. Poland: Jerzy Makula (Kobuz 3), Jozef Solski (Kobuz 3), ...
    2. Federal Republic of Germany: Hubert Jänsch (Lo 100), ...
    3. Switzerland: Walter Martig (LO 100), Peter Gafner (LO 100), Franz Studer (LO 100)
- 4th FAI World Glider Aerobatic Championships, Zielona Góra, Poland, 18–31 August 1991
  - individual results:
    1. Jerzy Makula (Poland), glider: Swift S-1
    2. Tadeusz Mezyk (Poland), glider: Swift S-1
    3. Marek Hernik (Poland), glider: Swift S-1
  - team winners:
    1. Poland: Jerzy Makula (Swift S-1), Tadeusz Mezyk (Swift S-1), Marek Hernik (Swift S-1)
    2. Germany: Martin Scheuermann (Mü 28), Hubert Jänsch (Lo 100), Konrad Huber (Lo 100)
    3. United States of America: Stephen Coan (Windex 1200), Charles Kalko (Celstar GA-1), Chris Smisson (Celstar GA-1)
- 5th FAI World Glider Aerobatic Championships, Venlo, the Netherlands, 15–28 August 1993
  - individual results:
    1. Jerzy Makula (Poland)
    2. Adam Michałowski (Poland)
    3. Tadeusz Mezyk (Poland)
  - team winners:
    1. Poland: Jerzy Makula, Adam Michałowski, Tadeusz Mezyk
    2. France: Sándor Katona, Pierre Albertini, Daniel Serres
    3. Germany: Hubert Jänsch, Ulf Kramer, Henry Bohlig
- 6th FAI World Glider Aerobatic Championships, Fayence, Var, France, 11–23 September 1995
  - individual results:
    1. Mikhail Mamistov (Russia), glider: Swift S-1
    2. Jerzy Makula (Poland), glider: MDM-1 Fox
    3. Sergey Rakhmanin (Russia), glider: Swift S-1
  - team winners:
    1. Russia: Mikhail Mamistov (Swift S-1), Sergey Rakhmanin (Swift S-1), Victor Tchmal (Swift S-1)
    2. Poland: Jerzy Makula (MDM-1 Fox), Andrzej Tomkowicz (Swift S-1), Marek Hernik (MDM-1 Fox)
    3. France: Daniel Serres (Swift S-1), Etienne Meyrous (Swift S-1), Pierre Albertini (Swift S-1)
- 7th FAI World Glider Aerobatic Championships, Antalya, Turkey, 9–21 September 1997
  - individual results:
    1. Mikhail Mamistov (Russia)
    2. Sergei Krikalev (Russia) – cosmonaut
    3. Georgij Kaminski (Russia)
  - team winners:
    1. Russia: Mikhail Mamistov, Sergei Krikalev, Georgij Kaminski
- 8th FAI World Glider Aerobatic Championships, Niederöblarn, Austria, 15–28 August 1999
  - individual results:
    1. Jerzy Makula (Poland), glider: MDM-1 Fox
    2. Henry Bohlig (Germany), glider: Swift S-1
    3. Krzystof Brzakalik (Poland), glider: Swift S-1
  - team winners:
    1. Poland: Jerzy Makula (MDM-1 Fox), Krzysztof Brząkalik (Swift S-1), Adam Michałowski (Swift S-1)
    2. Germany: Henry Bohlig (Swift S-1), Helmut Lindner (Swift S-1), Detlef Eilers (Swift S-1)
    3. Russia: Valentin Barabanov (Swift S-1), Georgij Kaminski (Swift S-1), Alexandr Panfierov (Swift S-1)
- 9th FAI World Glider Aerobatic Championships and 2nd World Air Games Glider Aerobatics Championships, Palma del Río, Córdoba, Spain, 19 June – 1 July 2001
  - individual results:
    1. Alexandr Panfierov (Russia)
    2. Jerzy Makula (Poland)
    3. Adam Michałowski (Poland)
  - team winners:
    1. Poland: Jerzy Makula, Adam Michałowski, Małgorzata Margańska
    2. Russia: Alexandr Panfierov, Valentin Barabanov, Georgij Kaminski
    3. Hungary: Ferenc Tóth, János Szilágyi, Sándor Katona
- 10th FAI World Glider Aerobatic Championships, Pér, Hungary, 2–15 August 2003
  - individual results:
    1. Ferenc Tóth (Hungary), glider: Swift S-1
    2. Jerzy Makula (Poland), glider: MDM-1 Fox
    3. Georgij Kaminski (Russia), glider: Swift S-1
  - team winners:
    1. Poland: Jerzy Makula (MDM-1 Fox), Krzysztof Brząkalik (Swift S-1), Lucjan Fizia (Swift S-1)
    2. Russia: Georgij Kaminski (Swift S-1), Alexandr Panfierov (Swift S-1), Alexandr Smirnov (Swift S-1)
    3. Hungary: Ferenc Tóth (Swift S-1), Sándor Katona (Swift S-1), János Szilágyi (Swift S-1)
- 11th FAI World Glider Aerobatic Championships, Serpuchov, Russia, 20–30 July 2005
  - individual results:
    1. Georgij Kaminski (Russia)
    2. Jerzy Makula (Poland)
    3. Ferenc Tóth (Hungary)
  - team winners:
    1. Russia: Georgij Kaminski, Alexandr Panfierov, Valentin Barabanov
    2. Poland: Jerzy Makula, Krzysztof Brząkalik, Stanisław Makula
    3. Hungary: Ferenc Tóth, János Szilágyi, Sándor Katona
- 12th FAI World Glider Aerobatic Championships, Niederöblarn, Austria, 16–25 August 2007
  - individual results:
    1. Georgij Kaminski (Russia), glider: Swift S-1
    2. Ferenc Tóth (Hungary), glider: Swift S-1
    3. Jerzy Makula (Poland), glider: Solo-Fox
  - team winners:
    1. Hungary: Ferenc Tóth (Swift S-1), János Szilágyi (Swift S-1), Zoltán Kakuk (Swift S-1)
    2. Germany: Olaf Schmidt (Swift S-1), Markus Feyerabend (Swift S-1), Eugen Schaal (MDM-1 Fox)
    3. Russia: Georgij Kaminski (Swift S-1), Igor Plakhsin (Swift S-1), Olga Romanenko (Swift S-1)
- 13th FAI World Glider Aerobatic Championships, Hosín, Czech Republic, 10 July 2009 – 19 July 2009
  - individual results:
    1. Georgij Kaminski (Russia), glider: Swift S-1
    2. Erik Piriou (France), glider: Swift S-1
    3. Jan Rozlivka (Czech Republic), glider: Swift S-1
  - team winners:
    1. France: Erik Piriou (Swift S-1), Daniel Serres (Swift S-1), Jean-Christophe Beaumier (Swift S-1)
    2. Czech Republic: Jan Rozlivka (Swift S-1), Přemysl Vávra (Swift S-1), Miroslav Červenka (Swift S-1)
    3. Germany: Eugen Schaal (MDM-1 Fox), Olaf Schmidt (Swift S-1), Gerhard Teichmann (Swift S-1)
- 1st FAI World Advanced Glider Aerobatic Championships, Jämijärvi, Finland, 17–24 July 2010.
  - individual results:
    1. Johan Gustafsson (Sweden), glider: Pilatus B-4
    2. Michael Spitzer (Germany), glider: MDM-1 Fox
    3. Jochen Reuter (Germany), glider: MDM-1 Fox
  - team winners:
    1. Germany: Michael Spitzer (MDM-1 Fox), Jochen Reuter (MDM-1 Fox), Sebastian Dirlam (MDM-1 Fox)
    2. Sweden: Johan Gustafsson (Pilatus B4), Daniel Ahlin (MDM-1 Fox), Pekka Havbrandt (MDM-1 Fox)
    3. Czech Republic: Petr Biskup (MDM-1 Fox), Miloš Ramert (MDM-1 Fox), Jan Rolinek (MDM-1 Fox)
- 14th FAI World Glider Aerobatic Championships (Unlimited) and 2nd FAI World Advanced Glider Aerobatic Championships (Advanced), Toruń, Poland, 26 July 2011 – 7 August 2011
  - Unlimited category
    - individual results:
      1. Jerzy Makula (Poland), glider: Solo-Fox
      2. Georgij Kaminski (Russia), glider: Swift S-1
      3. Erik Piriou (France), glider: Swift S-1
    - team winners:
      1. Poland: Jerzy Makula (Solo-Fox), Maciej Pospieszyński (Swift S-1), Stanisław Makula (Solo-Fox)
      2. France: Erik Piriou (Swift S-1), Daniel Serres (Swift S-1), Pierre Albertini (Swift S-1)
      3. Russia: Georgij Kaminski (Swift S-1), Vladimir Ilinski (Swift S-1), Igor Plaksin (Swift S-1)
  - Advanced category
    - individual results:
      1. Benoit Merieau (France), glider: Swift S-1
      2. Luca Bertossio (Italy), glider: Swift S-1
      3. Aurelien Durgineux (France), glider: Swift S-1
    - team winners:
      1. Germany: David Friedrich (Swift S-1), Jochen Reuter (MDM-1 Fox), Michael Spitzer (MDM-1 Fox)
      2. France: Benoit Merieau (Swift S-1), Aurelien Durgineux (Swift S-1), Daniel Devillers (Swift S-1)
      3. Sweden: Daniel Ahlin (MDM-1 Fox), Johan Gustafsson (Pilatus B-4), Pekka Havbrandt (MDM-1 Fox)
- 15th FAI World Glider Aerobatic Championships (Unlimited) and 3rd FAI World Advanced Glider Aerobatic Championships (Advanced), Dubnica, Slovakia, 9 August 2012 – 18 August 2012
  - Unlimited category
    - individual results:
      1. Poland: Maciej Pospieszyński, glider: Swift S-1
      2. Hungary: Ferenc Tóth, glider: Swift S-1
      3. Germany: Markus Feyerabend, glider: Swift S-1
  - Advanced category
    - individual results:
      1. Italy: Luca Bertossio, glider: Swift S-1
      2. Italy: Marcello Tedeschi, glider: Swift S-1
      3. Italy: Sasa Marvin, glider: Swift S-1
    - team results:
      1. Italy: Luca Bertossio (Swift S-1), Marcello Tedeschi (Swift S-1), Sasa Marvin (Swift S-1)
      2. Germany: Nicolas Soehner (MDM-1 Fox), Eberhard Holl (MDM-1 Fox), Dirk Maslonka (MDM-1 Fox)
      3. Poland: Magdalena Stróżyk (Solo Fox), Katarzyna Żmudzińska (MDM-1 Fox), Sławomir Talowski (Swift S-1)
- 16th FAI World Glider Aerobatic Championships (Unlimited) and 4th World Advanced Glider Aerobatic Championships (Advanced), Oripää Airfield, Oripää, Finland, 18–27 July 2013
  - Unlimited category
    - individual results:
      1. Russia: Vladmir Ilyinski, glider: Swift S-1
      2. Russia: Georgij Kaminski, glider: Swift S-1
      3. Poland: Maciej Pospieszyński, glider: Swift S-1
    - team winners:
      1. Czech Republic
      2. Germany
      3. Poland
  - Advanced category
    - individual results:
      1. Sweden: Johan Gustafsson, glider: SZD-59 Acro
      2. Poland: Sławomir Talowski, glider: Swift S-1
      3. Sweden: Daniel Ahlin, glider: Salto
    - team results:
      1. Poland: Sławomir Talowski (Swift S-1), Katarzyna Żmudzinska (Swift S-1), Magdalena Stróżyk (Swift S-1)
      2. Czech Republic: Michal Čechmánek (Swift S-1), Ivo Červinka (Swift S-1), Jan Rolinek (Swift S-1)
      3. Italy: Sasha Marvin (Swift S-1), Pietro Filippini (Swift S-1), Lapo Simone Dressino (Swift S-1)
- 17th FAI World Glider Aerobatic Championships (Unlimited category) and 5th World Advanced Glider Aerobatic Championships (Advanced category) Toruń Airfield, Toruń, Poland, July 22 – August 2, 2014.
  - Unlimited category
    - individual results:
      1. Poland: Maciej Pospieszyński, glider: Swift S-1
      2. Hungary: Ferenc Tóth, glider: Swift S-1
      3. Russia: Georgij Kaminski, glider: Swift S-1
    - team winners:
      1. Czech Republic: Přemysl Vávra, Jan Rozlivka, Jan Rolinek
      2. Poland: Maciej Pospieszyński, Jerzy Makula, Tomasz Kaczmarczyk
      3. Russia: Georgy Kaminskiy, Valeriy Korchagin, Vladimir Ilinskiy
  - Advanced category
    - individual results:
      1. France: Romain Vienne, glider: Swift S-1
      2. Poland: Katarzyna Żmudzińska, glider: Swift S-1
      3. Poland: Sławomir Talowski, glider: Swift S-1
    - team results:
      1. Poland: Katarzyna Żmudzinska, Sławomir Talowski, Michał Klimaszewski
      2. France: Romain Vienne, Benoit Madrenas, Ervin George
      3. Germany: Markus Pönicke, Andreas Rodewald, Eberhard Holl
- 18th FAI World Glider Aerobatic Championships (Unlimited category) and 6th World Advanced Glider Aerobatic Championships (Advanced category), August 5–15, 2015, Zbraslavice Airport, Czech Republic.
  - Unlimited category
    - individual results:
      1. Hungary: Ferenc Tóth, glider: Swift S-1
      2. Italy: Luca Bertossio, glider: Swift S-1
      3. Germany: Eugen Schaal, glider: Swift S-1
    - team winners:
      1. Czech Republic: Přemysl Vávra, Miroslav Červenka, Lucie Pešková
      2. Germany: Eugen Schaal, Markus Feyerabend, Gisbert Leimkühler
      3. Poland: Maciej Pospieszyński, Jerzy Makula, Magdalene Stróžyk
  - Advanced category
    - individual results:
      1. Czech Republic: Miroslav Černý, glider: Swift S-1
      2. Poland: Sławomir Talowski, glider: Swift S-1
      3. Switzerland: Jonas Langenegger, glider: MDM-1 Fox
    - team results:
      1. Poland: Sławomir Talowski, Katarzyna Zmudziňska, Michał Andrzejewski
      2. Czech Republic: Miroslav Černý, David Beneš, Martin Meloun
      3. Switzerland: Jonas Langenegger, Manfred Echter, Martin Götz
- 20th FAI World Glider Aerobatic Championships (Unlimited category) and 8th World Advanced Glider Aerobatic Championships (Advanced category), July 27 – August 5, 2017, Toruń, Poland.
  - Unlimited category
    - individual results:
      1. Hungary: Ferenc Tóth, glider: Swift S-1
      2. Hungary: János Szilágyi, glider: Swift S-1
      3. Italy: Luca Bertossio, glider: Swift S-1
    - team winners:
      1. Hungary: Ferenc Tóth, János Szilágyi, János Sonkoly
      2. Germany: Moritz Kirchberg, Eugen Schaal, Marvin Woltering
      3. Austria: Siegfried Mayr, Gabriel Stangl, Bernhard Behr
  - Advanced category
    - individual results:
      1. Sweden: Gustav Salminen, glider: MDM-1 Fox
      2. France: Erwin George, glider: Swift S-1
      3. Poland: Michał Klimaszewski, glider: MDM-1 Fox
    - team results:
      1. Poland: Michał Andrzejewski, Agata Nykaza, Mirosław Wrześniewski
      2. France: Erwin George, Benoît Madrenas, Eric Lanquetin
      3. Romania: Ciprian Lupaș, Valentin Hota, Gál Zsolt
- 21st FAI World Glider Aerobatic Championships (Unlimited category) and 9th World Advanced Glider Aerobatic Championships (Advanced category), August 1 – 11, 2018, Zbraslavice Airport, Czech Republic.
  - Unlimited category
    - individual results:
      1. Hungary: Ferenc Tóth, glider: Swift S-1
      2. Italy: Luca Bertossio, glider: Swift S-1
      3. Germany: Moritz Kirchberg, glider: Swift S-1
    - team winners:
      1. Germany: Moritz Kirchberg, Eugen Schaal, Eberhard Holl
      2. Hungary: Ferenc Tóth, János Szilágyi, János Sonkoly
      3. Czech Republic: Přemysl Vávra, Miroslav Červenka, Miroslav Černý
  - Advanced category
    - individual results:
      1. Switzerland: Jonas Langenegger, glider: MDM-1 Fox
      2. Czech Republic: Tomáš Bartoň, glider: Swift S-1
      3. Czech Republic: Josef Rejent, glider: Swift S-1
    - team results:
      1. Czech Republic: Tomáš Bartoň, Josef Rejent, Aleš Ferra
      2. Poland: Michał Klimaszewski, Sławomir Cichoń, Wojciech Gałuszka
      3. Romania: Lorand Daroczi, Octav Alexan, Ciprian Lupaș
- 22nd FAI World Glider Aerobatic Championships (Unlimited category) and 10th World Advanced Glider Aerobatic Championships (Advanced category), July 18–26, 2019, Deva, Romania.
  - Unlimited category
    - individual results:
      1. Hungary: Ferenc Tóth, glider: Swift S-1
      2. Germany: Eugen Schaal, glider: Swift S-1
      3. Germany: Michael Spitzer, glider: Swift S-1
    - team winners:
      1. Germany: Eugen Schaal, Michael Spitzer, Tobias Hackel
      2. Poland: Stanisław Makula, Jan Makula, Piotr Lewandowski
      3. Austria: Bernhard Behr, Siegfried Mayr, Gabriel Stangl
  - Advanced category
    - individual results:
      1. Poland: Patrycja Pacak, glider: Swift S-1
      2. Romania: Octav Alexan, glider: MDM-1 Fox
      3. France: Charlie Levy-Louapre, glider: MDM-1 Fox
    - team results:
      1. Romania: Octav Alexan, Lorand Daroczi, Ciprian Lupaș
      2. France: Charlie Levy-Louapre, Thibaut Fromantin, Marc de Bouvier
      3. Germany: Stefan Zistler, Mathias Mühlbacher, David Tempel
- 23rd FAI World Glider Aerobatic Championships (Unlimited category) and 11th World Advanced Glider Aerobatic Championships (Advanced category), July 29–August 6, 2021, Leszno, Poland.
  - Unlimited category
    - individual results:
      1. Hungary: Ferenc Tóth, glider: Swift S-1
      2. Italy: Luca Bertossio, glider: Swift S-1
      3. Russia: Vladimir Ilinskiy, glider: Swift S-1
    - team winners:
      1. Poland: Piotr Lewandowski, Jan Makula, Stanisław Makula
      2. France: Benoît Madrenas, Nicolas Honnons, Marc de Bouvier
      3. Austria: Siegfried Mayr, Bernhard Behr, Jakob Prior
  - Advanced category
    - individual results:
      1. France: Charlie Levy-Louapre, glider: Swift S-1
      2. Russia: Maria Gavrilina, glider: Swift S-1
      3. France: Thibaut Fromantin, glider: Swift S-1
    - team results:
      1. Romania: Octav Alexan, Valentin Hoța, Daroczi Lorand
      2. France: Charlie Levy-Louapre, Thibaut Fromantin, Frédéric Durand
      3. Poland: Sławomir Cichoń, Wojciech Gałuszka, Michał Rumiński
- 24th FAI World Glider Aerobatic Championships (Unlimited category) and 12th World Advanced Glider Aerobatic Championships (Advanced category), 18–26 August, 2022, Issoudun, France.
  - Unlimited category
    - individual results:
      1. Hungary: Ferenc Tóth, glider: Swift S-1
      2. Poland: Maciej Pospieszyński, glider: Swift S-1
      3. Switzerland: Jonas Langenegger, glider: Swift S-1
    - team winners:
      1. France: Charlie Levy-Louapre, Marc de Bouvier
      2. Poland: Maciej Pospieszyński, Michał Klimaszewski
      3. Germany: Michael Spitzer, Wolfgang Schiek
  - Advanced category
    - individual results:
      1. Czech Republic: Oliver Adamy, glider: Swift S-1
      2. France: Thibaut Fromantin, glider: Swift S-1
      3. Poland: Mirosław Wrześniewski, glider: Swift S-1
    - team results:
      1. Czech Republic: Oliver Adamy, Adam Klenka, Jan Adam
      2. Germany: Mathias Mühlbacher, Holger Geusen, David Tempel
      3. Romania: Valentin Hoța, Zsolt Gál, Lorand Daroczi
- 25th FAI World Glider Aerobatic Championships (Unlimited category) and 13th World Advanced Glider Aerobatic Championships (Advanced category), 27 July – 5 August, 2023, Toruń, Poland.
  - Unlimited category
    - individual results:
      1. Poland: Maciej Pospieszyński, glider: Swift S-1
      2. France: Charlie Levy-Louapre, glider: Swift S-1
      3. Austria: Siegfried Mayr, glider: Swift S-1
    - team winners:
      1. Poland: Maciej Pospieszyński, Mirosław Wrześniewski
      2. Germany: Wolfgang Schiek, Michael Spitzer
      3. France: Charlie Levy-Louapre, Marc de Bouvier
  - Advanced category
    - individual results:
      1. France: Thibaut Fromantin, glider: Swift S-1
      2. Poland: Agata Porębska, glider: Swift S-1
      3. Czech Republic: Tomáš Michálek, glider: Swift S-1
    - team results:
      1. Czech Republic: Tomáš Michálek, Jan Adam, Marek Veselý
      2. Germany: Richard Münzberger, David Tempel, Lars Czernek
      3. Poland: Agata Porębska, Paweł Mazur, Piotr Sieradzan
- 26th FAI World Glider Aerobatic Championships (Unlimited category) and 14th World Advanced Glider Aerobatic Championships (Advanced category), 1 – 10 August, 2024, Oschatz, Germany.
  - Unlimited category
    - individual results:
      1. Poland: Maciej Pospieszyński, glider: Swift S-1
      2. Switzerland: Jonas Langenegger, glider: Swift S-1
      3. Germany: Moritz Kirchberg, glider: Swift S-1
    - team winners:
      1. Germany: Moritz Kirchberg, Wolfgang Schieck, Michael Spitzer
      2. Poland: Maciej Pospieszyński, Michał Klimaszewski, Mirosław Wrześniewski
      3. Czech Republic: Přemysl Vávra, Miroslav Červenka, Oliver Adamy
  - Advanced category
    - individual results:
      1. Netherlands: Lars Hofman, glider: MDM-1 Fox
      2. France: Maximilian Godard, glider: Swift S-1
      3. Czech Republic: Marek Veselý, glider: Swift S-1
    - team results:
      1. Netherlands: Lars Hofman, Björn Straijer, Jelle Heikamp
      2. Czech Republic: Marek Veselý, Adam Klenka, Vilém Říha
      3. Romania: Zsolt Gál, Valentin Hota, Lazăr Geza-Lehel
- 27th FAI World Glider Aerobatic Championships (Unlimited category) and 15th World Advanced Glider Aerobatic Championships (Advanced category), 3 – 11 September, 2026, Fayence, France.
  - Unlimited category
    - individual results:
      1. Czech Republic: Oliver Adamy, glider: Swift S-1
      2. Germany: Michael Spitzer, glider: Swift S-1
      3. Poland: Maciej Pospieszyński, glider: Swift S-1
    - team winners:
      1. Czech Republic: Oliver Adamy, Miroslav Černý
      2. Germany: Michael Spitzer, Steffen Engel
      3. Poland: Maciej Pospieszyński, Michał Klimaszewski
  - Advanced category
    - individual results:
      1. Germany: Tobias Ohlig, glider: Swift S-1
      2. Germany: Nick Charly Weiss, glider: PZL SZD-59
      3. Germany: Stefan Zistler, glider: MDM-1 Fox
    - team results:
      1. Germany: Tobias Ohlig, Nick Charly Weiss, Stefan Zistler
      2. Poland: Paweł Mazur, Igor Cyberski, Agata Porębska
      3. Great Britain: Elliot Cox, Alex Phillips, Daniel Weston

== See also ==
- European Gliding Championships

== Sources ==
- Airsports.tv Gliding Channel
- Air Sports International (FAI online magazine)
- Archive of the US Team
- British Gliding Association competitions page
