= Maciej Pospieszyński =

Polish glider aerobatic pilot

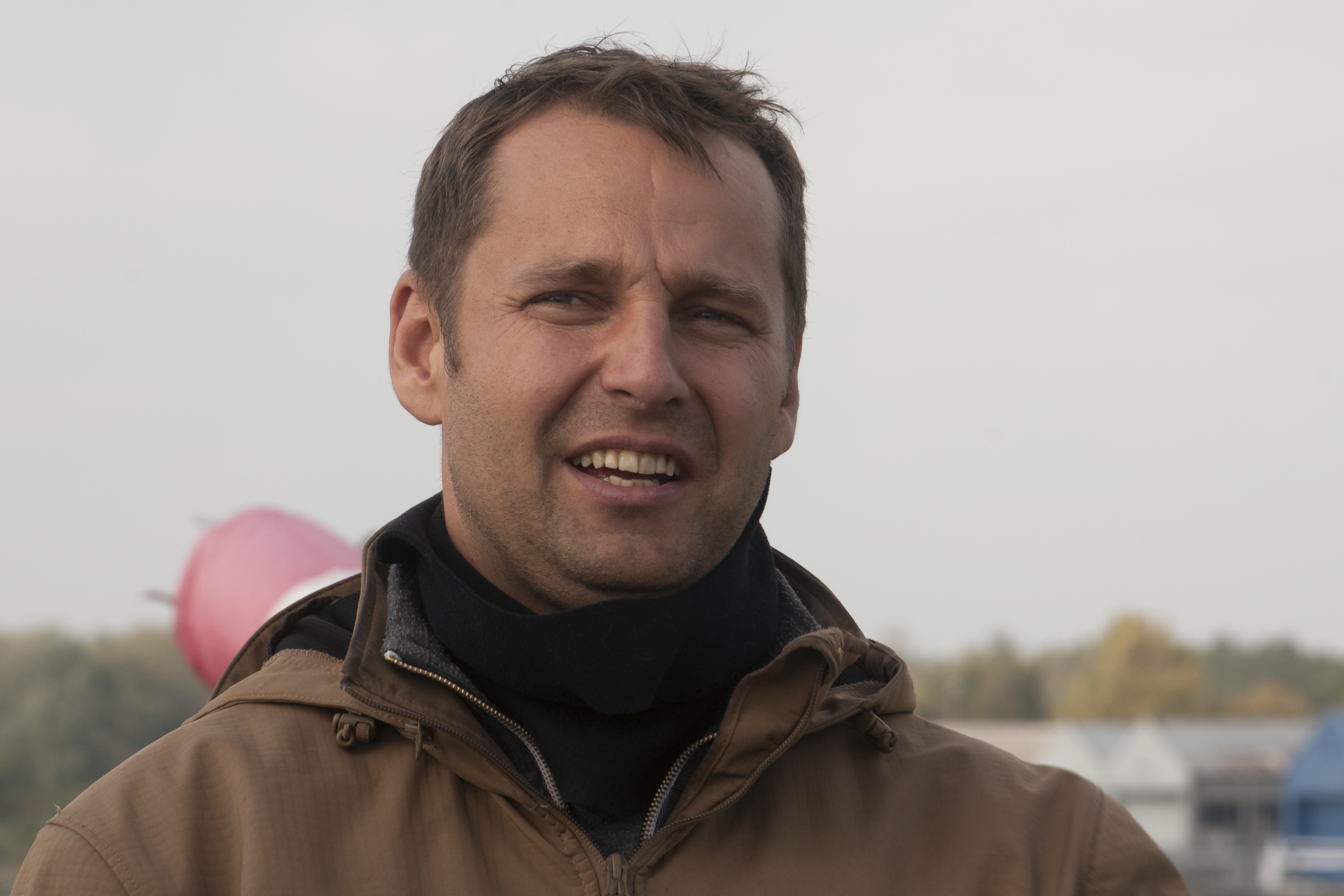
Pospieszyński in 2019

Maciej Pospieszyński (born 1981) – is a Polish glider aerobatic pilot and a powered aerobatic pilot.

Achievements in top glider aerobatic competitions
year	contest	location	category	ranking	team ranking
2010	FAI European Championships	Jami, Finland	Unlimited	4	3 (Jerzy Makula-Stanislaw Makula-Maciej Pospieszyński)
2011	FAI World Championships	Toruń, Poland	Unlimited	6	1 (Jerzy Makula-Stanislaw Makula-Maciej Pospieszyński)
2012	FAI World Championships	Dubnica, Slovakia	Unlimited	1	n/a
2013	FAI World Championships	Oripaa, Finland	Unlimited	3	3 (Jerzy Makula-Stanislaw Makula-Maciej Pospieszyński)
2014	FAI World Championships	Toruń, Poland	Unlimited	1	2 (Maciej Pospieszyński, Jerzy Makula, Tomasz Kaczmarczyk
