= Alexandr Panfierov =

Russian glider aerobatic pilot

Alexandr Panfierov is a Russian glider aerobatic pilot who won the FAI World Glider Aerobatic Championships and World Air Games Glider Aerobatics Championships 2001.
