= Jerzy Makula =

Polish pilot (born 1952)

- Born: 29 September 1952 (age 74); Ruda Śląska

Jerzy Makula (born 29 September 1952 in Ruda Śląska) is a Polish pilot who won the FAI World Glider Aerobatic Championships seven times.

== Career ==
He was World Glider Aerobatic Champion in 1985, 1987, 1989, 1991, 1993, 1999 and 2011. In 1995, 2001, 2003 and 2005 he was World Vice-Champion. In the World Glider Aerobatic Championships 1997 he was fifth, and in 2007 he won the bronze medal. In 1998 and 2004 he was European Champion. In 1996, 2000 and 2006 he was European Vice-Champion. Additionally, he won Polish National Glider Aerobatic Championships at least 14 times.

He is a member of the aeroclub of ROW Rybnik. In recent contests, he usually flew the "Solo-Fox", which is a conversion of the MDM-1 Fox prototype into a single seater with retractable undercarriage. MDM stands for Margański-Dunowski-Makula.

== Glider aerobatics ==
Achievements in international FAI aerobatic championships (unlimited category)
year	competition	ranking	team ranking	glider/plane
2011	14th FAI World Glider Aerobatic Championships	1	1	Solo Fox
2010	10th FAI European Glider Aerobatic Championships	10	3	Solo Fox
2008	9th FAI European Glider Aerobatic Championships	18		Solo Fox
2007	12th FAI World Glider Aerobatic Championships	3		Solo Fox
2006	8th FAI European Glider Aerobatic Championships	2		MDM-1 Fox
2005	11th FAI World Glider Aerobatic Championships	2	2	
2004	7th FAI European Glider Aerobatic Championships	1		
2003	10th FAI World Glider Aerobatic Championships	2	1	MDM-1 Fox
2002	6th FAI European Glider Aerobatic Championships	-no results-	-no results-	
2001	9th FAI World Glider Aerobatic Championships and 2nd World Air Games	2	1	
2000	5th FAI European Glider Aerobatic Championships	2	1	
1999	8th FAI World Glider Aerobatic Championships	1	1	MDM-1 Fox
1998	4th FAI European Glider Aerobatic Championships	1	1	MDM-1 Fox
1997	7th FAI World Glider Aerobatic Championships	5		
1996	3rd FAI European Glider Aerobatic Championships	2	2	MDM-1 Fox
1995	6th FAI World Glider Aerobatic Championships	2	2	MDM-1 Fox
1993	5th FAI World Glider Aerobatic Championships	1	1	
1991	4th FAI World Glider Aerobatic Championships	1	1	Swift S-1
1989	3rd FAI World Glider Aerobatic Championships	1	1	Kobuz 3
1987	2nd FAI World Glider Aerobatic Championships	1	1	Kobuz 3
1985	1st FAI World Glider Aerobatic Championships	1	1	Kobuz 3
1982	11th FAI World (Powered) Aerobatic Championships	48		Zlin Z-50L

== Awards and movies ==
In 2003 he was awarded the Paul Tissandier Diploma, and in 2005 he was awarded the Centenary Medal of the Fédération Aéronautique Internationale. Additionally, he was awarded the Phoenix Sariensis in 2005.

There are two documentary films with and about Jerzy Makula: Wniebowzięty by Ewa Świecińska (2000) and W chmurach by Maciej Starczewski (2002).

== Occupation and offices ==
He works as a Boeing 787 captain at Polskie Linie Lotnicze.

For many years he has been Vice-President of the Aero Club of Poland and Polish FAI Aerobatic Commission delegate (Commission Internationale de Voltige Aerienne, CIVA). He is chairman of the CIVA Glider Aerobatics Sub-Committee. Besides, he is a glider aerobatics trainer and accredited as a judge in international glider and power aerobatic championships.

== Relatives ==
He is a nephew of Edward Makula.

His sons Stanisław and Mikolaj Makula fly glider aerobatics, too.
