= Ferenc Tóth (pilot) =

Hungarian glider aerobatic pilot

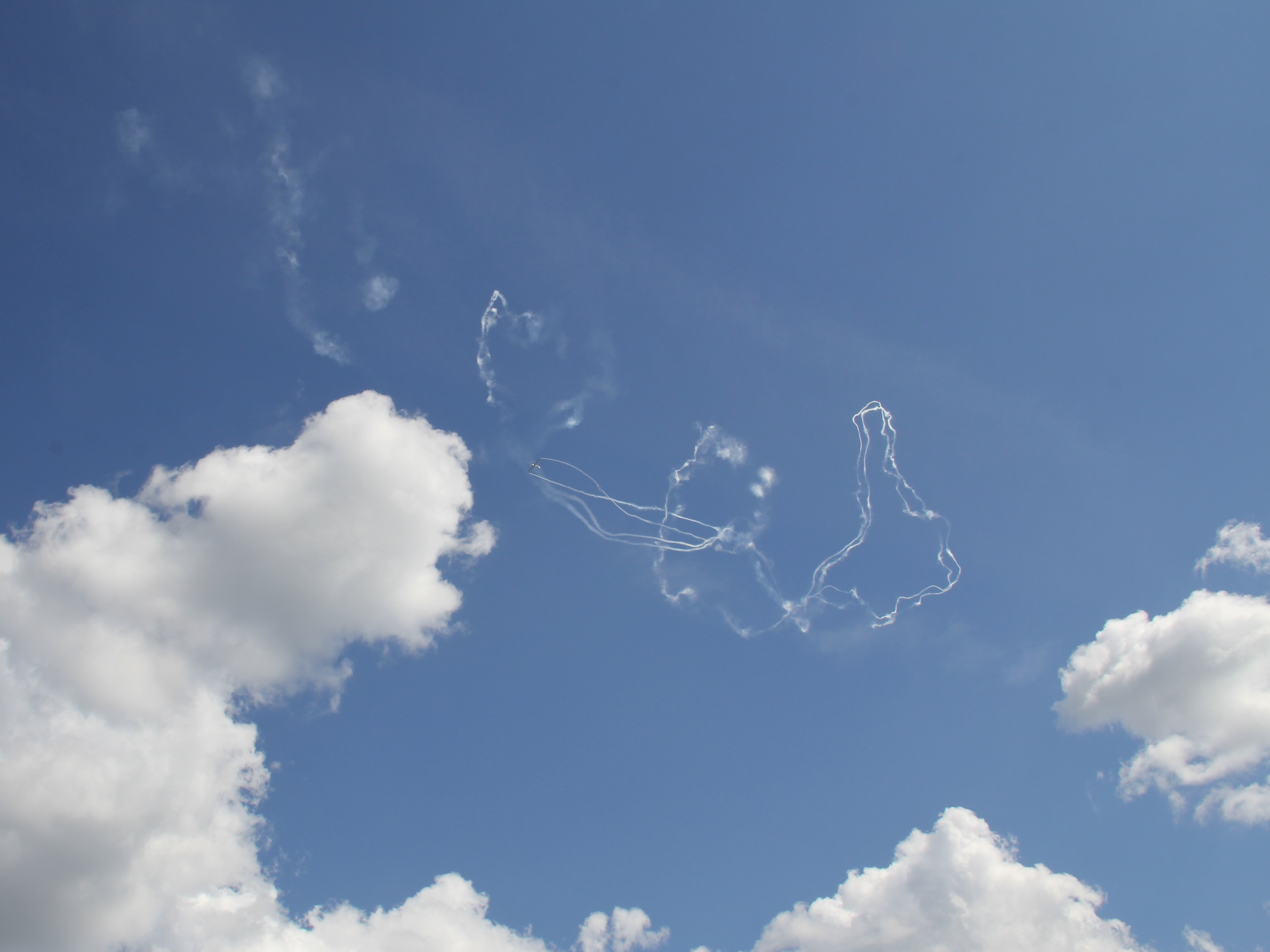
Tóth performing aerobatics above Oripää Airfield in Oripää Airshow 2013 with Swift S-1 glider

Ferenc Tóth is a Hungarian glider aerobatic pilot who won the FAI European Glider Aerobatic Championships 2000, 2006 and 2008, and the FAI World Glider Aerobatic Championships 2003. Furthermore, he won a gold medal at the 2017 World Games in Wrocław, Poland.

He is also a pilot for Hungarian airline Wizz Air.
