= Sándor Katona =

Hungarian glider aerobatic pilot

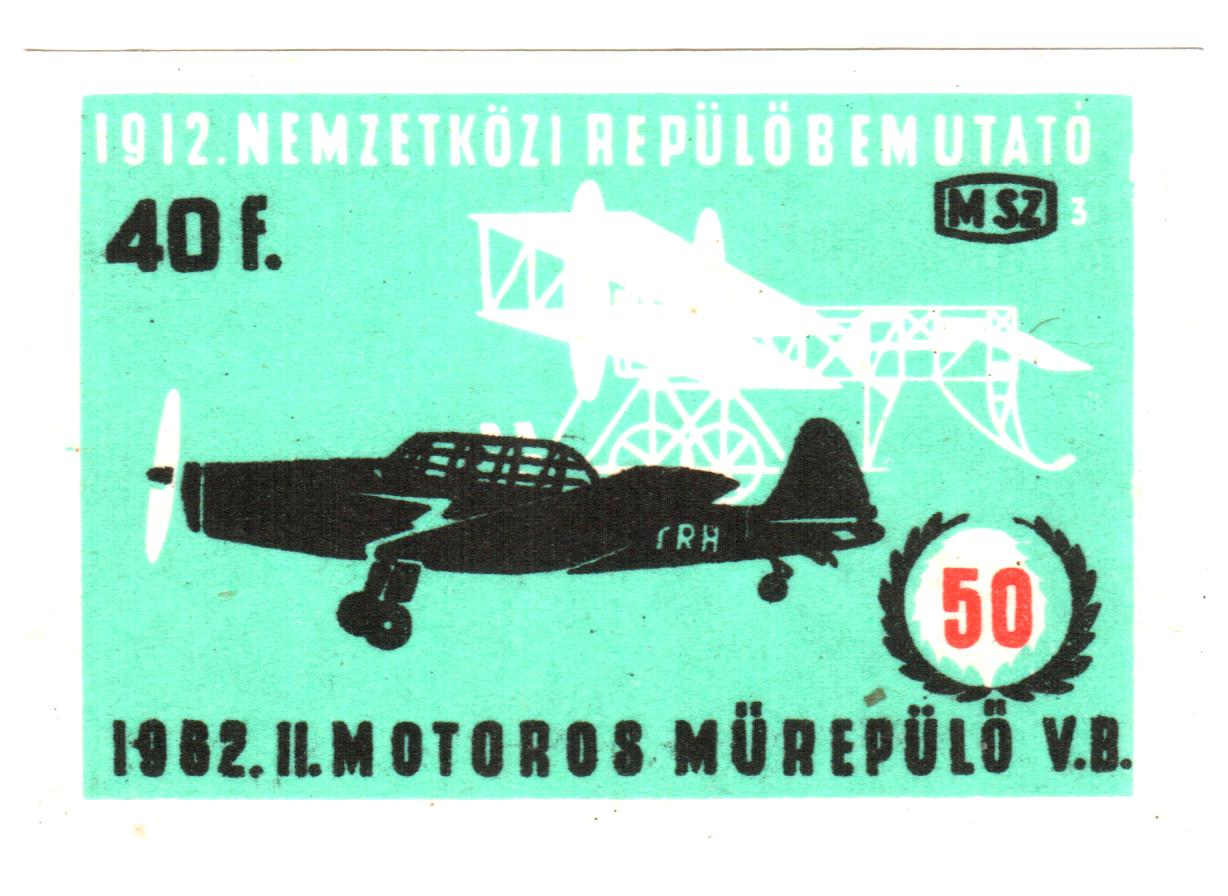

Sándor Katona is a Hungarian glider aerobatic pilot.

He is a professional aerobatics instructor and competed in most World and European Glider Aerobatic Championships. The Fédération Aéronautique Internationale (FAI) awarded him the Paul Tissandier Diploma in 1992, and the Léon Biancotto Aerobatics Diploma in 2006.

Accomplishments in FAI aerobatic championships
year	competition	ranking	team ranking	glider/plane
2008	9th FAI European Glider Aerobatic Championships	32		Swift S-1
2007	12th FAI World Glider Aerobatic Championships	19		Swift S-1
2006	8th FAI European Glider Aerobatic Championships	22		Swift S-1
2005	11th FAI World Glider Aerobatic Championships	13	3 (Hungary)	
2004	7th FAI European Glider Aerobatic Championships	14		
2003	10th FAI World Glider Aerobatic Championships	15	3 (Hungary)	Swift S-1
2001	9th FAI World Glider Aerobatic Championships & 2nd World Air Games Glider Aerobatics Championships	25		
2000	5th FAI European Glider Aerobatic Championships	17		
1999	8th FAI World Glider Aerobatic Championships	4		Swift S-1
1998	4th FAI European Glider Aerobatic Championships	13		Swift S-1
1997	7th FAI World Glider Aerobatic Championships	8		
1996	3rd FAI European Glider Aerobatic Championships	18		Swift S-1
1995	6th FAI World Glider Aerobatic Championships	11		Swift S-1
1993	5th FAI World Glider Aerobatic Championships	8	2 (France)	
1991	4th FAI World Glider Aerobatic Championships	9		Swift S-1
1989	3rd FAI World Glider Aerobatic Championships	13		Akaflieg München Mü28
1987	2nd FAI World Glider Aerobatic Championships	18		Akaflieg München Mü28
1985	1st FAI World Glider Aerobatic Championships	14		
1964	3rd FAI World (Powered) Aerobatic Championships	33		Zlin Z-226
1962	2nd FAI World (Powered) Aerobatic Championships	6		Zlin Z-226
