= Stanisław Makula =

Polish sport pilot

Stanisław Makula a Polish glider aerobatic pilot. He took part in several Polish Glider Aerobatic Championships and FAI European and World Championships. Together with his father Jerzy Makula and Krzystof Brzakalik he won the team silver medal in the 11th FAI World Glider Aerobatic Championships in Serpukhov in 2005.

Achievements of Stanisław Makula in international FAI glider aerobatic championships (unlimited category)
year	competition	ranking	team ranking	glider
2011	14th FAI World Glider Aerobatic Championships	15	1	Solo Fox
2010	10th FAI European Glider Aerobatic Championships	20	3	Solo Fox
2009	13th FAI European Glider Aerobatic Championships	22		Solo Fox
2008	9th FAI European Glider Aerobatic Championships	15		Solo Fox
2007	12th FAI World Glider Aerobatic Championships	15		Solo Fox
2006	8th FAI European Glider Aerobatic Championships	26		MDM-1 Fox
2005	11th FAI World Glider Aerobatic Championships	8	2	
2004	7th FAI European Glider Aerobatic Championships	10		
2003	10th FAI World Glider Aerobatic Championships	9		MDM-1 Fox
2001	9th FAI World Glider Aerobatic Championships and 2nd World Air Games Glider Aerobatics Championships	31		
2000	5th FAI European Glider Aerobatic Championships	18		
1999	8th FAI World Glider Aerobatic Championships	21		MDM-1 Fox
