= Zbigniew Nieradka =

Polish glider pilot

Zbigniew Nieradka is a Polish glider pilot (currently the leader in the glider pilot's world ranking maintained by the FAI Gliding Commission), current World Champion in 18m Class (which title he successfully defended at 2012 World Championships).

== Major titles ==
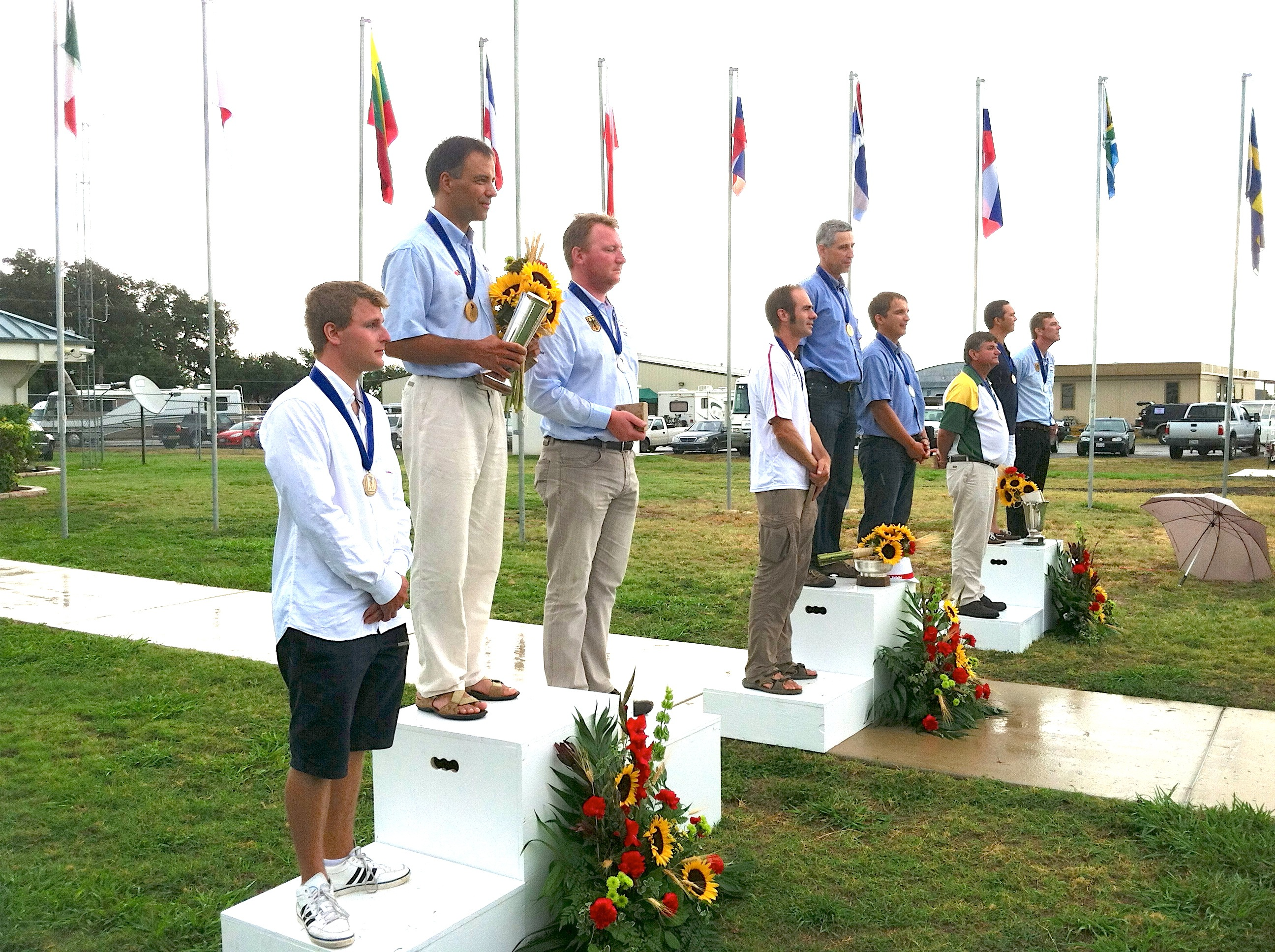
Medal award ceremony, 2012 WGC Uvalde, Texas, Zbigniew Nieradka is the 5th person from the left (gold medal winner in 18m category)

Competition	Venue	Year	Category	Result
World Championships	HUN Szeged	2010	18m Class	Gold
European Championships	LTU Kaunas	2011	18m Class	Silver
World Championships	USA Uvalde	2012	18m Class	Gold

Zbigniew Nieradka had also won Polish National Gliding Championships titles in 2012, 2011, 2007, 2006.
