= SZD-21 Kobuz =

Polish single-seat aerobatic glider, 1961

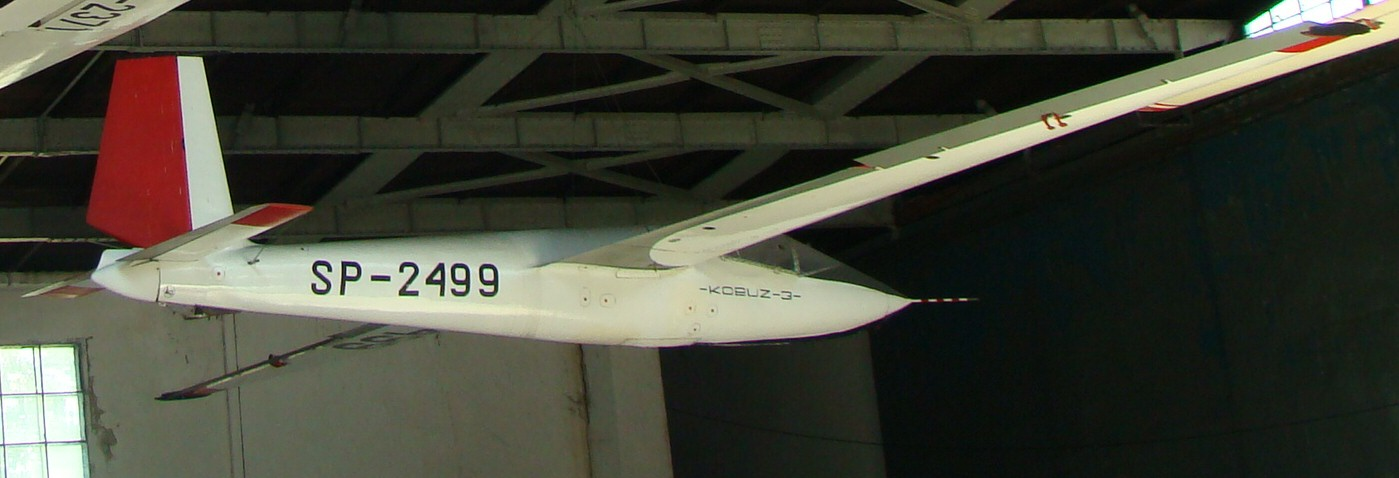
- SZD-21-2B Kobuz 3 in the Polish Aviation Museum

General information
- Type: Glider
- National origin: Poland
- Manufacturer: Glider Works in Wrocław
- Designer: Jerzy Trzeciak, Marian Gracz
- Number built: 30

History
- First flight: 3 June 1961

The SZD-21 Kobuz was a single-seat aerobatic glider designed and built in Poland at Szybowcowy Zakład Doświadczalny (Glider Experimental Works) in Bielsko-Biała from 1958.

== Development ==
The SZD-21 was a successor to the IS-4 Jastrząb. Development began in January 1958 as the SZD-21 Sokół, but due to problems with the flying surfaces and a wood metal sandwich, a construction of the design was restarted as the SZD-21 Kobuz (Eurasian hobby), than SZD-21-2 Kobuz. The new SZD-21-2 retained the overall shape of the original project, but was constructed with wood throughout, using multiple spars for the wings. Design team was headed by Jerzy Trzeciak, later joined by M. Gracz in Kobuz 3 constructing.

Flight testing of the SZD-21 Kobuz began on 3 June 1961 with Stanisław Skrzydlewski at the controls, but the results were disappointing prompting a re-build as the SZD-21-2A, with a completely revised fuselage, landing gear, canopy and differential ailerons. Flight tests resumed on in May 1962, but serious problems with the pitch and roll stability at high speed as well as flutter in a certain speed range prompted a further round of modifications. The resulting SZD-21-2AZ (still registered as SP-1990) continued the test program until 20 April 1963, when the aircraft broke up in flight during flutter testing, killing the pilot Sławomir Makaruk.

The final version, the SZD-21-2B Kobuz 3, which was of all wood construction with very stiff wings to resist bending and flutter, was produced in small numbers in Wrocław. It first flew on 10 December 1964. It competed at the highest levels into the late 1980s. Unfortunately, the Kobuz 3 was not immune to accidents and one high-profile fatal accident, at the world glider aerobatic championships at Hockenheim in Germany, highlighted problems with condensation soaking highly stressed wooden parts causing structural failure. The pilot, Krzysztof Wyskiel, was carrying out his competition routine with high accuracy until the penultimate manoeuvre when the wings failed, clapping hands above the fuselage which shot straight down to the ground like an arrow, killing Krzysztof Wyskiel instantly. The three remaining Kobuz 3's in the competition were grounded and remained so until the aircraft were cleared for limited manoeuvres only, curtailing their aerobatic competition careers.

In 1991 the design of a new (composite build) aerobatic glider, S-1 Swift had been finished, based on the Kobuz 3 design (the wings of the first production series of the Swift glider had been manufactured using the wings of Kobus 3 as molds).

== Variants ==
- SZD-21 Sokół – The original designation of the project as begun in 1958.
- SZD-21-2 Kobuz – The initial prototype version, (reg'n SP-1990), which proved unsatisfactory, modified to Kobuz 2A.
- SZD-21-2A Kobuz 2A – The second version of the prototype, (reg'n SP-1990), again disappointing, modified to SZD-21-2AZ
- SZD-21-2AZ – The final modification state of the SZD-21 prototype, (reg'n SP-1990), which crashed on 20 April 1963
- SZD-21-2B Kobuz 3 – The final version of the Kobuz, first flight 10 December 1964, which proved acceptable and a small production batch were completed.

== Specifications (SZD-21 Kobuz 3) ==
Data from http://www.piotrp.de/SZYBOWCE/dszd212b.htm

General characteristics

- Crew: 1
- Length: 7.25 m (23 ft 9 in)
- Wingspan: 14 m (45 ft 11 in)
- Height: 1.9 m (6 ft 2.8 in)
- Wing area: 13.5 m^{2} (145.3 sq ft)
- Aspect ratio: 14.5:1
- Airfoil: NACA 64_{1} 412
- Empty weight: 311 kg (685.6 lb)
- Gross weight: 401 kg (884 lb)

Performance

- Maximum speed: 250 km/h (154.3 mph, 189 kn)
- Stall speed: 73 km/h (45 mph, 39 kn)
- g limits: +7 / −5 as built – (+4 / −1.5 post 1989)
- Maximum glide ratio: 30:1 (19:1 inverted) at 100 km/h (54 kts / 62 mph)
- Rate of sink: 0.90 m/s (177 ft/min) at 100 km/h (54 kn)

== See also ==
Aircraft of comparable role, configuration, and era

- Vogt Lo-100
- Swift S-1
- MDM-1 Fox
- PZL Bielsko SZD-59
