= Vogt Lo-150 =

German single-seat glider

Lo-150

General information
- Type: Glider
- National origin: West Germany
- Designer: Alfred Vogt
- Number built: 15

History
- Developed from: Vogt Lo-100

The Vogt Lo-150 is a West German high-wing, single seat glider that was designed by Alfred Vogt and produced by the Wolf Hirth Company.

== Design and development ==
The Lo-150 was developed from the 10 m (32.8 ft) wing span aerobatic Vogt Lo-100 as a performance cross country sailplane.

The Lo-150 is constructed from wood, including its wooden monocoque fuselage. Its 15 m (49.2 ft) span two-piece wing employs a Clark Y airfoil and incorporates flaps for glidepath control. Early examples use a take-off dolly and land on a fixed skid, while later ones use a fixed monowheel landing gear.

Fifteen Lo-150s were produced.

== Operational history ==
Several Lo-150s were imported into the United States. A.J. Smith won the US Nationals flying an Lo-150 in 1961. Harold Jensen flew an Lo-150 700 km (435 mi) in 1962, winning the Barringer Trophy.

== Specifications (Lo-150) ==
Data from Sailplane Directory and Soaring The World's Sailplanes:Die Segelflugzeuge der Welt:Les Planeurs du Monde

General characteristics

- Crew: one
- Length: 6.15 m (20 ft 2 in)
- Wingspan: 15.0 m (49 ft 3 in)
- Wing area: 10.9 m^{2} (117 sq ft)
- Aspect ratio: 20.6:1
- Airfoil: Clark Y
- Empty weight: 200 kg (441 lb) equipped
- Max takeoff weight: 310 kg (683 lb)

Performance

- Never exceed speed: 200 km/h (120 mph, 110 kn)
- Rough air speed max: 150 km/h (93 mph; 81 kn)
- Aerotow speed: 150 km/h (93 mph; 81 kn)
- Winch launch max speed: 100 km/h (62 mph; 54 kn)
- Maximum glide ratio: 34 at 105 km/h (65 mph; 57 kn)
- Rate of sink: 0.68 m/s (134 ft/min) at 86 km/h (53 mph; 46 kn)
- Wing loading: 28.4 kg/m^{2} (5.8 lb/sq ft)

== See also ==
Aircraft of comparable role, configuration, and era

- Schweizer SGS 1-23

Related lists

- List of gliders
