= Susanne Schoedel =

German glider sport pilot

Susanne Schödel
- Born: 1973 (age 52–53); Germany
- Known for: Glider sport pilot

Susanne Schödel (pronunciation Suza:nne Shœdel) is a multiple world record holder and women's world champion glider sport pilot.

== Biography ==
A former windsurfer, Susanne Schödel began flying in her 20s. She holds a pilot license for engine-powered aircraft. Soaring in sync with wind and thermals gives her the opportunity to optimize her skills and techniques, either during relaxing weekends, in contests or when record flying. A long-time sustainer of the practice, earlier on as flight trainer, at AeroClub Langenselbold, German Aero Club, Susanne continued as member of the national aviation sport team in displays of performance; as a team member as well as solo participant at cross-country flying, Women's gliding championships and events, Gliding competition, which performance vary from aerobatic gliding among the FAI Glider competition classes acknowledged and suitable for competitions.

== Career ==
Schödel has an academic background in Political Science. Her professional career spans various sectors, from being managing director at Susan G. Komen for the Cure e.V. Germany, to public sector, having worked for governmental institutions in Germany.

From 2014 to 2019 Susanne Schödel held the position Secretary General of Fédération Aéronautique Internationale, World Air Sports Federation (FAI).

== Records ==
Susanne Schödel was German women's champion in 2010, and women's world champion in 2009 and 2011, flying Schempp-Hirth Ventus-2. The following table lists Susanne Schödel's FAI records accomplished in Africa, flying Schempp-Hirth aircraft (Schempp-Hirth Arcus, Schempp-Hirth Ventus-2, Schempp-Hirth Nimbus-4) while stationed at Bitterwasser airfield in Namibia.

Claimant	Sport	Subclass	Record type	Record performance	Date	Status	Region
Susanne Schödel (GER)	Gliding	D15	Speed over a triangular course of 750 km	126,1 km/h	30 Dec 2011	Ratified - current record	African
Susanne Schödel (GER)	Gliding	DO	Speed over a triangular course of 750 km	126,1 km/h	30 Dec 2011	Ratified - superseded since approved	African
Susanne Schödel (GER)	Gliding	D15	Free distance using up to 3 turn points	1 066,1 km	20 Dec 2011	Ratified - current record	African
Susanne Schödel (GER)	Gliding	D15	Free distance using up to 3 turn points	1 066,1 km	20 Dec 2011	Ratified - superseded since approved	African
Susanne Schödel (GER)	Gliding	D15	Free triangle distance	1 062,5 km	20 Dec 2011	Ratified - current record	African
Susanne Schödel (GER)	Gliding	D15	Free triangle distance	1 062,5 km	20 Dec 2011	Ratified - current record	African
Susanne Schödel (GER)	Gliding	DO	Free triangle distance	1 062,5 km	20 Dec 2011	Ratified - superseded since approved	African
Susanne Schödel (GER)	Gliding	DO	Triangle distance	1107 km	31 Dec 2013	Ratified - current record	African
Susanne Schödel (GER)	Gliding	DO	Distance using up to 3 turn points	1121,08 km	31 Dec 2013	Ratified - superseded since approved	African
Susanne Schödel (GER)	Gliding	DO	Free distance using up to 3 turn points	1124,5 km	31 Dec 2013	Ratified - superseded since approved	African
Susanne Schödel (GER)	Gliding	DO	Free triangle distance	1110,4 km	31 Dec 2013	Ratified - current record	African
Susanne Schödel (GER)	Gliding	DO	Speed over a triangular course of 500 km	139,20 km/h	03 Jan 2014	Ratified - superseded since approved	African
Susanne Schödel (GER)	Gliding	DO	Free distance using up to 3 turn points	1161,4 km	27 Dec 2017	Ratified - current record	African

The geography and geology of the Kalahari Desert and this part of Africa, create unique conditions for thermals, which allow the naturally powered gliders to fly at higher altitudes, for longer length of time, at various velocities. For record flights established a tree is planted in the area, traditionally a palm tree with plate.
