= Jan Wróblewski (glider pilot) =

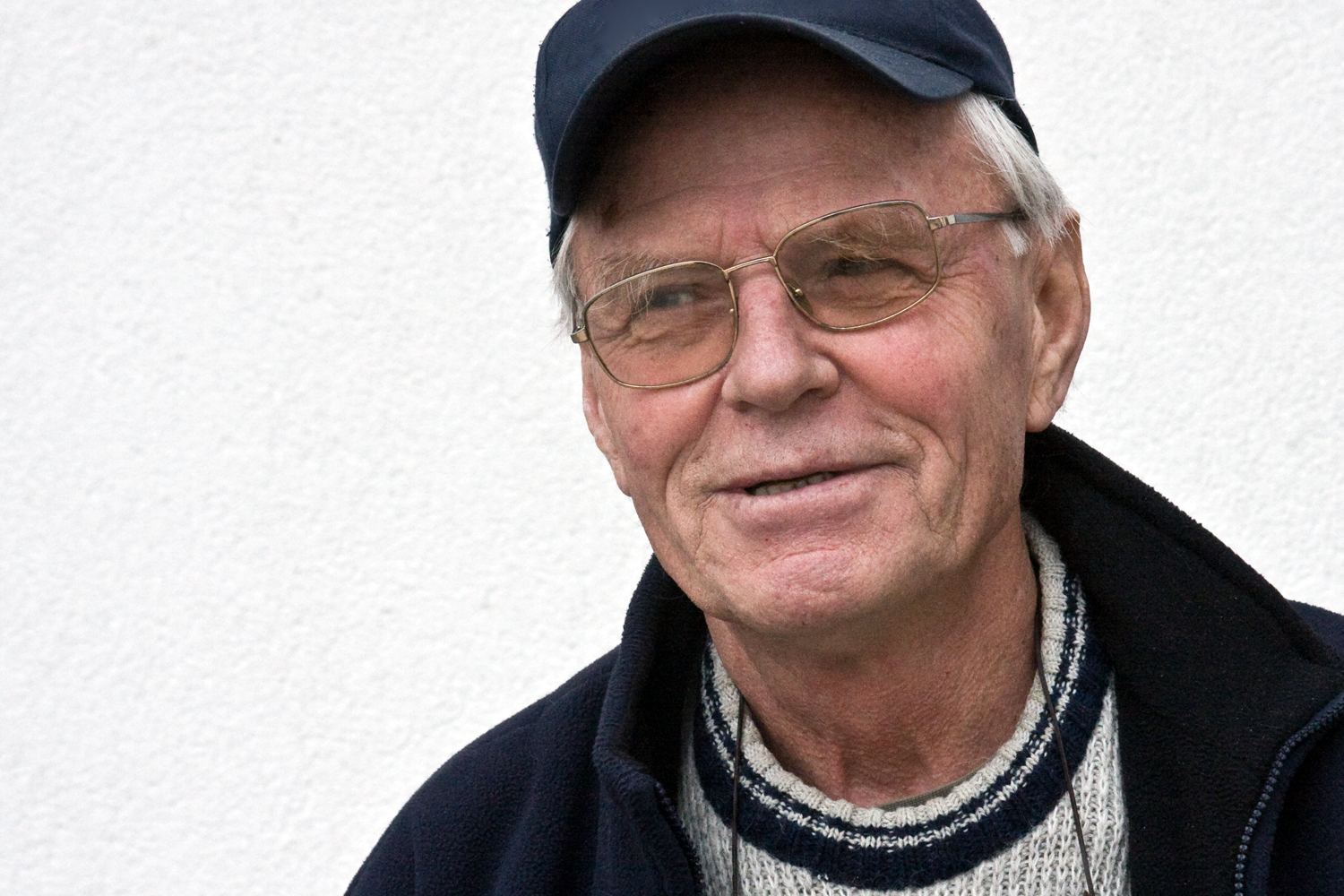
- Jan Wróblewski in 2013
- Born: 6 November 1940 (age 85); Bydgoszcz
- Known for: World Champion title 1965 1972

Jan Wróblewski was born in 1940, he became World champion in 1965 and 1972. He received the Lilienthal Gliding Medal in 1972. During his career he flew more than 10,300 hours.

== Achievements ==
Achievements in international FAI championships
year	competition	ranking
1965	10th FAI World Gliding Championships	1
1970	12th FAI World Gliding Championships	2
1972	13th FAI World Gliding Championships	1
