= Hosín =

- Municipality
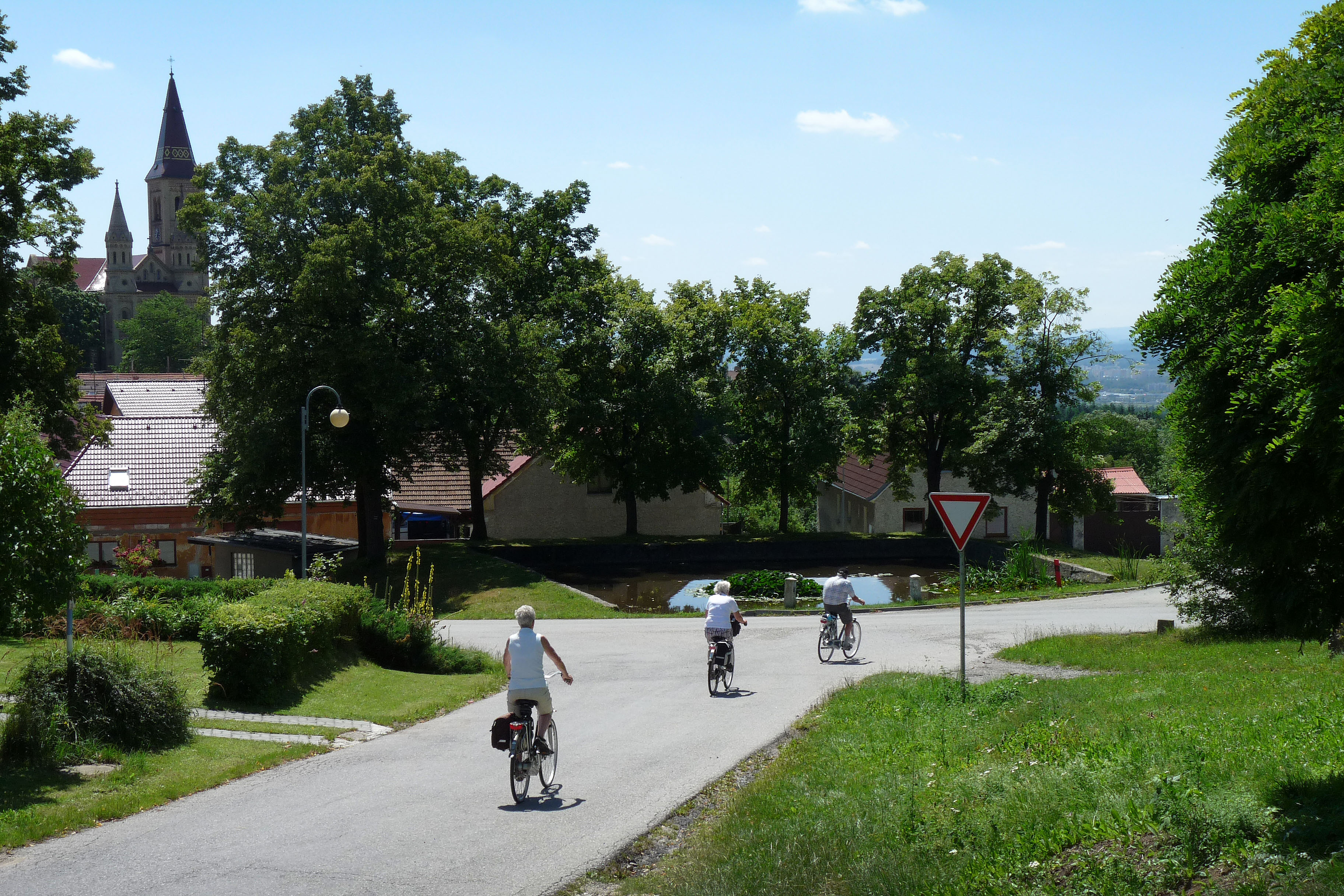
- Centre of Hosín

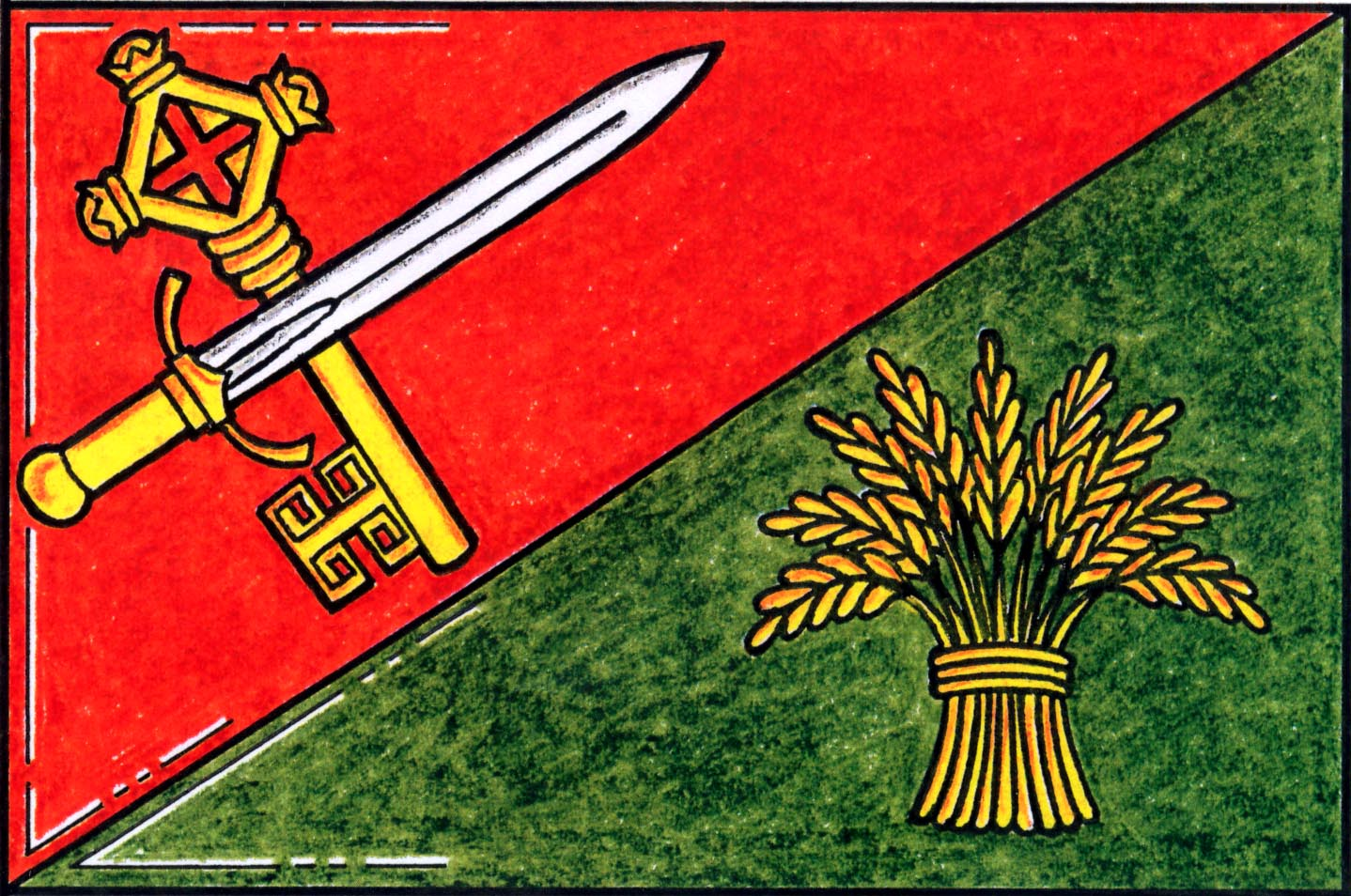
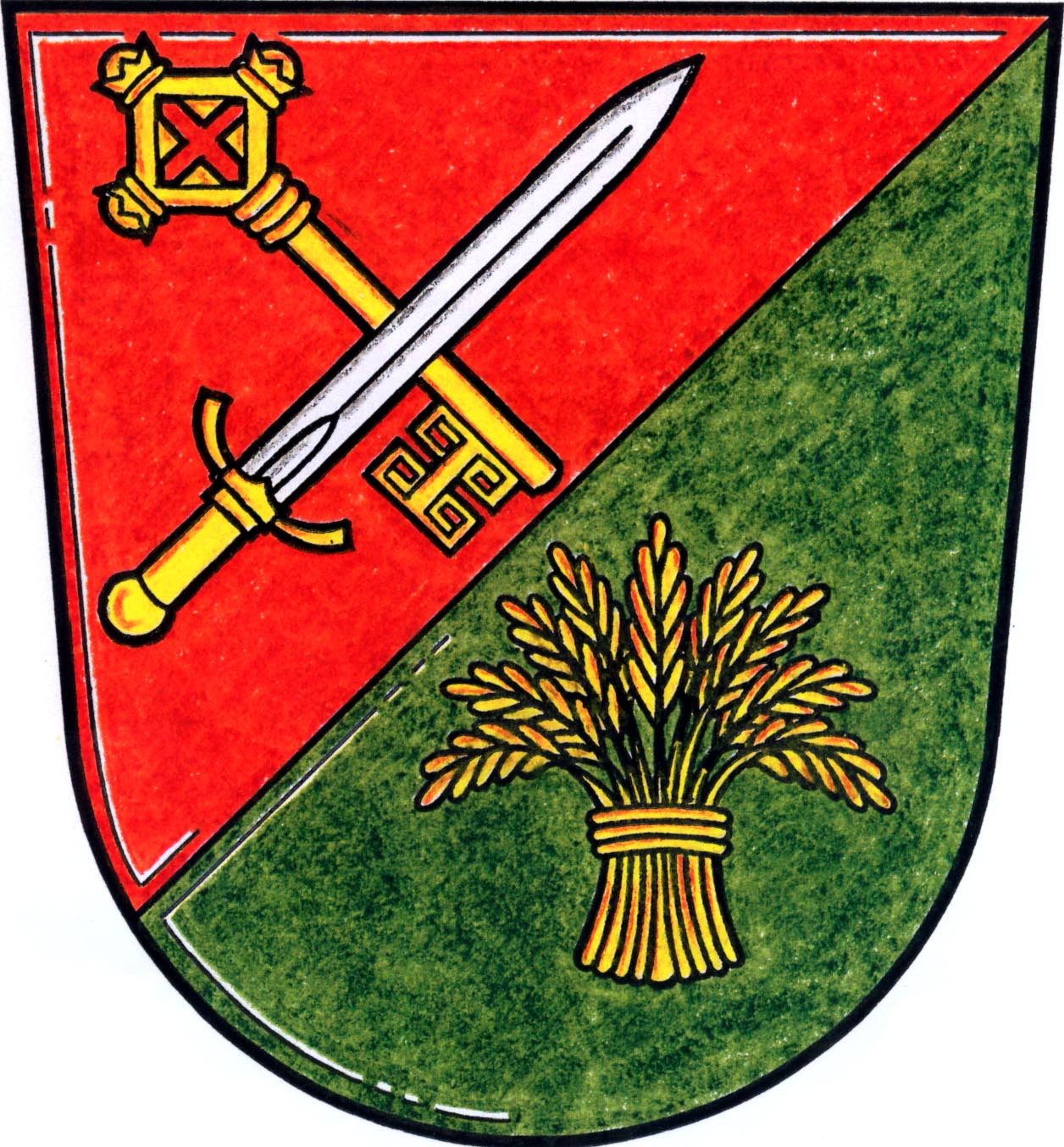
- Flag Coat of arms

- Location in the Czech Republic
- Coordinates: 49°2′15″N 14°28′33″E
- Country: Czech Republic
- Region: South Bohemian
- District: České Budějovice
- First mentioned: 1330

Area
  - Total: 30.97 km^{2} (11.96 sq mi)
- Elevation: 486 m (1,594 ft)

Population (2026-01-01)
  - Total: 970
  - Density: 31/km^{2} (81/sq mi)
- Time zone: UTC+1 (CET)
  - Summer (DST): UTC+2 (CEST)
- Postal code: 373 41
- Website: www.hosin.cz

Hosín is a municipality and village in České Budějovice District in the South Bohemian Region of the Czech Republic. It has about 1,000 inhabitants.

== Administrative division ==
Hosín consists of two municipal parts (in brackets population according to the 2021 census):

- Hosín (614)
- Dobřejovice (288)

== Etymology ==
The initial name of Hosín was Hošín. The name was derived from the personal name Hoša, meaning "Hoša's".

== Geography ==
Hosín is located about 6 km (4 mi) north of České Budějovice. Most of the municipal territory lies in the Tábor Uplands, but the southern part with the village of Hosín lies in a tip of the Třeboň Basin. The highest point is the Baba hill at 570 m (1,870 ft) above sea level. There is a former china clay mine called Orty, protected as a nature monument.

== History ==
The first written mention of Hosín is from 1330. The village was part of the Hluboká estate and shared its owners.

== Demographics ==
Historical population

Year	Pop.	±%
1869	851	—
1880	975	+14.6%
1890	1,011	+3.7%
1900	964	−4.6%
1910	989	+2.6%

Year	Pop.	±%
1921	1,001	+1.2%
1930	961	−4.0%
1950	782	−18.6%
1961	819	+4.7%
1970	661	−19.3%

Year	Pop.	±%
1980	612	−7.4%
1991	610	−0.3%
2001	670	+9.8%
2011	783	+16.9%
2021	902	+15.2%

Source: Censuses

== Transport ==
The D3 motorway (part of the European route E55) from Prague to České Budějovice runs through the eastern part of the municipality.

Hosín is located on the railway line heading from České Budějovice to Tábor and Chotoviny.

== Sport ==
The municipality is home to a sports airport, established in 1957. It used to host major sporting events, including the World Aerobatic Championships in 1978.

== Sights ==
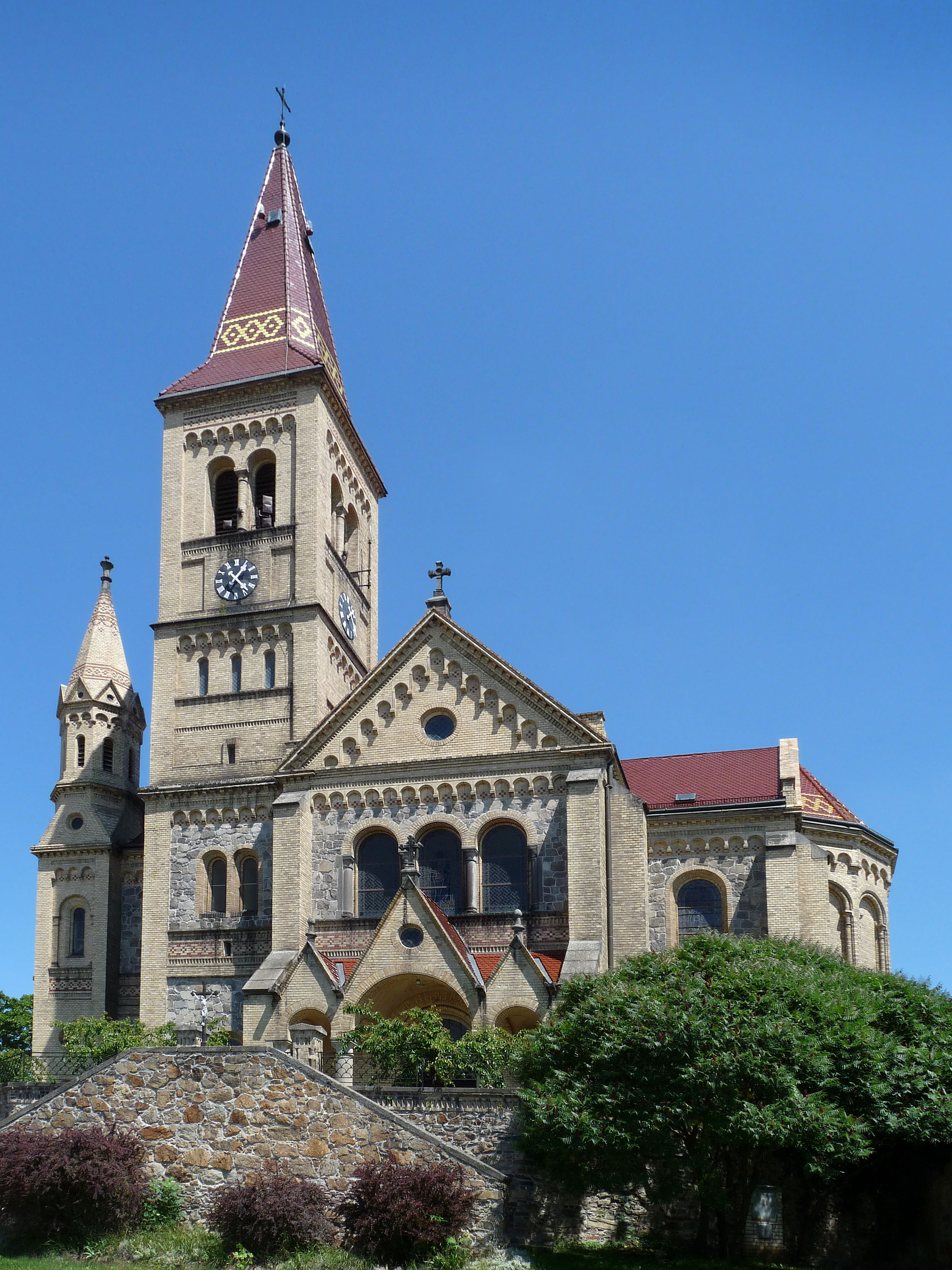
Church of Saint Peter and Paul

The main landmark is the Church of the Saints Peter and Paul. The original church was built in the 11th or 12th century. Between 1260 and 1280, when this sacral building was no longer sufficient for its spatial capacity, the new church was built, in which the former church was incorporated as a sacristy. In 1900, the church was demolished and replaced by a new large church in the Neo-Romanesque style.

Next to the church is a Baroque rectory from the 18th century.
