= Oripää Airfield =

Oripää Airfield Oripään lentokenttä
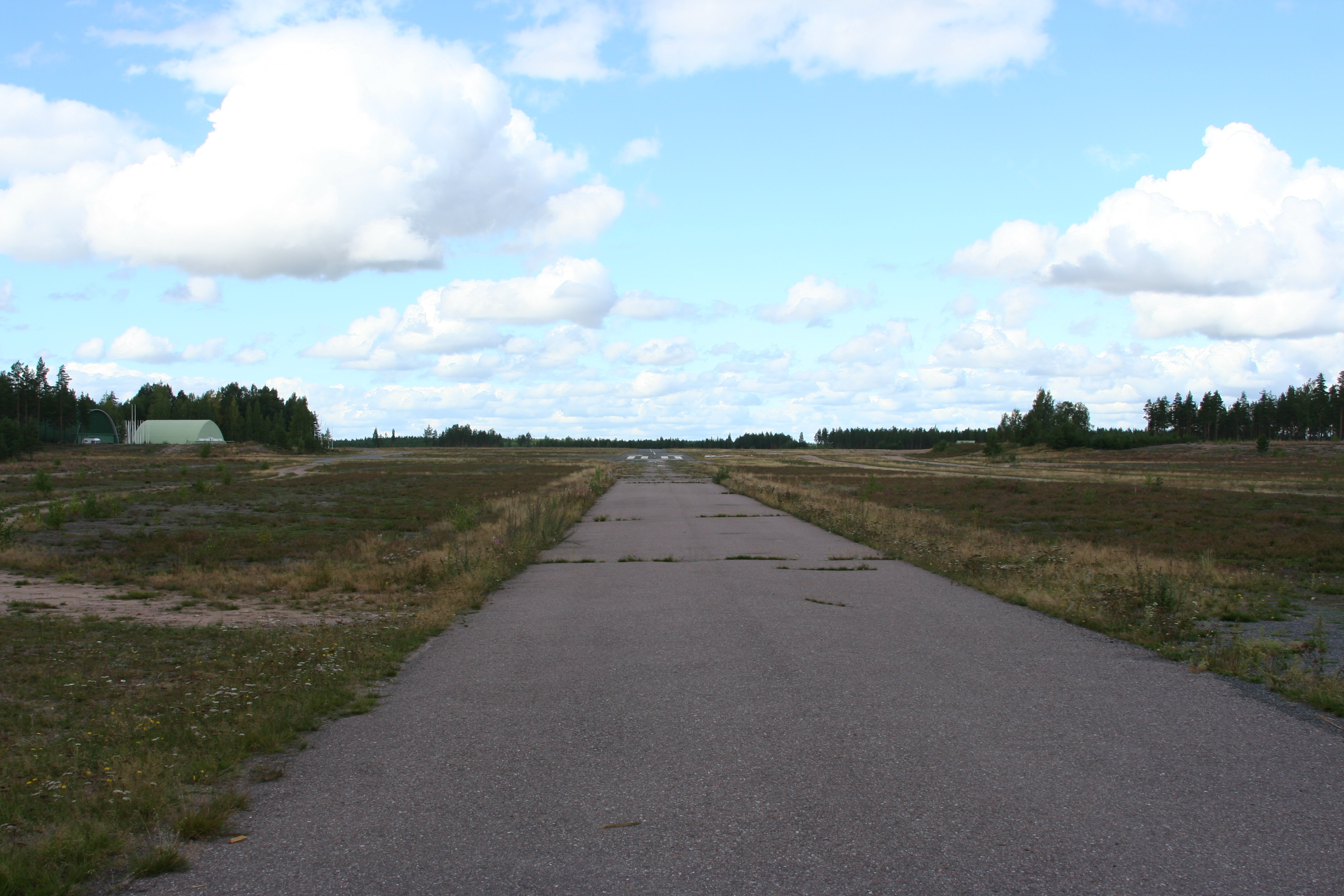
- Runway 14/32 seen from Hirvikoskentie
- IATA: none; ICAO: EFOP

Summary
- Operator: Turun Lentokerho ry
- Location: Oripää, Finland
- Elevation AMSL: 331 ft / 101 m
- Coordinates: 60°52′35″N 022°44′41″E
- Website: www.turunlentokerho.fi/...

Map
- Location within Finland

Runways
Direction	Length		Surface
Direction	m	ft	Surface
06/24	900	2,953	oilgravel
14/32	940	3,084	oilgravel
- Source: VFR Finland

Oripää Airfield is an airfield in Oripää, Finland, 2 kilometres (1.2 mi) northeast of Oripää municipal centre. It hosted World Glider Aerobatic Championships in 2013.

== See also ==
- List of airports in Finland
