= Zbraslavice Airport =

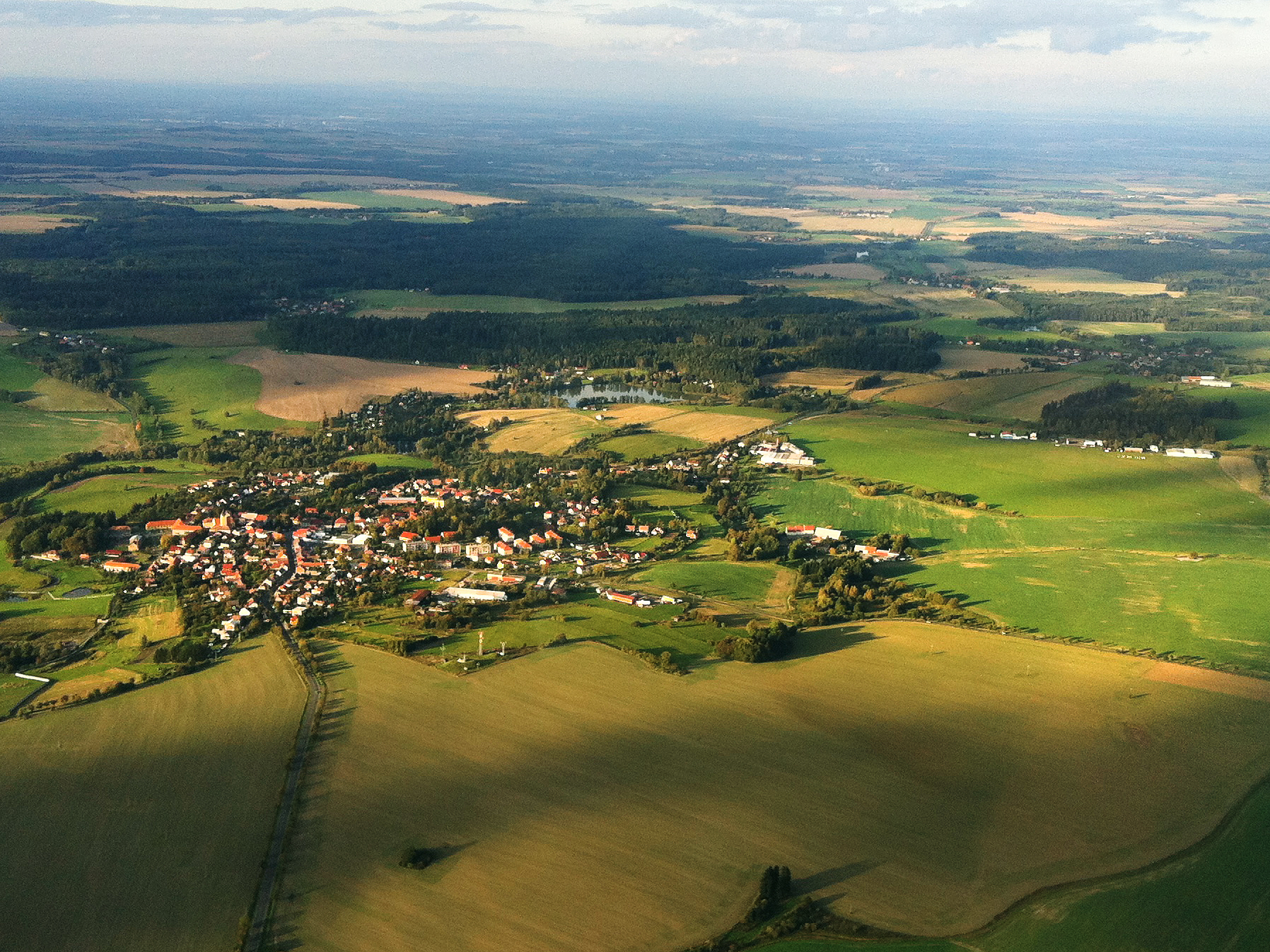
- Airport and village of Zbraslavice
- IATA: none; ICAO: LKZB

Summary
- Airport type: Civil Public
- Operator: Aeroklub Zbraslavice
- Serves: Zbraslavice
- Location: 0.8 kilometres (0.50 mi) N from Zbraslavice
- Elevation AMSL: 1,618 ft / 493 m
- Coordinates: 49°48′50″N 015°12′06″E
- Website: www.lkzb.cz
- Interactive map of Zbraslavice Airport

Runways
Direction	Length		Surface
Direction	m	ft	Surface
15/33	780	2.560	Grass

Zbraslavice Airport (Czech: Letiště Zbraslavice) (ICAO: LKZB) is located 1,5 km North of the small city of Zbraslavice, near the main motorway nr. 126. between the city of Zbraslavice and Štipoklasy village in Central Bohemia. The airfield may be used by light aircraft, helicopters, gliders and ultralights. The keeper is civic society Aeroclub Zbraslavice. Zbraslavice airport is the synonym for superior gliding conditions among pilots and fans of aviation sports worldwide. Therefore, the airport is a place where a number of national and international competitions is held and a lot of pilots from the Czech Republic use the airfield as training base.

== Purpose and operation ==
The airport is equipped to handle VFR (Visual Flight Rules) traffic and is situated on the southern border of the TMA Čáslav Military Airport. During the take-off one should respect the fact that the runway 15 is slightly uphill and the take off distance increases, landing the opposite way "downhill" on RWY 33 increases the landing distance of the arriving aircraft. Throughout the year the wind blows in perpendicular direction to the RWY's. Sometimes with light SE winds RWY 33 (down hill) is used. In such case aircraft take off with light tail wind and land on opposite RWY 15 with headwind. During the spring and summer gliding season the airfield host many sailplanes, therefore the traffic becomes quite dense.

== Public services ==
Zbraslavice airport is offering sightseeing flights on gliders and engine planes to public as well space for flying models for model pilots, technical and social background for private use (hangars, swimming pool, playground, restaurant and accommodation).

To aviation or non-aviation public the airfield offers sightseeing flights on gliders and powered aircraft, and space for flying models, technical and social background (hangars, swimming pool, playground, restaurant and accommodation).

== Flying school ==
=== Glider flying school ===
For those wishing to learn how to fly gliders the Flight School of Aeroclub Zbraslavice offers following trainings:

- Basic glider training to obtain the glider pilot licence (GLD, SPL)
- Continuative and sport training of glider pilot

The basic training starts regularly in the winter months with theoretical education. The practical training starts during spring and summer mainly using the glider L-23 Super Blanik or G-103 Twin Astir. The continuative and sport training is intended for the GLD qualification holders. The student pilots gradually gain the knowledge of flying in the thermals or dynamic soaring near the slopes. Pilots gradually converse to single seated gliders with higher performance. The purpose of the training is to prepare the pilots for sport soaring in such way that the pilot is able to obtain the silver FAI-D badge. Sport pilots of Aeroclub Zbraslavice participate regularly in many soaring competitions, they are members of the Czech national soaring team and gradually reach exceptional results.

=== Engine aircraft flying ===
The engine aircraft training is being performed individually according to the trainees' time demands. Aeroclub Zbraslavice is the holder of the certificate CZ/ATO-12 which allows performing practical module training of new pilots and is able to train individuals with zero aviation awareness all the way to the right hand seat of the commercial airliner.

- Private pilot licence (PPL)
- Commercial pilot licence (CPL)

The holders of PPL and CPL can obtain following qualifications:

- Multi-engine planes (MEP)
- Flight instructor training (FI)
- Instrument rating (IR)
- Qualification for VFR night flying (NIGHT)
- Towing qualification (TOW)

== Sport accomplishments ==
The glider pilots of the Aeroclub Zbraslavice are regularly in front positions of the national gliding competition rank (CPSka). They are the members of the national soaring team of the Czech Republic and among the international competition they gain excellent results. They are as well holders of the sport FAI insignias which are given to pilots under internationally approved rules. 46 pilots are holders of the silver FAI badge, 7 pilots hold the gold FAI badge and 4 pilots hold the gold FAI badge with 3 diamonds and one pilot is the holder of gold FAI badge with 3 diamonds and with the supplement for the flight distance being longer than 1000 km. Aeroclub Zbraslavice was honored among very few clubs worldwide by DIPLOME D´HONNEUR from the international federation of aviation sports FAI for the long term contribution to aviation sports. Flying competitions and enterprises for the public

AZ CUP is a soaring race which is held every year and is known as the first race of the soaring season. The race is prepared for club and open class competitors with the participation of about 80 pilots. Among AZ CUP Aeroclub Zbraslavice is holding the precise flying race such as National Championship in precise flying 2012 and other national gliding competitions. The competitions are freely accessible to public from the public part of the airfield. The access to public visitors on the operation airfield surfaces can be made only under the attendance of the organizing staff.

=== Competitions held in Zbraslavice in the year 2015 ===
- AZ CUP- “First competition of the soaring season”- 16 – 25 April 2015
- Two Seater and Retro Glider Aerobatic Cup Zbraslavice 11–14 June 2015
- Czech Gliding Aerobatics Nationals (Advanced, Unlimited) + Danubia Glider Cup - 8–11 July 2015
- 18th FAI World Glider Aerobatics Championships and 6th FAI World Advanced Glider Aerobatics Championships 5–15 August 2015
