= Vogt Lo-100 =

German single-seat aerobatic glider, 1952

Lo-100
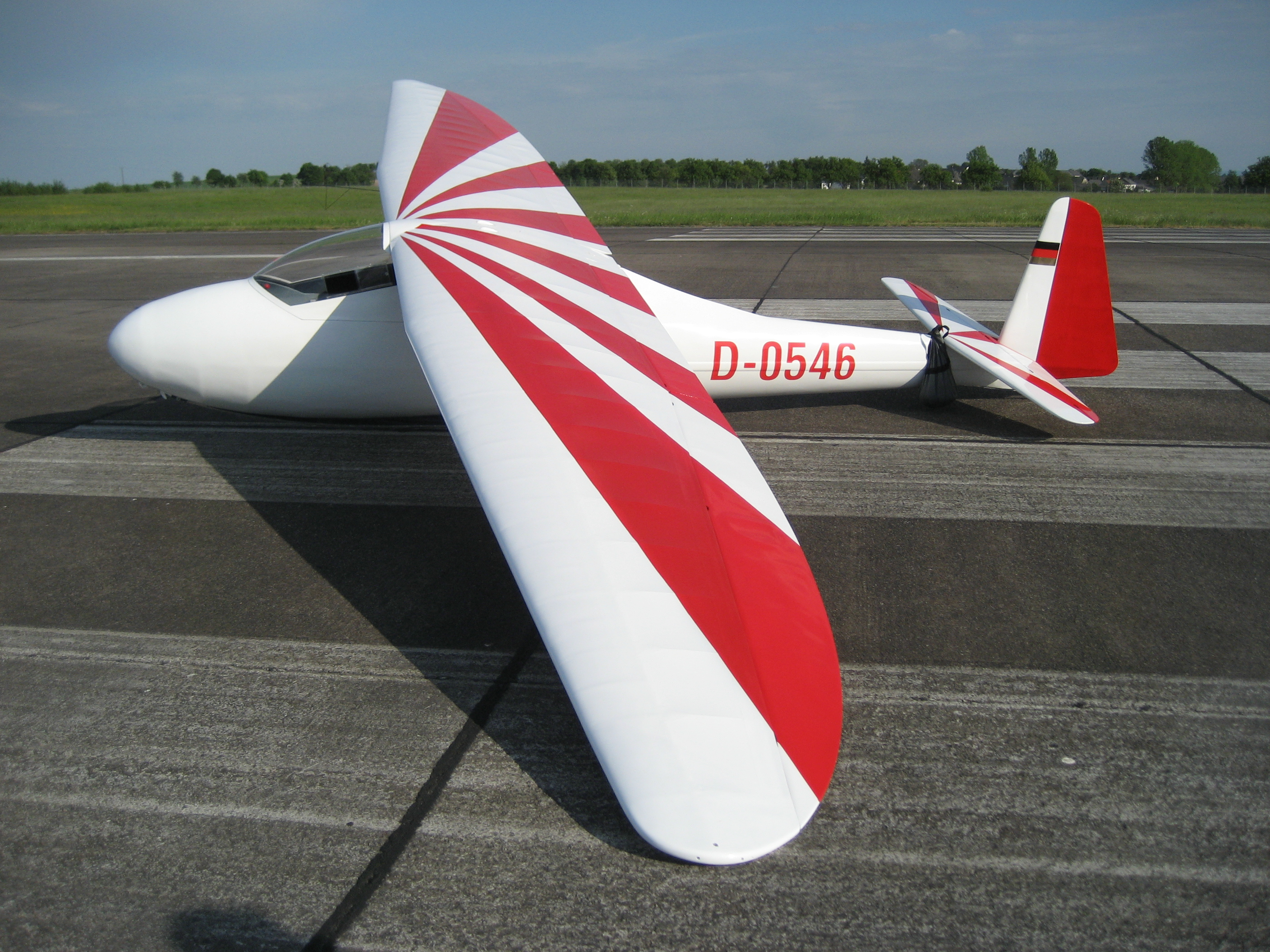
- D-0546 Bitburg Airfield 2007

General information
- Type: Aerobatic sailplane
- National origin: Germany
- Manufacturer: Homebuilt
- Designer: Alfred Vogt
- Number built: ca. 45

History
- First flight: 1952
- Variants: Vogt Lo-150

The Lo-100 is an aerobatic glider of classic wood and fabric construction well suited to amateur building methods. The designation Lo was bestowed by the designer Alfred Vogt in memory of his brother Lothar Vogt, with whom he had developed the predecessor model Lo-105 Zwergreiher ('dwarf heron'). The first flight of the prototype took place in 1952 at the Klippeneck. An example is on display at the Gliding Heritage Centre.

The single-piece wing has a main spar built from laminated beechwood in order to achieve the strength needed for aerobatics. The glider has no spoilers and must be landed using side-slip.

== Specifications ==
Data from The World's Sailplanes:Die Segelflugzeuge der Welt:Les Planeurs du Monde

General characteristics

- Crew: 1
- Length: 6.15 m (20 ft 2 in)
- Wingspan: 10 m (32 ft 10 in)
- Wing area: 10.9 m^{2} (117 sq ft)
- Aspect ratio: 9.2
- Airfoil: Clark Y
- Empty weight: 150 kg (331 lb)
- Max takeoff weight: 265 kg (584 lb) normal flight

245 kg (540.1 lb) aerobatic flight

Performance

- Never exceed speed: 190 km/h (120 mph, 100 kn) normal flight

290 km/h (180.2 mph; 156.6 kn) aerobatic flight

- Rough air speed max: 150 km/h (93.2 mph; 81.0 kn) normal flight

225 km/h (139.8 mph; 121.5 kn) aerobatic flight

- Aerotow speed: 150 km/h (93.2 mph; 81.0 kn) normal flight

225 km/h (139.8 mph; 121.5 kn) aerobatic flight

- Winch launch max speed: 125 km/h (77.7 mph; 67.5 kn) normal flight

140 km/h (87.0 mph; 75.6 kn) aerobatic flight

- Rate of sink: 0.8 m/s (160 ft/min) at 72 km/h (44.7 mph; 38.9 kn)
- Lift-to-drag: 25 at 85 km/h (52.8 mph; 45.9 kn)
- Wing loading: 24.3 kg/m^{2} (5.0 lb/sq ft) normal flight

24.3 kg/m^{2} (4.98 lb/sq ft) aerobatic flight

== See also ==
Related development

- Vogt Lo 150

Related lists

- List of gliders
