= MDM MDM-1 Fox =

Polish aerobatic glider

MDM-1 Fox
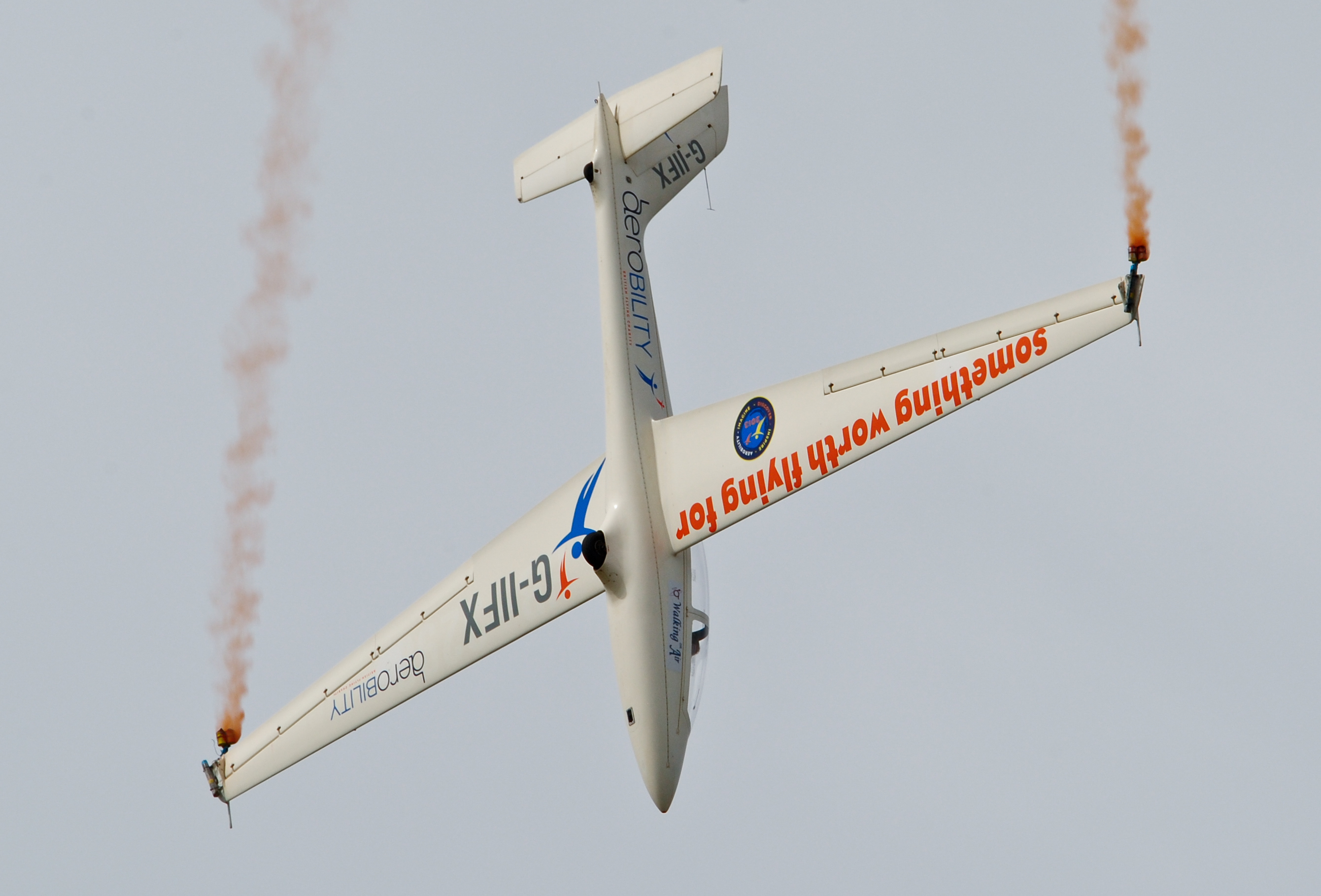

General information
- Type: Aerobatic glider
- National origin: Poland
- Manufacturer: Margański & Mysłowski
- Designer: Edward Margański
- Number built: 53 (+3 in construction)

History
- Manufactured: 1994-present
- Introduction date: 1993
- First flight: 1993

The MDM MDM-1 Fox is a Polish, composite mid-wing two-seater aerobatic glider with fixed undercarriage and conventional tail unit.

This sailplane was first displayed at the World Glider Aerobatic Championships in Venlo, Netherlands, 1993, where Jerzy Makula flew it to win the World Championship. Shortly after the Championships ended, promotional flights were arranged to enable top pilots to fly this aircraft. The Fox has since had several successes at other international competitions.

Production stopped in 2005 after 36 gliders had been built; since 2011, however, production has been resumed.

== Specifications ==
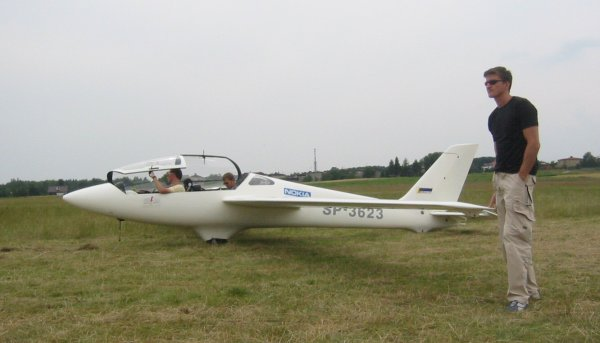

General characteristics

- Crew: Two
- Length: 7.38 m (24 ft 2.6 in)
- Wingspan: 14.00 m (45 ft 11.2 in)
- Wing area: 12.3 m^{2} (132.4 sq ft)
- Aspect ratio: 15.9
- Empty weight: 345 kg (761 lb)
- Gross weight: 525 kg (1,157 lb)

Performance

- Maximum speed: 281 km/h (175 mph, 152 kn)
- Stall speed: 84 km/h (53 mph, 46 kn)
- g limits: +9.0/-6.0 (one occupant), +7.0/-5.0 (two occupants)
- Maximum glide ratio: 30
- Rate of sink: 1.0 m/s (200 ft/min)
