= World Air Games =

International air sports event

World Air Games 2015

The FAI World Air Games (WAG) is an international air sports event organized by Fédération Aéronautique Internationale (World Air Sports Federation - FAI), inspired by the Olympic Games.

== Aims ==
Include showcasing air sports to the general public and attracting new participants.

== Competitions ==
1. Aerobatics
2. Aeromodeling
3. Air racing
4. Ballooning
5. Gliding
6. Hang gliding
7. Helicopter
8. Microlight
9. Parachuting
10. Paragliding

== Editions ==
| # | Year | Host Country | Host City | Dates | Top Nation |
|---|---|---|---|---|---|
| 1 | 1997; Details | Turkey | Turkish Aeronautical Association (THK) | September 15 - September 21 | Russia |
| 2 | 2001; Details | Spain | Royal Spanish Aeronautics Federation (FAE), Royal Aero Club of Spain (RACE) | June 23 - July 1 | Russia |
| 3 | 2009; Details | Italy | Aero Club D'Italia, Turin | June 6 - June 13 | Italy |
| 4 | 2015; Details | United Arab Emirates | Dubai | Dec 1 - Dec 12 | United States |

- FAI World Air Games | World Air Sports Federation
- FAI 1st & 2nd Category Results Portal
- 20th FAI World Air Games 2015 - Dubai, UAE - 1-12 December 2015 : 5th FAI World Air Games 2015 - Dubai, UAE - 1–12 December 2015

=== WAG 2009 ===
The FAI announced on 27 October 2007 the opening of the bidding for the 2009 Games. Turin (Italy) has been chosen to host the World Air Games 2009. The decision was announced by the President of FAI - the World Air Sports Federation, Pierre Portmann, on first of June 2007 at the Olympic Museum, Lausanne.

=== WAG 2015 ===
The FAI World Air Games 2015 has been awarded to the United Arab Emirates and was held in Dubai. This multi-discipline event was organised by the Emirates Aerosports Federation under the patronage of the Crown Prince of Dubai, His Highness Sheikh Hamdan bin Mohammed bin Rashid Al Maktoum and took place from 1 to 12 December 2015. 875 athletes from 55 countries competed in the Games, making it the biggest air sports event ever organised.

== Games cancellation ==
| Number | Year | Country | Host | Date |
|---|---|---|---|---|
| - | 2005; Details | Canceled, Malaysia & Poland being final bidders | | |
| - | 2011; Details | Canceled, Denmark being final bidder | | |
| - | 2022; Details | Canceled, Turkey Due to Covid-19 pandemic | | |

=== 2005 cancellation ===
In early 2005, the FAI Executive Board decided not to continue with the selection procedure for the organisation of World Air Games in 2005. The Board judged that there was insufficient time remaining for the two final bidders, Malaysia and Poland, to solve the various organisational problems.

=== 2011 cancellation ===
On 16 June 2010 the FAI announced the cancellation of the 2011 Games, following the decision of the city of Odense not to host the Games, and uncertainty and risks around a proposed late change to host the games in the city of Herning, also in Denmark.

=== 2022 cancellation ===
The FAI World Air Games 2022 will take place in Turkey and will be organised by the Turkish Aeronautical Association (THK). The contract for the Games was signed by THK and FAI at the Olympic Museum in Lausanne, Switzerland, in February 2018.

On 20 January 2020 the FAI announced the Cancellation of the 2022 World Air Games, due to Covid-19 pandemic.

=== 2025 cancellation ===
Planned but later was cancelled.

== See also ==
- Air sports at the World Games
- Air sports
