= European Gliding Championships =

Biennial gliding competition

The European Gliding Championships is a gliding competition held every two years.

Gliding is a competitive sport and was even a demonstration sport at the 1936 Summer Olympics. It was due to become an official Olympic sport in the Helsinki Games in 1940. However, since the war, gliding has not featured in the Olympics. For gliding, international competition has been provided by the World Gliding Championships since 1938 and also by the European Gliding Championships since 1982.

The increased number of classes of glider means that it is no longer possible for all the classes to compete at the same location. The European Glider Aerobatic Championships were added in 1992. They are also held every two years.

== European Gliding Championships ==
Each of the following entries give the year and location of the contest followed by the winner of each class, nationality and the glider used.

- 1st Championships – 1982 Rieti, Italy
  - Open Class Winner: Klaus Holighaus, West Germany
  - 15-metre Class Winner: Kees Musters, Netherlands
  - Standard Class Winner: Leonardo Brigliadori, Italy
- 2nd Championships – 1984 Vinon-sur-Verdon, France
  - Open Class Winner: Gerard Lherm, France
  - 15-metre Class Winner: Delylle, France
  - Standard Class Winner: Jean-Claude Lopiteaux, France
- 3rd Championships – 1986 Mengen, Germany
  - Open Class Winner: Klaus Holighaus, West Germany
  - 15-metre Class Winner: Daniel M. Pare, Netherlands
  - Standard Class Winner: Bruno Gantenbrink, West Germany
- 4th Championships – 1988 Räyskälä Airfield, Loppi, Finland
  - Open Class Winner: Klaus Holighaus, West Germany
  - 15-metre Class Winner: Gerard Lherm, France
  - Standard Class Winner: Janusz Trzeciak, Poland
- 5th Championships – 1990 Leszno, Poland
  - Open Class Winner: Eberhard Laur, West Germany
  - 15-metre Class Winner: Gabriel Chenevoy, France
  - Standard Class Winner: Janusz Trzeciak, Poland
- 6th Championships – 1992 Békéscsaba, Hungary
  - Open Class Winner: Gerard Lherm, France
  - 15-metre Class Winner: Gilbert Gerbaud, France
  - Standard Class Winner: Franciszek Kepka, Poland
- 7th Championships – 1994 Rieti, Italy
  - Open Class Winner: Bruno Gantenbrink, Germany
  - 15-metre Class Winner: Stefano Ghiorzo, Italy
  - Standard Class Winner: Peter Fischer, Germany
- 8th Championships – 1996 Räyskälä Airfield, Loppi, Finland
  - Open Class Winner: Janusz Centka, Poland, Germany
  - 15-metre Class Winner: Michael Grund, Germany
  - Standard Class Winner: Erwin Ziegler, Germany
- 9th Championships – 1998 Leszno, Poland
  - Open Class Winner: Ulrich Schwenk, Germany
  - 15-metre Class Winner: Hans Obermeyer, Germany
  - Standard Class Winner: Paul Crabb, Ireland
- 10th Championships – 2000 Lüsse, Germany
  - Open Class Winner: Bruno Gantenbrink, Germany; Glider: Schempp-Hirth Nimbus-4
  - 15-metre Class Winner: Steve Jones, UK; Glider: Schempp-Hirth Ventus-2a
  - Standard Class Winner: Jean-Marc Caillard, France; Glider: Schempp-Hirth Discus-2a
- 11th Championships – 2002 Békéscsaba, Hungary
  - Open Class Winner: Tassilo Bode, Germany; Glider: Alexander Schleicher ASW 22 BLE
  - 18-metre Class Winner: Petr Krejčiřík, Czech Republic; Glider: Schempp-Hirth Ventus-C
  - 15-metre Class Winner: Frédéric Hoyeau, France; Glider: Alexander Schleicher ASW 27
  - Standard Class Winner: Tomáš Suchánek, Czech Republic; Glider: Rolladen-Schneider LS8
- 12th Championships – 2004 Pociūnai, Lithuania, Official Website
  - Open Class Winner: Russell Cheetham, UK; Glider: Alexander Schleicher ASW 22 BL
  - 18-metre Class Winner: Wolfgang Janowitsch, Austria; Glider: Schempp-Hirth Ventus-2cx
  - 15-metre Class Winner: Herbert Zemmel, Germany; Glider: Schempp-Hirth Ventus-2
  - Standard Class Winner: Tomasz Rubaj, Poland; Glider: Rolladen-Schneider LS8
- 13th Championships – 2005 Nitra, Slovakia Official Website
  - Club Class Winner: Sebastian Kawa, Poland; Glider: SZD-48-3M Brawo
  - Standard Class Winner: Pavel Loužecký, Czech Republic; Glider: Rolladen-Schneider LS8
  - 18-metre Class Winner: Wolfgang Janowitsch, Austria; Glider: Schempp-Hirth Ventus-2CX
- 13th Championships – 2005 Räyskälä Airfield, Loppi, Finland, Official Website
  - 15-metre Class Winner: Steven Raimond, Netherlands; Glider: Alexander Schleicher ASW 27
  - Open Class Winner: Peter Harvey, UK; Glider: Schempp-Hirth Nimbus-4T
- 14th Championships – 2007 Pociūnai, Lithuania 28 July 2007 – 12 August 2007 Official website
  - 20 meter Two-Seater Class Winners: Gintautas Butnoris Vytautas Rasimavicius, Lithuania; Glider: Schempp-Hirth Duo Discus
  - Club Class Winner: Sebastian Kawa, Poland; Glider: SZD-48-3M Brawo
  - Standard Class Winner: Frederic Hoyeau, France; Glider: Rolladen-Schneider LS8
  - World Class Winner: Krzysztof Herczynski, Poland; Glider: PZL PW-5
- 14th Championships – 2007 Issoudun, France 2 August 2007 – 19 August 2007 Official website
  - 15 meter Class Winner: Janusz Centka, Poland; Glider: Diana 2
  - 18 meter Class Winner: Ronald Termaat, Netherlands; Glider: Ventus-2CXT
  - Open Class Winner: Peter Harvey, UK; Glider: Schempp-Hirth Nimbus-4T
- 15th Championships – 2009 Nitra, Slovakia 27 June 2009 – 11 July 2009 Official website
  - 15 meter Class Winner: Louis Bouderlique, France; Glider: Ventus-2A
  - 18 meter Class Winner: Russell Cheetham, UK; Glider: Alexander Schleicher ASG 29
  - Open Class Winner: Peter Harvey, UK; Glider: Schempp-Hirth Nimbus-4T
- 15th Championships – 2009 Pociūnai, Lithuania 25 July 2009 – 8 August 2009 Official website
  - 20 meter Two-Seater Class Winners: Janusz Centka/M. Szumski, Poland; Glider Schempp-Hirth Duo DiscusxT
  - Club Class Winner: René de Dreu, Netherlands; Glider: LS 1F
  - Standard Class Winner: Mario Kiessling, Germany; Glider: Schempp-Hirth Discus-2a
  - World Class Winner: Jedrzej Sklodowski, Poland; Glider: PZL PW-5
- 16th Championships – 2011 Nitra, Slovakia
  - 20 meter Two seater Class Winner: Harri Hirvola & Visa Matti Leinikki; Finland; Glider:Schempp-Hirth Arcus
  - Club Class Winner: Roman Mraček, Czech Republic; Glider:Schempp-Hirth Standard Cirrus
  - Standard Class Winner: Sebastian Kawa, Poland; Glider: Schempp-Hirth Discus-2a
  - World Class Winner: Jakub Barszcz, Poland; Glider: PZL PW-5
- 16th Championships – 2011 Pociūnai, Lithuania 31 July to 13 August 2011
  - 15 meter Class Winner: Christophe Ruch, France; Glider: Ventus-2A
  - 18 meter Class Winner: Karol Staryszak, Poland; Glider: Alexander Schleicher ASG 29
  - Open Class Winner: Markus Frank, Germany; Glider: Binder EB29
- 17th Championships – 2013 Vinon-sur-Verdon, France 8–21 June 2013
  - 15 meter Class Winner: Louis Bourderlique, France; Glider: Ventus-2A
  - 18 meter Class Winner: Sebastian Kawa, Poland; Glider: Alexander Schleicher ASG 29
  - Open Class Winner: Michael Sommer, Germany; Glider: Binder EB29
- 17th Championships – 2013 Ostrów Wielkopolski, Poland, 5–20 July 2013
  - Standard Class: Sebastian Kawa, Poland; Glider: Schempp-Hirth Discus-2a
  - Club Class: Roman Mraček, Czech Republic; Glider:Schempp-Hirth Standard Cirrus
  - 20 meter Multi-seat Class: Wolfgang Janowitsch & Andreas Lutz, Austria; Glider: Schempp-Hirth Arcus M
- 18th Championships – 2015, Ocseny, Hungary, 12–25 July 2015, (18m, 20m and Open Classes)
  - 18 meter Class Winner: Sebastian Kawa, Poland; Glider: Alexander Schleicher ASG 29
  - Open Class Winner: Lukasz Wojcik, Poland; Glider: Jonker JS1C
  - 20 meter Multi-seat Class: Wolfgang Janowitsch & Andreas Lutz, Austria; Glider: Schempp-Hirth Arcus M
- 18th Championships – 2015, Rieti, Italy, 2–15 August 2015. (Standard, Club and 15m Classes)
  - 15 meter Class Winner: Didier Hauss, France; Glider: Ventus-2
  - Standard Class: Lukasz Blaszczyk, Poland; Glider: Schempp-Hirth Discus-2a
  - Club Class: Ondřej Dvořák, Czech Republic; Glider:Schempp-Hirth Standard Cirrus
- 19th Championships – 2017, Lasham Airfield, UK, 23 July – 6 August 2017, (15m, 18m and Open Classes)
  - 15 meter Class Winner: Freddy Hein, Germany; Glider: Ventus-2ax
  - 18 meter Class Winner: Wolfgang Janowitsch, Austria; Glider: Schempp-Hirth Ventus-3t
  - Open Class Winner: Michael Sommer, Germany; Glider:Binder EB29R
- 19th Championships – 2017, Moravská Třebová, Czech Republic, 23 July – 5 August 2017, (Standard, Club and 20m Classes)
  - Standard Class Winner: Pavel Loužecký, Czech Republic; Glider: Rolladen-Schneider LS8
  - Club Class Winner: Tim Kuijpers, Netherlands; Glider: Schempp-Hirth Standard Cirrus
  - 20 meter Multi-seat Class Winner: Sebastian Kawa & Christoph Matkowski, Poland; Glider:ASG-32 Mi
- 20th Championships – 2019, Turbia, Poland, 12–25 May 2019, (18m, 20m and Open Classes)
  - 18 meter Class Winner: Sebastian Kawa, Poland; Glider: Diana 3
  - Open Class Winner: Petr Tichý, Czech Republic; Glider: Binder EB29R
  - 20 meter Multi-seat Class: Tomasz Rubaj & Christoph Matkowski, Poland; Glider: ASG-32 Mi
- 20th Championships – 2019, Prievidza, Slovakia, 7–20 July 2019, (Standard, Club and 15m Classes)
  - Standard Class Winner: Pavel Loužecký, Czech Republic; Glider: LS-8
  - Club Class Winner: Tom Arscott, Great Britain; Glider: LS7
  - 15 meter Class Winner: Sebastian Kawa, Poland; Glider: Diana 2
- 21st Championships – 2022, Pociūnai, Lithuania, 3–15 July 2022, (Standard, Club and 15m Classes)
  - Standard Class Winner: Jan-Ola Nordh, Sweden; Glider: Schempp-Hirth Discus-2t
  - Club Class Winner: Tomáš Suchánek, Czech Republic; Glider: Schleicher ASW 20
  - 15 meter Class Winner: Sebastian Kawa, Poland; Glider: Diana 2 FES V
- 21st Championships – 2023, Leszno, Poland, 30 July – 11 August 2023, (18m, 20m and Open Classes)
  - 18 meter Class Winner: Łukasz Wójcik, Poland; Glider: Ventus 3T
  - Open Class Winner: Markus Frank, Germany; Glider: Binder EB29R
  - 20 meter Multi-seat Class: Simo Kettunen & Juha Sorri, Finland; Glider: Schempp-Hirth Arcus M
- 22nd Championships – 2024, Tábor, Czech Republic, 4–16 August 2024, (15m, Standard and Club Classes)
  - 15 meter Class Winner: Łukasz Grabowski, Poland; Glider: SZD-56-2 Diana 2
  - Standard Winner: Robin Sittmann, Germany; Glider: Schempp-Hirth Discus 2a
  - Club Class Winner: Jacek Flis, Poland; Glider: LS3 wl
- 23rd Championships – 2025, Békéscsaba, Hungary, 27 August–8 August 2025, (18m, 20m and Open Classes)
  - 18 meter Class Winner: Victor Mallick, France; Glider: Jonker JS-3 Rapture
  - Open Class Winner: Felipe Levin, Germany; Glider: Binder EB29R
  - 20 meter Multi-seat Class: Sebastian Kawa & Christoph Matkowski, Poland; Glider: ASG-32 Mi
- 24th Championships – 2026, Ostrów Wielkopolski, Poland, 12–24 July 2026, (15m, Standard and Club Classes)
  - 15 meter Class Winner: Łukasz Grabowski, Poland; Glider: Schleicher AS 33 Es
  - Standard Winner: Robin Smit, Netherlands; Glider: Rolladen-Schneider LS-8 Neo
  - Club Class Winner: Alexandre Fierain, France; Glider: Rolladen-Schneider LS3 wl

== European Women's Gliding Championships ==
1st European Women s Gliding Championships in Hungary 1979

- champion: Monika Warstat (East Germany); runner-up: Eda Laan (UDSSR/Lithuania); placed: Jindra Paluskova (CSSR)

2nd European Women s Gliding Championships in France 1981

- standard class
- 15m class

3rd European Women s Gliding Championships in Saint Hubert (Belgium) 1983 (originally supposed to be held in Oryol (UDSSR))

- standard class
- 15m class champion: Giesela Weinreich (West Germany)

4th European Women s Gliding Championships in Subotica Yugoslavia 1985

- standard class
- 15m class champion: Gisela Weinreich (West Germany); runner-up: Geogeo Litt (Belgium); third place: Maria Kyzivatova

5th European Women s Gliding Championships in Bulgaria 1987

- standard class
- 15m class

6th European Women s Gliding Championships in Oriol (UDSSR) 1989

- standard class: Marie Kyzivatová (Czechoslovakia)
- 15m class: Gisela Weinrich (Germany)

7th European Women s Gliding Championships in Husbands Bosworth (UK) 1991

- standard class: Gisela Weinrich (Germany)
- 15m class: Valentina Toporova (Soviet Union)

8th European Women s Gliding Championships in Hosín (CZE)

- standard class: Maika Hohn (Germany)
- 15m class champion: Hana Zejdová (Czech Republic)

9th International European Women's Gliding Championships in Marpingen (Germany), 1995

- standard class: Maren Thomas (Germany)
- 15m class: Bozena Demczenko (Poland)
- club class champion: Anna Michalak (Poland); runner-up: Rieke Hastert (Germany); third: Halina Rynkiewicz (Poland)

10th International European Women's Gliding Championships in Prievidza Slovakia, 1997

- standard class: Gundula Goeke (Germany)
- 15m class: Gisela Weinrich (Germany)
- club class:Claire Luyat (France)

11th European Women's Gliding Championships in Leszno (Poland), 1999 held in conjunction with the 2nd World Class World Championship

- standard class
- 15m class
- club class:Claire Luyat (France)

The FAI granted World Championship status to international women's contests in 2001. The 1st World Gliding Championships were held in Pociūnai (Lithuania). However, this decision was made rather late so that it was essentially a European contest. For the results of this and the following women's contests refer to Women's World Gliding Championships.

== European Junior Gliding Championships ==
1st European Junior Gliding Championships in Falköping (Sweden), 1991

- Standard Class Winner: Tomasz Rubaj (Poland), glider: SZD 55
- Club Class Winner: Flemming L. Schneider (Denmark),

2nd European Junior Gliding Championships in La Roche-sur-Yon (France), 1993

- Standard Class Winner: Lars Ternholt (Denmark),
- Club Class winner: Yann Mignot (France), glider: Pégase C101

3rd European Junior Gliding Championships in Leszno (Poland), 1995

- Standard Class Winner: Guido Achleitner (Germany),
- Club Class Winner: Frank Hahn (Germany),

4th European Junior Gliding Championships in Musbach (Germany), 1997

- Standard Class Winner: Mario Kiessling (Germany),
- Club Class Winner: Michael Sommer (Germany)

The contests were replaced by the Junior World Gliding Championships in 1999. Due to the COVID-19 pandemic, the calendar was revised to shift the World and European Gliding Championships by one year, additionally reintroducing the European Junior Gliding Championships in 2021.

5th European Junior Gliding Championships in Pociūnai (Lithuania), 2021

- Standard Class Winner: Simon Briel (Germany),
- Club Class Winner: Finn Sleigh (United Kingdom),

6th European Junior Gliding Championships in Arnborg (Denmark), 30 July – 11 August 2023

- Standard Class Winner: Lukáš Kríž (Czech Republic) Rolladen-Schneider LS8a
- Club Class Winner: Kim Toppari (Finland) Rolladen-Schneider LS7

7th European Junior Gliding Championships in Prievidza (Slovakia), 6–19 July 2025

- Standard Class Winner: Lukáš Kříž (Czech Republic) Rolladen-Schneider LS8a
- Club Class Winner: Lars van Breemen (Netherlands) Rolladen-Schneider LS4b Neo

== European Glider Aerobatic Championships ==
European Glider Aerobatic Championships are held every two years, so that they alternate with World Glider Aerobatic Championships which are held every two years since 1985. These contests are flown in the unlimited category, only. In 2006, the first European Advanced Glider Aerobatic Championships was held in Bad Frankenhausen in conjunction with the German Glider Championships in the unlimited and advanced category. The second European Advanced Glider Aerobatic Championships were held in conjunction with the 2008 German Glider Aerobatic Championships in Rothenburg–Görlitz (26 July 2008 – 3 August 2008).

1st European Glider Aerobatic Championships

2nd European Glider Aerobatic Championships, Rieti (Italy) 1994

3rd FAI European Glider Aerobatic Championships, Pér (Hungary), 27 June 1996 – 6 July 1996

- Individual results:
1. Mikhail Mamistov (Russia), glider: Swift S-1
2. Jerzy Makula (Poland), glider: MDM-1 Fox
3. Adam Michałowski (Poland), glider: Swift S-1
- Team winners:
1. Russia:Mikhail Mamistov (Swift S-1), Sergey Rakhmanin (Swift S-1), Sergei Krikalev (Swift S-1)
2. Poland:Jerzy Makula (MDM-1 Fox), Adam Michałowski (Swift S-1), Marek Hernik (MDM-1 Fox)
3. Czech Republic: Martin Stáhalík (MDM-1 Fox), Petr Poborský (MDM-1 Fox), Josef Čech (MDM-1 Fox)

4th FAI European Glider Aerobatic Championships, Ostrów Wielkopolski (Poland), 19 July 1998 – 2 August 1998

- Individual results:
1. Jerzy Makula (Poland), glider: MDM-1 Fox
2. Georgij Kaminski (Russia), glider: Swift S-1
3. Adam Michałowski (Poland), glider: Swift S-1
- Team winners:
1. Poland: Jerzy Makula (MDM-1 Fox), Adam Michałowski (Swift S-1), Małgorzata Margańska (Swift S-1)
2. Russia: Georgij Kaminski (Swift S-1), Valentin Barabanov (Swift S-1), Alexandr Panfierov (Swift S-1)
3. Czech Republic: Petr Poborský (MDM-1 Fox), Přemysl Vávra (MDM-1 Fox), Jiří Peprný (MDM-1 Fox)

5th FAI European Glider Aerobatic Championships Salon de Provence (France), 7 August 2000 – 20 August 2000

- Individual results:
1. Ferenc Tóth (Hungary)
2. Jerzy Makula (Poland)
3. Georgij Kaminski (Russia)
- Team winners:
1. Poland: Jerzy Makula, Adam Michałowski, Krzysztof Brząkalik
2. Hungary: Ferenc Tóth, István Matuz, János Szilágyi
3. Russia: Georgij Kaminski, Alexandr Panfierov, Valentin Barabanov

6th FAI European Glider Aerobatic Championships, Pasewalk (Germany) – 16 July 2002 – 26 July 2002

- no official results due to poor weather conditions

7th FAI European Glider Aerobatic Championships, Moravská Třebová (Czech Republic), 6 July 2004 – 18 July 2004

- Individual results:
1. Jerzy Makula (Poland)
2. Alexandr Panfierov (Russia)
3. Ferenc Tóth (Hungary)

8th FAI European Glider Aerobatic Championships, Rybnik (Poland), 19 July 2006 – 29 July 2006

- Individual results:
1. Ferenc Tóth (Hungary), glider: Swift S-1
2. Jerzy Makula (Poland), glider: Solo-Fox
3. Georgij Kaminski (Russia), glider: Swift S-1
- Team winners:
1. Hungary: Ferenc Tóth (Swift S-1), János Szilágyi (Swift S-1), Szabolcs Kühtreiber (Swift S-1)
2. Russia: Georgij Kaminski (Swift S-1), Igor Plakhsin (Swift S-1), Olga Romanenko (Swift S-1)
3. Germany: Eugen Schaal (MDM-1 Fox), Markus Feyerabend (Swift S-1), Olaf Schmidt (Swift S-1)

9th FAI European Glider Aerobatic Championships, Radom (Poland), 7 July 2008 – 17 July 2008

- Individual results:
1. Ferenc Tóth (Hungary), glider: Swift S-1
2. Erik Piriou (France), glider: Swift S-1
3. Markus Feyerabend (Germany), glider: Swift S-1
- Team winners:
1. Czech Republic: Přemysl Vávra (Swift S-1), Jan Rozlivka (Swift S-1), Miroslav Červenka (Swift S-1)
2. Russia: Alexandr Panfierov (Swift S-1), Georgij Kaminski (Swift S-1), Igor Plakhsin (Swift S-1)
3. Germany: Markus Feyerabend (Swift S-1), Olaf Schmidt (Swift S-1), Hans-Georg Resch (Swift S-1)

10th FAI European Glider Aerobatic Championships, Jämijärvi (Finland), 17 July 2010 – 24 July 2010

- Individual results:
1. Erik Piriou (France), glider: Swift S-1
2. Ferenc Tóth (Hungary), glider: Swift S-1
3. Dietmar Poll (Austria), glider: Swift S-1
- Team winners:
1. Hungary: Ferenc Tóth (Swift S-1), János Szilágyi (Swift S-1), Szabolcs Kühtreiber (Swift S-1)
2. France: Erik Piriou (Swift S-1), Daniel Serres (Swift S-1), Pierre Albertini (Swift S-1)
3. Poland: Maciej Pospieszynski (Swift S-1), Jerzy Makula (Solo-Fox), Stanisław Makula (Solo-Fox)
