= PZL M-17 =

PZL M-17 Duduś Kudłacz
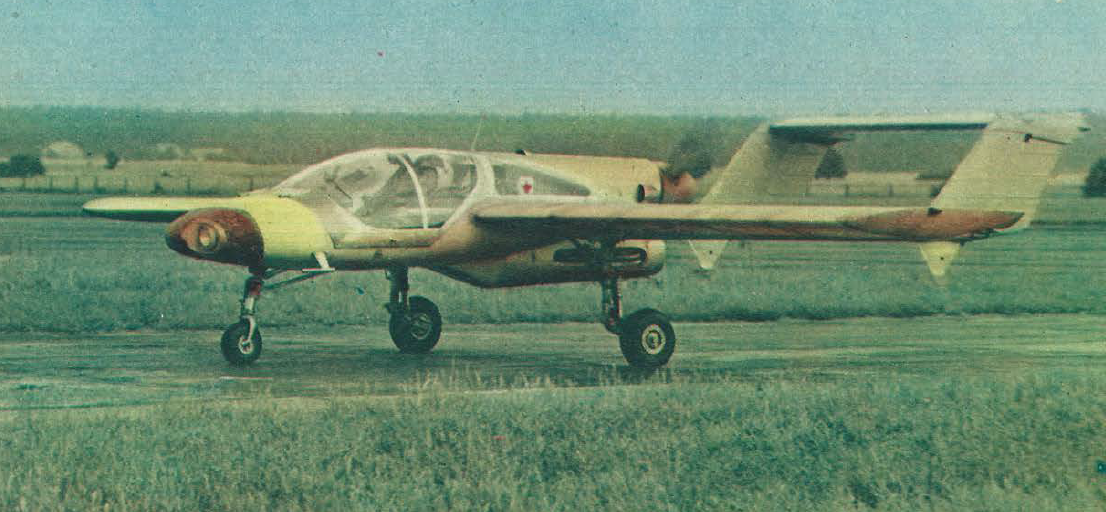

General information
- Type: General aviation aircraft
- Manufacturer: PZL-Mielec
- Status: prototype
- Primary user: Poland
- Number built: 1

History
- First flight: 7 July 1977

The PZL M-17 "Duduś Kudłacz" (initially EM-5A) was a Polish twin-boom pusher general aviation and trainer aircraft of 1977, which remained a prototype.

== Design and development ==
The aircraft was an amateur design of a team of students of Warsaw University of Technology (Politechnika Warszawska) led by Edward Margański. It had an unorthodox layout of a pusher with twin booms and very streamlined fuselage. A crew of two sat side by side, and had double controls. A tricycle landing gear was retractable.

The plane was designed in 1969–1971. At the design stage it was designated EM-5A (EM for Margański) and nicknamed Duduś Kudłacz (Hairy Duduś). The aircraft factory PZL-Mielec in Mielec got interested in the design and took over its development, under a designation PZL M-17. The design was modified there with help of Margański, plastic and duralumin construction was changed to riveted duralumin, and a less powerful engine.

The only prototype was flown on 7 July 1977 by S. Wasil. It was not produced in series. In 1979 the prototype was given to Rzeszów University of Technology. A shortcoming of a streamlined fuselage was a cramped cockpit, the crewmen were half-laying in a similar way, as in gliders.

The plane was a mid-wing monoplane. It had a two-blade wooden propeller and a 310-liter fuel tank.

== Specifications ==
Data from Jane's all the world's aircraft, 1975-76

General characteristics

- Crew: 2
- Length: 6.5 m (21 ft 4 in)
- Wingspan: 9.2 m (30 ft 2 in)
- Height: 1.7 m (5 ft 7 in)
- Wing area: 11.3 m^{2} (122 sq ft)
- Aspect ratio: 7.5
- Airfoil: NACA 66-215
- Empty weight: 650 kg (1,433 lb)
- Gross weight: 900 kg (1,984 lb)
- Max takeoff weight: 1,050 kg (2,315 lb)
- Fuel capacity: 210 L (55 US gal; 46 imp gal)
- Powerplant: 1 × Avia M 137 6-cyl. inverted air-cooled in-line piston engine, 130 kW (180 hp)
- Propellers: 3-bladed controllable-pitch, 1.7 m (5 ft 7 in) diameter

Performance

- Maximum speed: 360 km/h (220 mph, 190 kn) at sea level
- Cruise speed: 250 km/h (160 mph, 130 kn) at 3,000 m (9,800 ft)
- Stall speed: 95 km/h (59 mph, 51 kn) flaps down
- Never exceed speed: 500 km/h (310 mph, 270 kn)
- Range: 600 km (370 mi, 320 nmi)
- Service ceiling: 6,500 m (21,300 ft)
- Rate of climb: 7.9 m/s (1,560 ft/min)
- Wing loading: 76.6 kg/m^{2} (15.7 lb/sq ft)
- Power/mass: 0.149 kW/kg (0.091 hp/lb)

== See also ==
- EM-11 Orka

Aircraft of comparable role, configuration, and era

- RFB Fantrainer
