= Allstar SZD-59 =

Polish single-seat glider, 1991

SZD 59 Acro
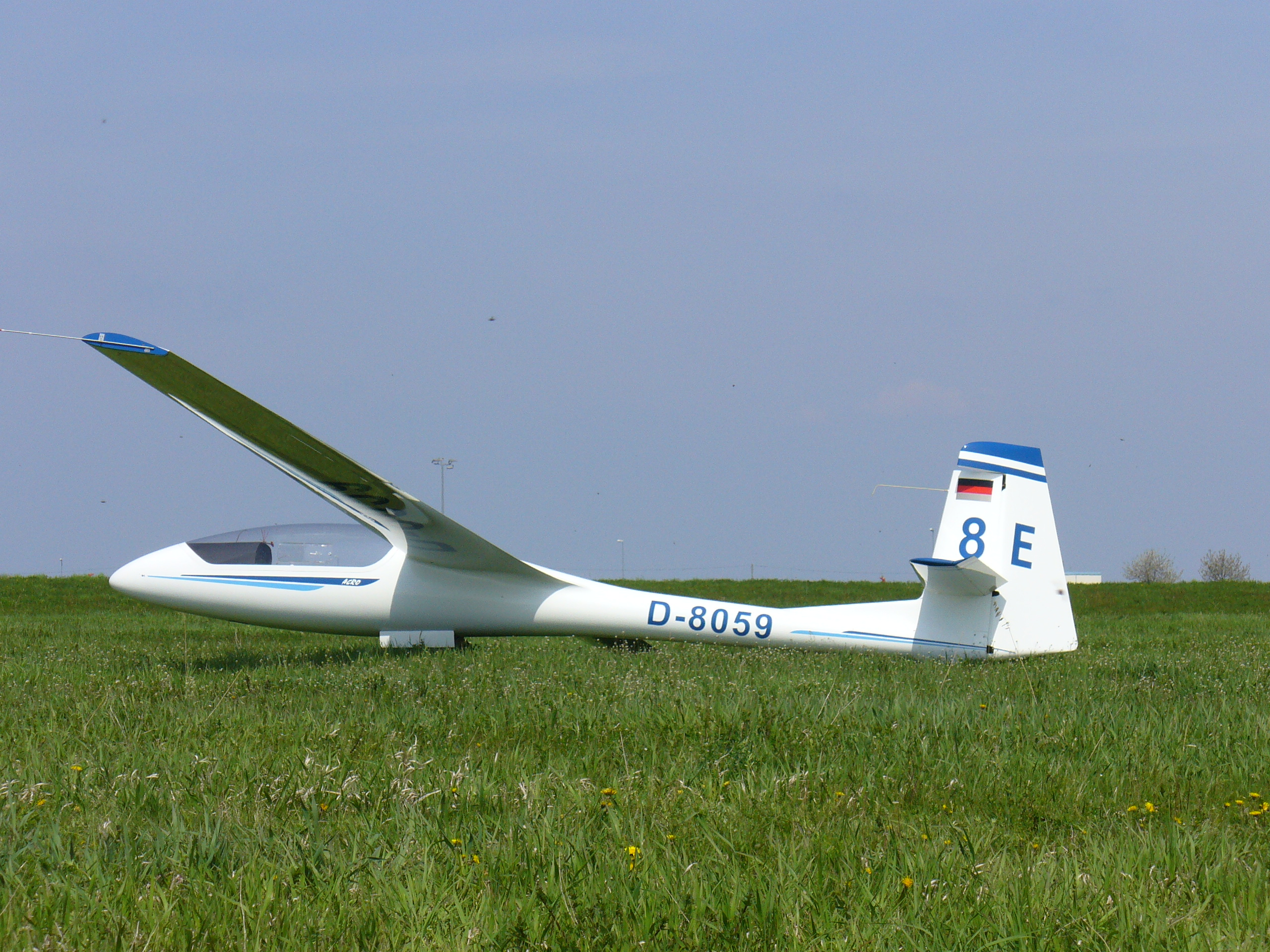

General information
- Type: Club Class and aerobatic glider
- National origin: Poland
- Manufacturer: Allstar PZL Glider Sp.z o.o.
- Designer: Jan Knapik
- Number built: 2 prototypes and 23 or more serial ones

History
- First flight: 9 September 1991
- Developed from: PZL Bielsko SZD-48-3 Jantar 3

The SZD-59 Acro is a single-seat glass composite glider for aerobatics and cross-country flying by PZL Allstar of Bielsko-Biała, Poland.

The SZD-59 can be flown with a 13.2m span or a 15.0m span. Attaching or detaching the wing-tips takes only a few minutes. With 15m wing-tips it is a competitive Club Class glider, while it is a competitive aerobatic glider in the 13.2m configuration.

== Design and certification ==
The SZD-59 Acro was derived from the SZD-48-3 Jantar Standard 3 in 1990–91 mainly by Jan Knapik. The fuselage is only a slightly modified version of the one used in the Jantar Standard 3. However, the T-tail has been replaced by a cross-tail with larger rudder and the elevator of the SZD-42-2 Jantar 2.

The design life is 15,000 hours, though at present it is approved for only 4,000 hours of operation. In 15m configuration, the SZD-59 is approved in the utility category of JAR 22 (sailplanes) of the Joint Aviation Authorities, and in the 13.2m configuration it is approved according to the aerobatics category of JAR 22.

== Manufacturer ==
The prototype was first demonstrated during the 1991 FAI World Glider Aerobatic Championships in Zielona Góra. Twelve Acros were built by PZL-Bielsko until the production stopped in 1996 due to economic problems. Allstar PZL Glider Sp. z o.o. in Bielsko-Biała (Poland) restarted production of the SZD-59 Acros in 2004. Currently, it is the only unlimited glider in serial production.

== Soaring ==
With a handicap factor of 100, according to the 2008 handicap list of the Deutscher Aero Club e.V., the SZD-59 in 15m-configuration is a typical Club Class glider. With 15m wing-tips with or without winglets glide performance can be enhanced by increasing its wing loading with up to 150 litres of water ballast, but water ballast is not allowed in the 13.2m configuration.

== Aerobatics ==
In the 13.2m configuration, the SZD-59 is certified for unlimited aerobatics, whereas with the 15m wing-tips only basic aerobatic maneuvers (looping, turn, chandelle, spin) are permitted.

While international aerobatic championships in the unlimited category are dominated by Swift S-1 and MDM-1 Fox, pilots have competed successfully with SZD-59 Acros in national and regional championships. Recently, Wolfgang Kasper placed 4th in the German Nationals 2008.

== Specifications in utility configuration ==
Data from , maximum and maneuver speed according to

General characteristics

- Crew: One
- Length: 6.85 m (22 ft 5.69 in)
- Wingspan: 15.00 m (49 ft 2.55 in)
- Height: 1.50 m (4 ft 11.06 in)
- Wing area: 10.66 m^{2} (114.74 sq ft)
- Aspect ratio: 21.01
- Empty weight: 270 kg (595.24 lb)
- Gross weight: 540 kg (1,190.48 lb)

Performance

- Maximum speed: 265 km/h (164.67 mph, 143.09 kn)
- Stall speed: 82 km/h (50.95 mph, 44.27 kn) ^{*}
- g limits: +5.3 / -2.65
- Maximum glide ratio: 40 at 124 km/h^{*}
- Rate of sink: 0.77 m/s (151.57 ft/min) ^{**}
- Maneuver speed: 200 km/h
- Water ballast: 150l
- Wing loading range: 31.00-50.70 kg/m^{2}

^{*} at 540 kg
^{**} at 97 km/h

== Specifications in aerobatic configuration ==
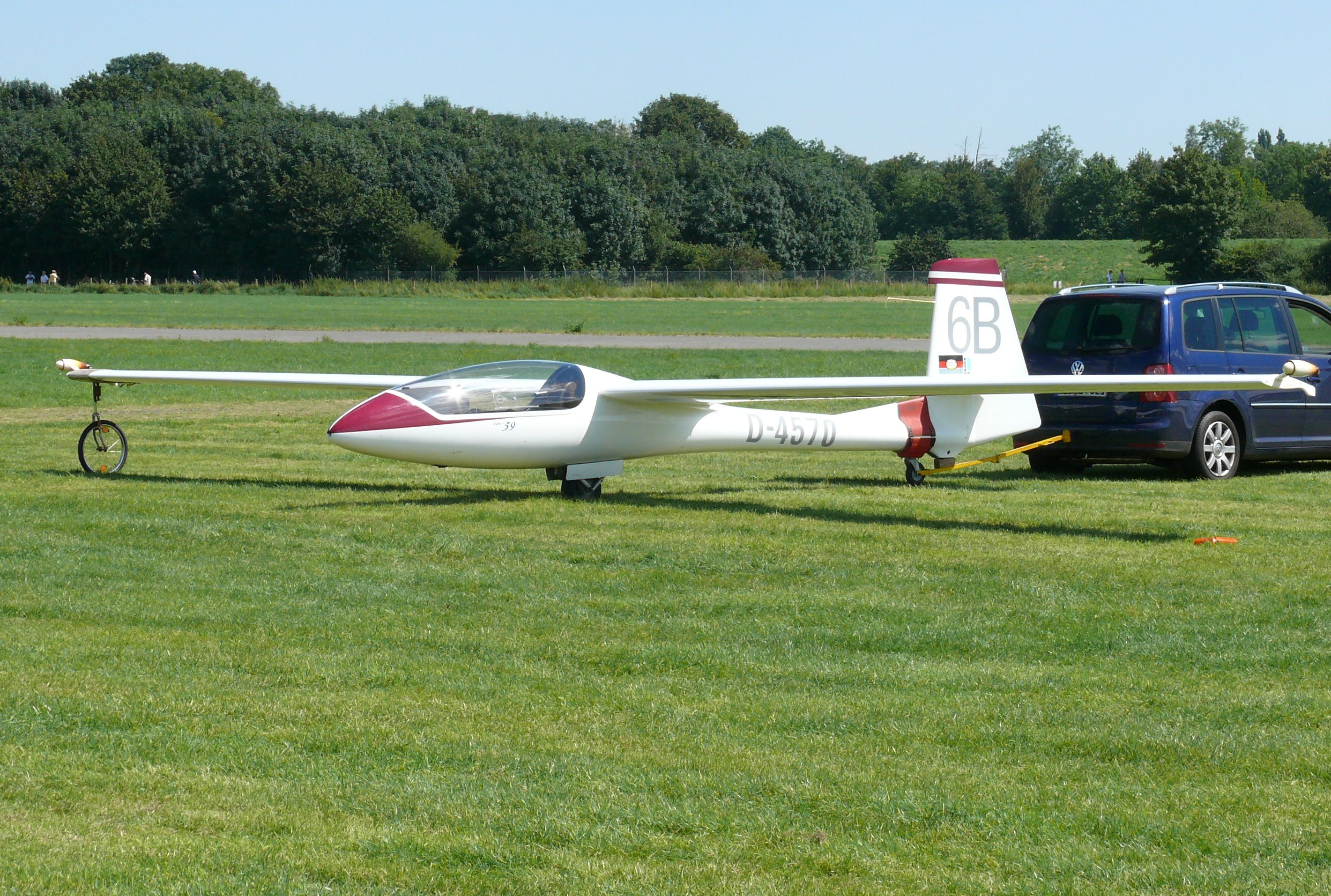
SZD 59 Acro (prototype in 13.2m configuration)

Data from , maximum and maneuver speed according to

General characteristics

- Crew: One
- Length: 6.85 m (22 ft 5.69 in)
- Wingspan: 13.20 m (43 ft 3.69 in)
- Height: 1.50 m (4 ft 11.06 in)
- Wing area: 9.80 m^{2} (105.49 sq ft)
- Aspect ratio: 17.80
- Empty weight: 265 kg (585.22 lb)
- Gross weight: 380 kg (837.75 lb)

Performance

- Maximum speed: 285 km/h (177.10 mph, 153.90 kn)
- Stall speed: 74 km/h (45.98 mph, 39.96 kn) ^{*}
- g limits: +7.00 / -5.00
- Maximum glide ratio: 36 at 115 km/h
- Rate of sink: 0.70 m/s (137.80 ft/min) ^{**}
- Maneuver speed: 200 km/h
- Water ballast: 0l
- Wing loading range: 33.7-38.8 kg/m^{2}

^{*} at 380 kg
^{**} at 80 km/h

== See also ==
=== Comparable aerobatic gliders ===
The aerobatic performance of the SZD-59 13.2m is comparable to:

- Celair GA-1 Celstar
- MDM-1 Fox and Solo-Fox
- Swift S-1
- Cirrus K
- Start & Flug H101 Salto
- Vogt Lo-100

=== Gliders with comparable cross-country performance ===
The soaring performance of the SZD-59 15m is comparable to Schleicher ASW 19, Glaser-Dirks DG-100, Rolladen-Schneider LS1f, Glasflügel H206 Hornet, PZL Bialsko Jantar Standard, Grob G102 Standard Astir, Bölkow Phöbus B3, Schempp-Hirth Cirrus/Cirrus VTC 17,74m, Schempp-Hirth Standard Cirrus 16m, Bölkow Phöbus C1, Akaflieg Darmstadt D37, Akaflieg Braunschweig SB 7, Neukom Elfe 17m, Standard Libelle 17m and the Delphin 1 by Fritz Mahrer.
