= Markus Feyerabend =

German aerobatic pilot

Markus Feyerabend (born 1971) is a German glider aerobatic pilot.

He started gliding in 1987 at the club SFG Weilheim (now: LSV Weilheim-Peißenberg e.V.). Before he obtained his aerobatic rating in 2001, he flew cross-country competitions.

He has been a member of the German national glider aerobatics team since 2005. He was the German National Glider Aerobatics Champion in 2006, 2008 and 2010. In the FAI World Championships in 2007 he won the team silver medal with Olaf Schmidt and Eugen Schaal. In addition, Markus Feyerabend came second in the unknown sequences category in World Championships in 2007 and European Glider Aerobatic Championships 2008. He was placed first by the Deutscher Aeroclub (DAeC) in 2008 in their ranking list of German glider pilots in the unlimited aerobatic category.

For aerobatics he usually flies a Swift S-1.

He works as a systems engineer in a telecommunication company.

== Achievements ==
Achievements in glider aerobatic competitions
| year | contest | location | category | ranking | team ranking |
|---|---|---|---|---|---|
| 2002 | Salzmann-Cup | Kirn, Germany | advanced | 9 | |
| 2003 | Salzmann-Cup | Babenhausen, Hesse, Germany | advanced | 4 | 1 |
| 2003 | Open Hessian Championships | Schwalmstadt-Ziegenhain (Hesse), Germany | advanced | 1 | n/a |
| 2004 | Salzmann-Cup | Nagold, Germany | advanced | 2 | 3 |
| 2004 | German National Championships | Biberach an der Riß, Germany | unlimited | 9 | n/a |
| 2005 | FAI World Championships | Serpukhov (Drakino airfield), Russia | unlimited | 18 (best German) | |
| 2005 | Open Baden-Württembergian Championships | Tannheim, Germany | unlimited | 1 | n/a |
| 2005 | Open Dutch National Championships | Deelen, The Netherlands | unlimited | 1 | n/a |
| 2006 | Salzmann-Cup | Donauwörth, Germany | unlimited | 1 | |
| 2006 | FAI European Championships | Rybnik, Poland | unlimited | 11 | 3 (Schaal-Feyerabend-Schmidt) |
| 2006 | German National Championships | Bad Frankenhausen, Germany | unlimited | 1 | n/a |
| 2007 | Salzmann-Cup | Stölln/Rhinow, Germany | unlimited | 1 | |
| 2007 | FAI World Championships | Niederöblarn, Austria | unlimited | 6 | 2 (Schmidt-Feyerabend-Schaal) |
| 2008 | Salzmann-Cup | Hornberg (Württemberg), Germany | unlimited | 5 | |
| 2008 | German National Championships | Rothenburg (Oberlausitz), Germany | unlimited | 1 | n/a |
| 2008 | FAI European Championships | Radom (Piastów airfield), Poland | unlimited | 3 (best German) | 3 (Feyerabend-Schmidt-Resch) |
| 2009 | German Regional Championships | Pfarrkirchen, Germany | unlimited | 1 | n/a |
| 2009 | World Air Games | Turin, Italy | (similar to) unlimited | 7 | n/a |
| 2010 | German National Championships | Brandenburg, Germany | unlimited | 1 | n/a |
| 2010 | FAI European Championships | Jämijärvi, Finland | unlimited | 8 (best German) | 4 (Feyerabend-Schmidt-Teichmann) |
| 2011 | Salzmann-Cup | Hayingen (Württemberg), Germany | unlimited | 3 | |
| 2011 | German National Championships | Rothenburg (Oberlausitz), Germany | unlimited | 3 | n/a |
| 2011 | FAI World Championships | Toruń, Poland | unlimited | 10 (best German) | 4 (Feyerabend-Teichmann-Schmidt) |
| 2012 | 21st German National Championships | Koblenz-Winningen, Germany | unlimited | 1 | n/a |
| 2012 | FAI World Championships | Dubnica n/Váhom, Slovakia | unlimited | 3 | n/a |

Annotations: Nowadays, the Salzmann-Cup plays a similar role as state championships in Germany, which usually take place as central championships in one federal state. The translations of the names of the German federal state championships ("Landesmeisterschaften" and "Blockmeisterschaften") are not strictly literal. This table contains no rankings in double seater competitions and no rankings in individual disciplines (known, unknown, free). The definition of the advanced category may vary slightly in different glider aerobatic competitions.
