= Edward Margański =

Edward Margański (born September 17, 1943, in Kolbuszowa) is a Polish engineer, aircraft designer and inventor, pilot, founder of the Aviation Equipment Renovation and Production Plant (Polish: Zakłady Remontów i Produkcji Sprzętu Lotnicze) in Bielsko-Biała, currently the aviation company Margański & Mysłowski Aviation Works (Margański & Mysłowski Zakłady Lotnicze). Manufacturer of Swift S-1 and MDM-1 Fox gliders.

== Biography ==
Graduate of the Faculty of Power and Aeronautical Engineering (MEiL) of the Warsaw University of Technology. During his studies in 1962, he reactivated the Student Aviation Section under the name of the Pilots' Scientific Club. He also became the president of the Circle. After graduation, he was an assistant at the Department of Aerodynamics of the Institute of Aviation Technology and Applied Mechanics of the Ministry of Science and Higher Education of the Warsaw University of Technology. In the years 1970–1977, an employee of PZL Mielec, later a representative of PZL Mielec at the Institute of Aviation (IL) in Warsaw. Since 1978, director of the Glider Plant in Bielsko-Biała. In 1986, Edward Margański founded his own aviation company, Zakłady Remontów i Produkcji Sprzętu Lotnicze, in Bielsko-Biała, which produced mainly gliders, now transformed into Margański & Mysłowski Zakłady Lotnicze.

Since 1998, Edward Margański has implemented his own project of a cheap jet aircraft with a composite structure, the EM-10 Bielik (Iskra II), the target successor of the TS-11 Iskra. He is also the designer of the EM-11 Orka sports and business aircraft.

While working on the EM-10 Bielik, he developed a flight control system called "Skrzydełkiem", now patented and tested on models.

He is the father of Małgorzata Margańska, a gliding instructor.
