= Celair GA-1 Celstar =

South African glider

GA-1 Celstar

General information
- Type: Glider
- National origin: South Africa
- Manufacturer: Celair (Pty) Limited
- Designer: Pieter Celliers
- Status: Production completed
- Number built: At least eight

History
- First flight: 1989

The Celair GA-1 Celstar is a South African mid-wing, single-seat, aerobatic glider that was designed by Francois Jordaan and produced by , Celair (Pty) Limited.

== Design and development ==
The GA-1 was especially intended for flying competitive glider aerobatics and the resulting airframe was designed to Joint Aviation Requirements 22 standards and stressed to 10 g.

The aircraft is made from a combination of fibreglass and aramid. Its 11.2 m (36.7 ft) span wing employs a Wortmann FX-71-L-150/25 airfoil. The ailerons are full-span and mass-balanced. Dive brakes are used for approach control.

At least eight were produced, with two exported to Switzerland and six to the United States.

== Operational history ==
In August 2011 there were two GA-1s registered in the US with the Federal Aviation Administration. US-registered aircraft are in the Experimental - Racing/Exhibition category.

== Specifications (GA-1) ==
Data from Sailplane Directory

General characteristics

- Crew: one
- Wingspan: 11.2 m (36 ft 9 in)
- Wing area: 11.54 m^{2} (124.2 sq ft)
- Aspect ratio: 10.9:1
- Airfoil: Wortmann FX-71-L-150/25
- Empty weight: 265 kg (584 lb)
- Gross weight: 385 kg (849 lb)

Performance

- Maximum speed: 324 km/h (201 mph, 175 kn)
- Stall speed: 80 km/h (50 mph, 43 kn)
- g limits: +/-10g
- Maximum glide ratio: 25:1
- Rate of sink: 0.89 m/s (175 ft/min)
- Wing loading: 33.36 kg/m^{2} (6.83 lb/sq ft)

== See also ==
Aircraft of comparable role, configuration, and era

- Allstar SZD-59
- Glasflügel H-101
- Pilatus PC-11 AF
- Swift S-1

Related lists

- List of gliders
