= Łukasz Wójcik =

Polish glider pilot

Łukasz Wójcik is a Polish glider pilot, runner-up in 2012 world gliding championships in 18m class and the runner-up in the Standard Class in 2013 European Championships. He had also won 2008 Polish national championships and placed second in 2009 European.

== Major titles ==
Competition	Venue	Year	Category	Result
European Championships	SLO Nitra	2009	15m	Silver
World Championships	USA Uvalde	2012	18m	Silver
European Championships	POL Ostrów Wielkopolski	2013	Standard Class	Silver
