= Olaf Schmidt =

German glider aerobatic pilot (born 1962)

Olaf Schmidt (born 1962) is a German glider aerobatic pilot.

He joined his gliding club, Bremer Verein für Luftfahrt e.V., at the age of 13, gaining his glider pilot licence at the age of 16 and a glider and his motor glider instructor rating in 1983 at the age of 21. Since 1984, he has assisted at glider aerobatic courses as a tow pilot. He obtained a glider aerobatics rating in 1987. In 1994 he competed in a glider aerobatic competition in the advanced category for the first time. The 1998 German National Championship was his first competition in the unlimited category.

He became a member of the German National Glider Aerobatics Team in 2001. Since then he has competed in the European and in the World Glider Aerobatic Championships.

Achievements in glider aerobatic competitions
year	contest	location	category	ranking	team ranking
1998	German Championships		unlimited		n/a
2000	German Championships		unlimited	8	n/a
2002	German Championships		unlimited	8	n/a
2003	World Championships	Pér, Hungary	unlimited	17	
2004	German Championships	Biberach an der Riß, Germany	unlimited	14	n/a
2004	European Championships	Moravská Třebová, Czech Republic	unlimited	28	
2004	Open Dutch Championships		unlimited	1	n/a
2005	Open British Championships	Vale of Belvoir (Saltby airfield), UK	unlimited	1	n/a
2005	World Championships	Serpukhov (Drakino airfield), Russia	unlimited	28	
2006	German Championships	Bad Frankenhausen, Germany	unlimited	4	n/a
2006	European Championships	Rybnik, Poland	unlimited	13	3 (with Eugen Schaal and Markus Feyerabend)
2006	Open Dutch Championships	Deelen, Netherlands	unlimited	1	n/a
2007	World Championships	Niederöblarn, Austria	unlimited	4 (best German)	2 (with Markus Feyerabend and Eugen Schaal)
2008	German National Championships	Rothenburg (Oberlausitz), Germany	unlimited	2	n/a
2008	European Championships	Radom (Piastów airfield), Poland	unlimited	13	3 (with Markus Feyerabend and Hans-Georg Resch)
