= Rieti Airport =

Airport in Italy

Rieti Airport Aeroporto di Rieti
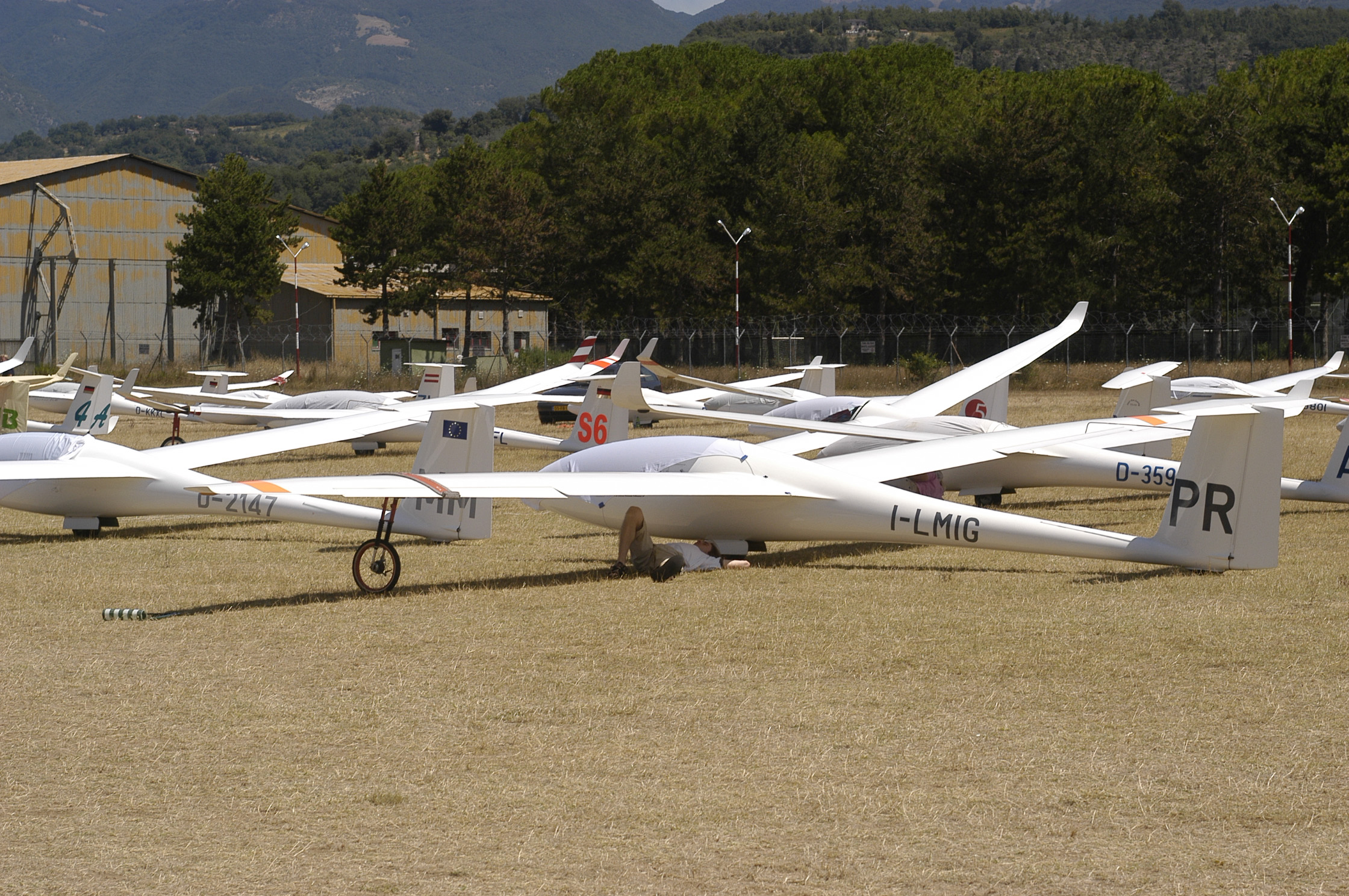
- Gliders at the Rieti Airport
- IATA: none; ICAO: LIQN

Summary
- Airport type: Public
- Operator: Ministry of Transport
- Serves: Rieti, Italy
- Elevation AMSL: 1,278 ft / 390 m
- Coordinates: 42°25′36″N 12°51′00″E

Map
- Location of airport in Italy

Runways
Direction	Length		Surface
Direction	m	ft	Surface
16R/34L	809	2,654	Grass
16L/34R	809	2,654	Grass
- Source: AIP Italia

Rieti Airport (Italian: Aeroporto di Rieti, ICAO: LIQN) is an aerodrome located 1.34 nautical miles (2.48 km; 1.54 mi) northwest of Rieti, a city in the Lazio region in Italy. It is also known as G. Ciuffelli Airport.

The aerodrome is operated by the Ministry of Transport and Navigation and administered by the Italian Civil Aviation Authority (ENAC) of Rome/Ciampino. The air traffic service (ATS) authority is ENAV S.p.A. Prior to 1997 it was a military airport operated by the Italian Air Force.

== Facilities ==
The airport resides in the Rieti Plain, at an elevation of 1,278 feet (390 m) above mean sea level. It has two runways with grass surfaces. The main runway 16R/34L measures 809 by 50 metres (2,654 ft × 164 ft) and is used by aircraft with engines. The secondary runway 16L/34R measures 809 by 40 metres (2,654 ft × 131 ft) and is used by glider aircraft. Operation of ultralight aircraft is restricted to three one-hour time periods each day, during which other air traffic is prohibited.

The airport hosts a helicopter base which, until 2016, was operated by the State Forestry Corps; after the dissolution of the agency, the base is operated by Carabinieri.

The airport also hosts some facilities used by students of Rieti's military school for CBRN defense: the shooting range and the "NUBICH" exercise area.

Air currents in the Rieti Plain are particularly favorable for gliding and offer the best conditions to fly, so the airport is well known among gliders all over the world; it hosted the 1982, 1994 and 2015 editions of the European Gliding Championships.

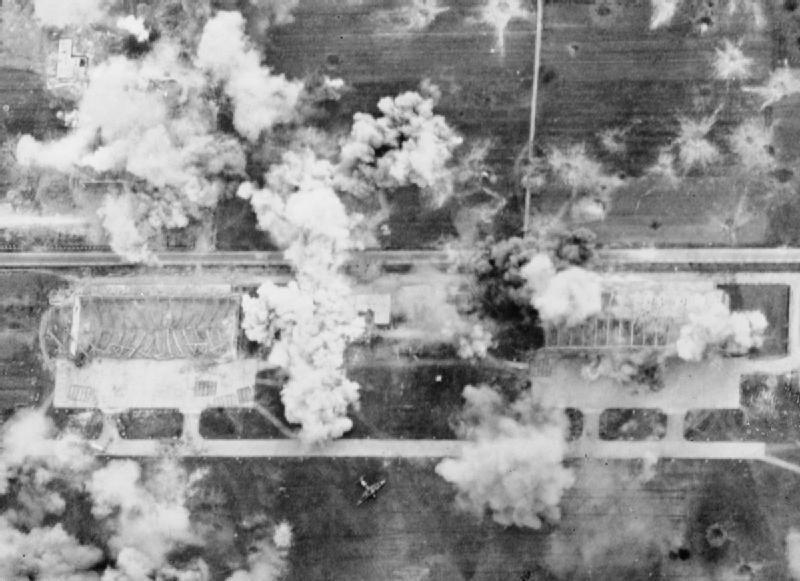
Bombing of the airport by RAF in 1944

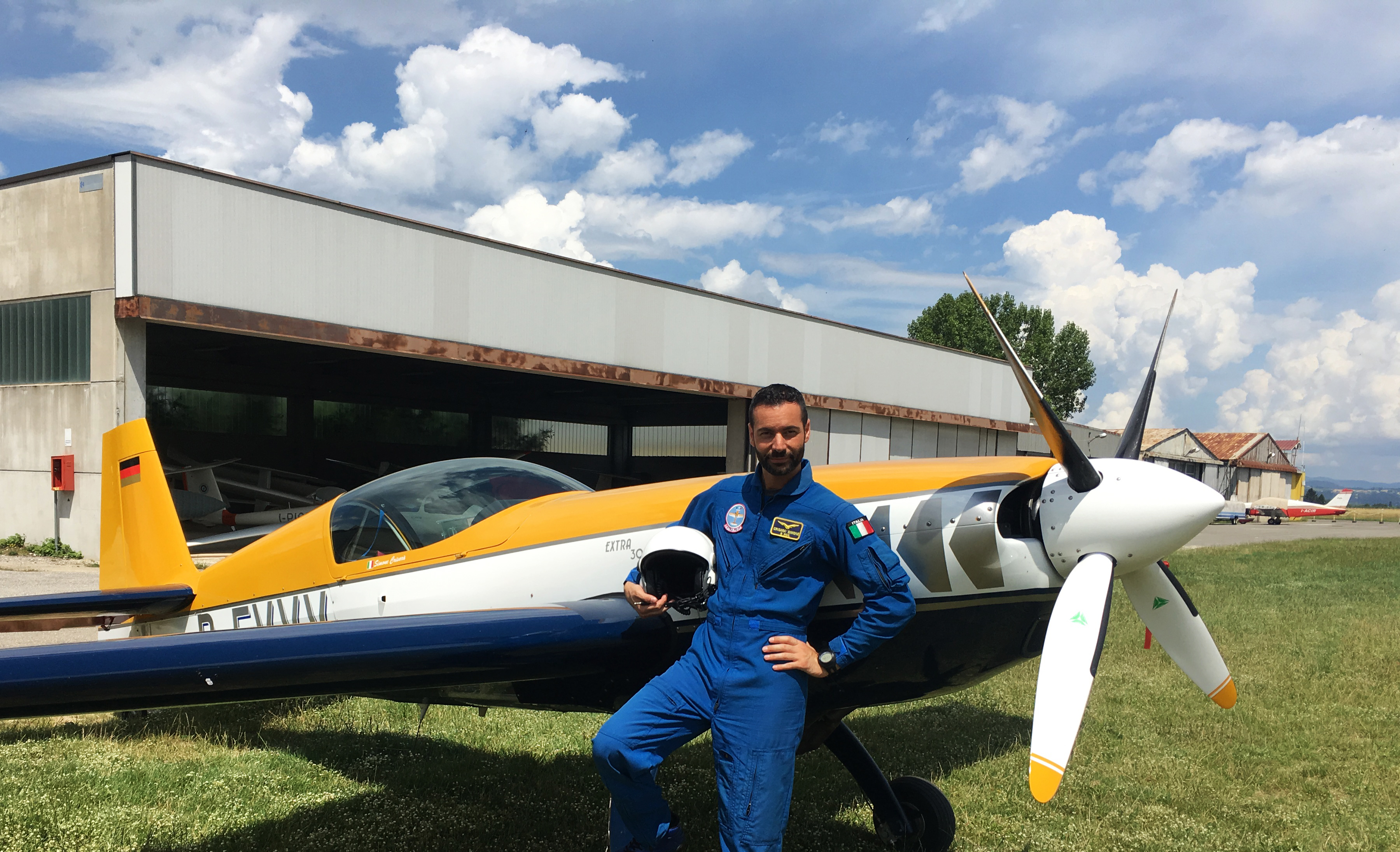
An acrobatic plane at the Rieti airport

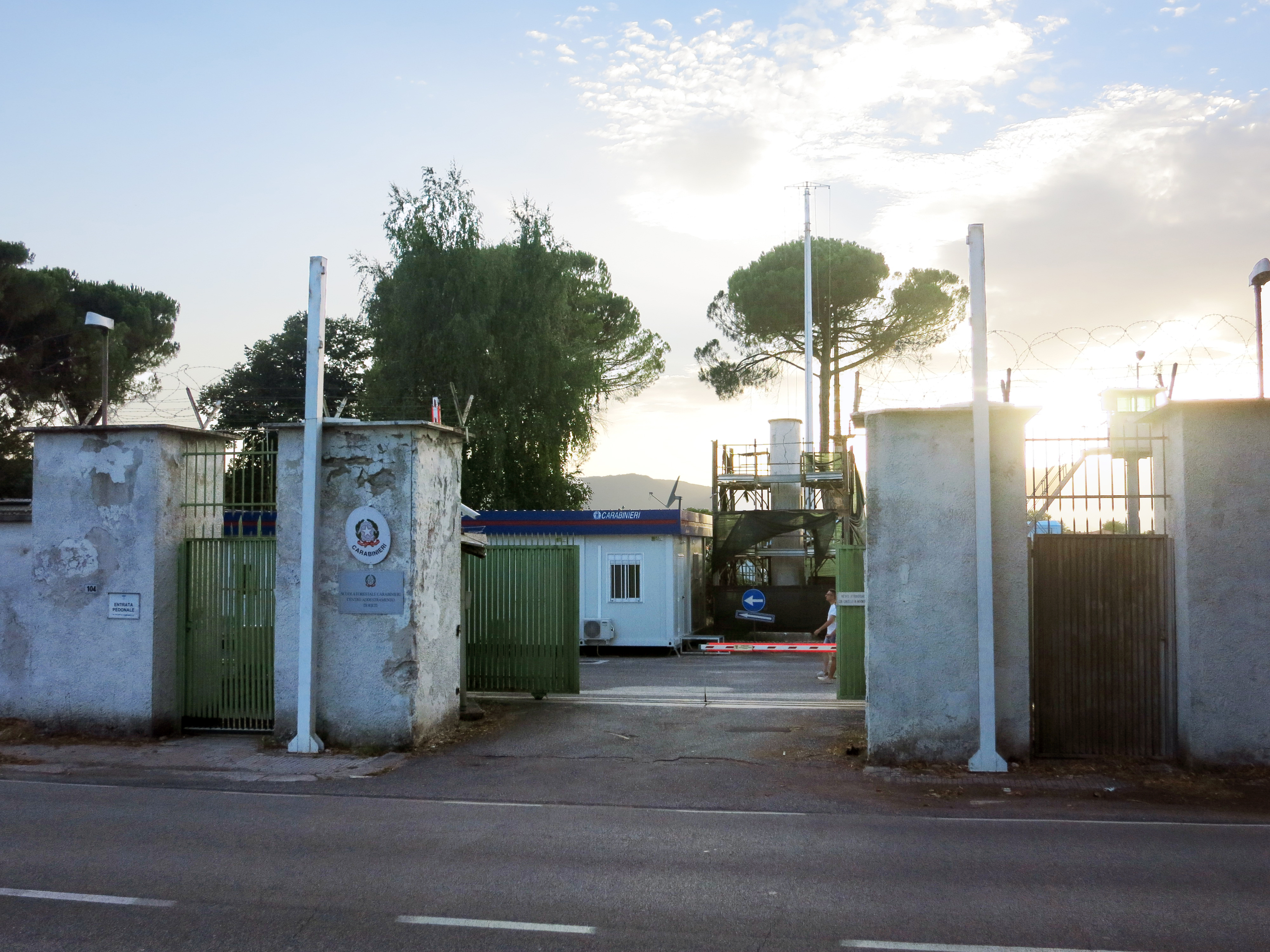
Entrance to the Carabinieri helicopter base

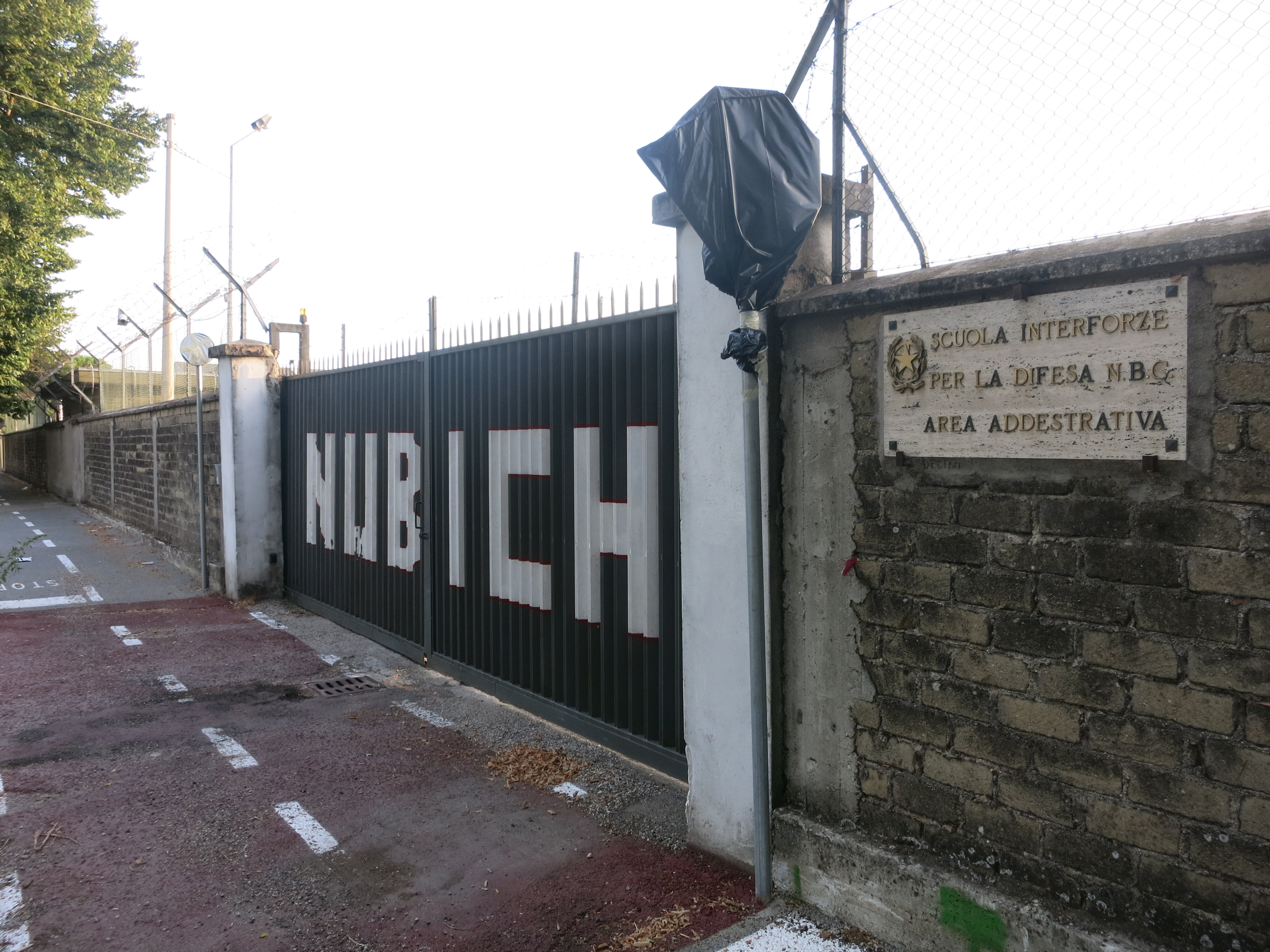
Entrance to Italian Army's "NUBICH" exercise area for CBRN defense

== See also ==
- List of airports in Italy
