= Margański & Mysłowski =

Polish aircraft and glider manufacturer

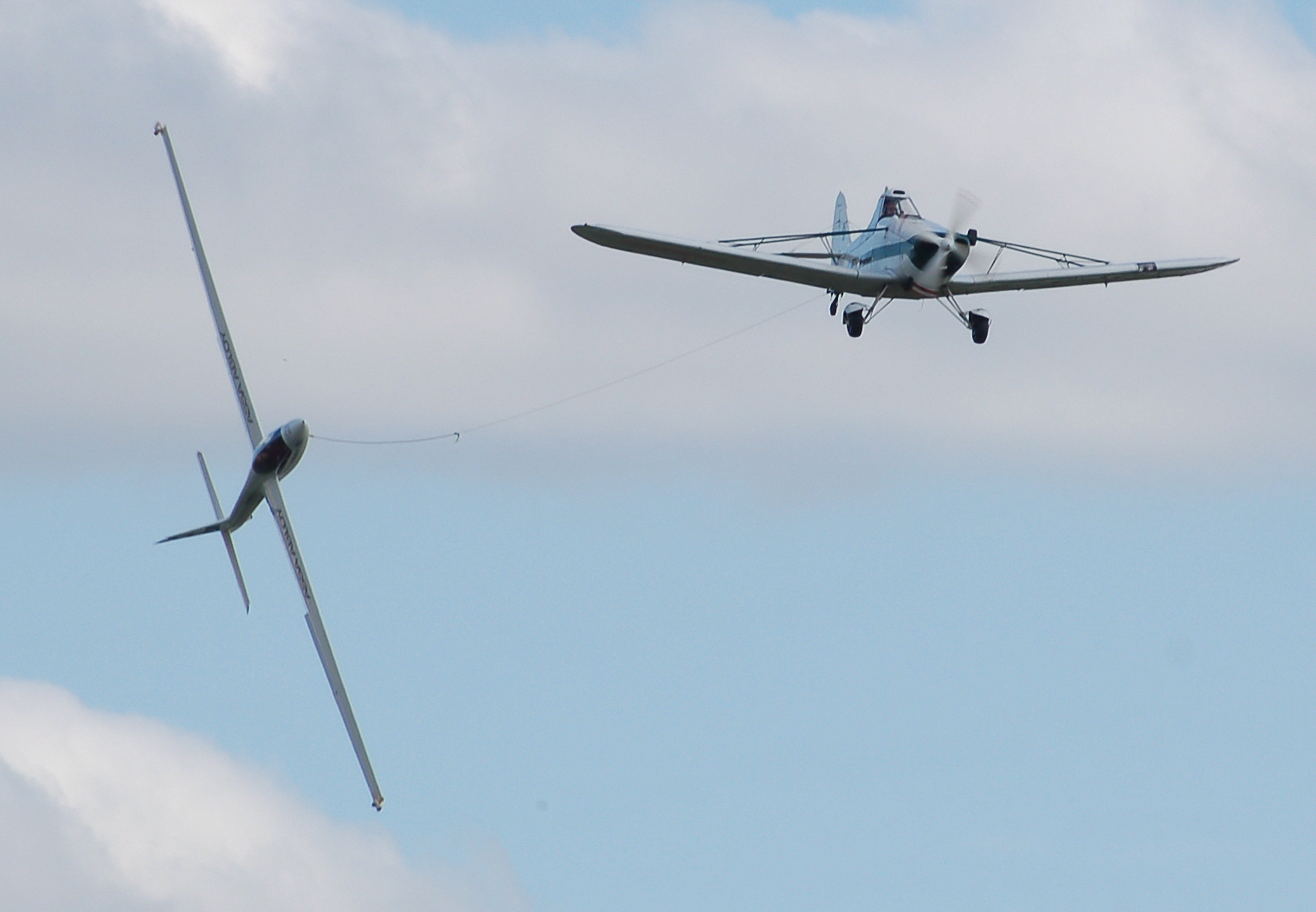
The Swift Aerobatic Display Team at Kemble Battle of Britain Weekend 2009. A Swift S-1 is performing continuous rolls while towed by a Piper Pawnee

Margański & Mysłowski Zakłady Lotnicze (Margański & Mysłowski Aviation Works) is a Polish aircraft and glider manufacturer, located in Bielsko-Biała. It designs and manufactures unlimited category aerobatic gliders and powered aircraft, wind turbines and composite structures.

The company began as Zakład Remontów i Produkcji Sprzętu Lotniczego (ZRiPS, Aviation Equipment Repair and Production Works), created in 1986 by Edward Margański, and became the first privately owned aviation works in communist Poland after World War II. At first it repaired gliders. In the 1990s, it undertook design work and designed gliders for Swift and MDM. The main designer was Edward Margański.

In 2001, the company started work on utility and training aircraft of composite construction and the corporate identity became E. Margański i Wspólnicy (E. Margański & Partners), a limited partnership. In 2005 the corporate identity was again revised to become a limited liability company, Margański and Mysłowski Zakłady Lotnicze Sp. z o.o. In 2011, company's status has been changed to Joint-stock company and its full name has been changed to Zakłady Lotnicze Margański & Mysłowski S.A.

== Designs ==
- Swift S-1 (single-seat aerobatic glider)
- MDM-1 Fox (two-seater aerobatic glider)
- Malgosia (motor Fox)
- Solo-Fox (conversion of the MDM-1 Fox prototype into a single seater)
- EM-10 Bielik (low-cost jet aeroplane for fighter pilot training)
- EM-11 Orka (four-seater touring / executive aircraft)
