= Margański & Mysłowski EM-10 Bielik =

Polish military training aircraft prototype

EM-10 Bielik
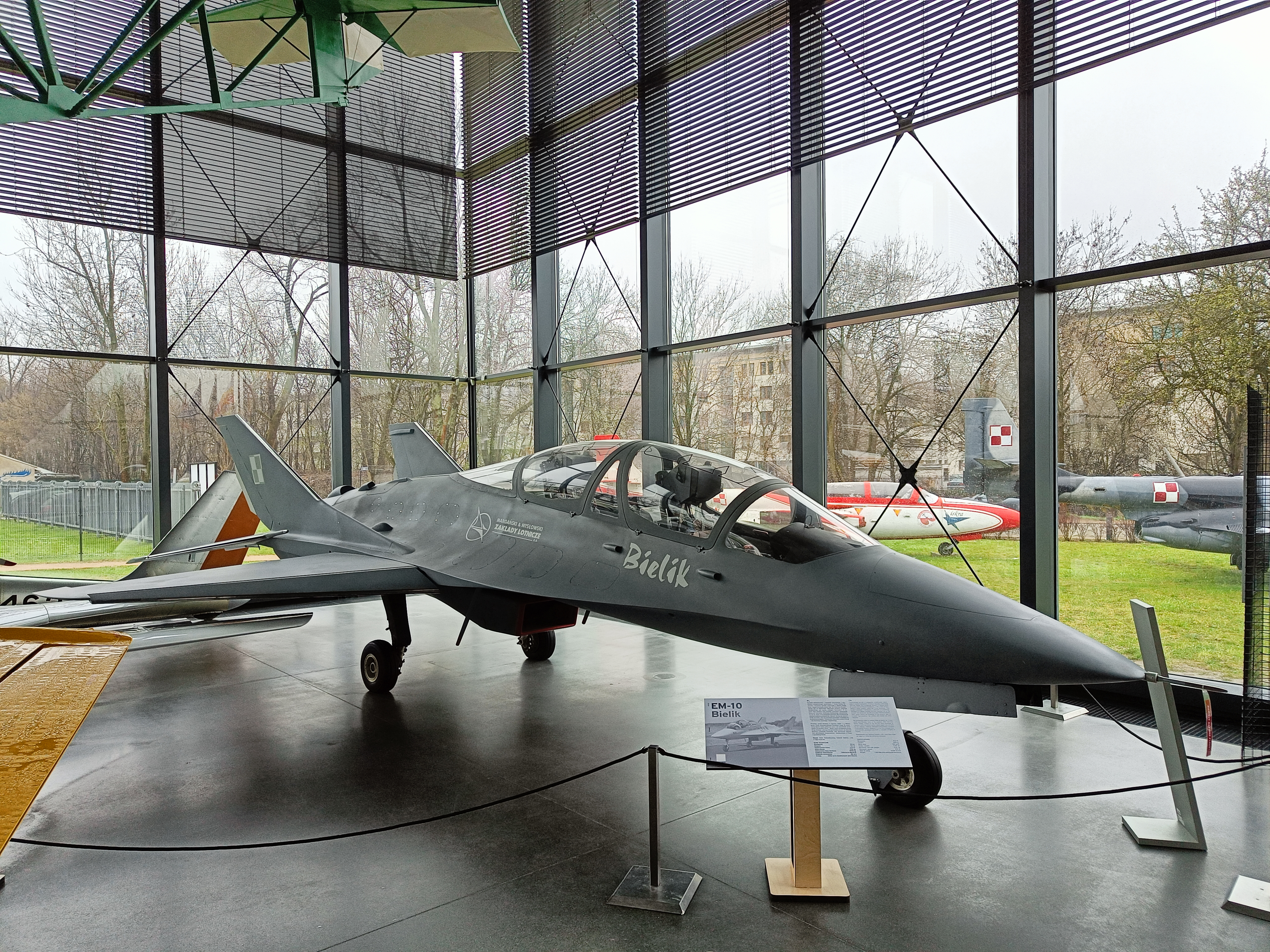
- EM-10 Bielik at Polish Aviation Museum, shown with its right wing attached

General information
- Type: Jet trainer
- National origin: Poland
- Manufacturer: Margański & Mysłowski
- Designer: Edward Margański
- Status: Prototype
- Number built: 1

History
- First flight: 4 June 2003

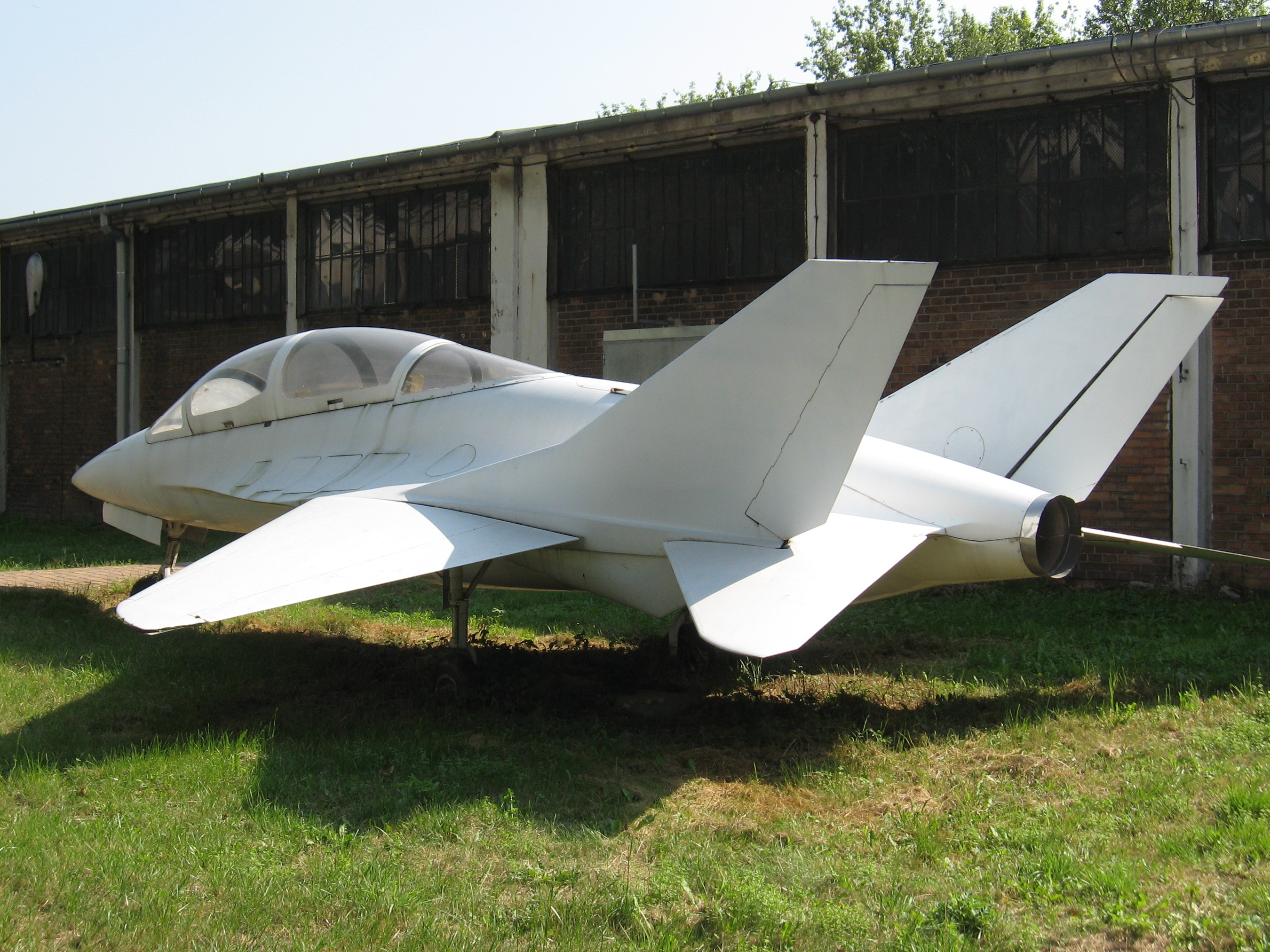
EM-10 Bielik shown with its left wing

The Margański & Mysłowski EM-10 Bielik (English: white-tailed eagle) is a low-cost Polish military training aircraft prototype, built by Margański & Mysłowski Zakłady Lotnicze, and first flown on 4 June 2003. The single-engine aircraft has a composite (mostly carbon fibre) fuselage with a light-alloy aft section, and the pressurized cockpit is fitted with ejection seats.

== Specifications (EM-10 prototype) ==
Data from Jane's all the World's Aircraft 2004-05:

General characteristics

- Crew: 2
- Length: 9.00 m (29 ft 6 in)
- Wingspan: 6.60 m (21 ft 8 in)
- Height: 2.50 m (8 ft 2 in)
- Wing area: 11.90 m^{2} (128.1 sq ft)
- Aspect ratio: 3.7
- Empty weight: 1,700 kg (3,748 lb)
- Max takeoff weight: 2,500 kg (5,512 lb)
- Fuel capacity: 850 kg (1,870 lb)
- Powerplant: 1 × General Electric CJ610-6 turbojet, 13.5 kN (3,000 lbf) thrust prototype; production aircraft 12.75 to 17.65 kN (2,870 to 3,970 lb_{f}) turbojet / turbofan

Performance

- Maximum speed: 1,100 km/h (680 mph, 590 kn)
- Maximum speed: Mach 0.9
- Stall speed: 165 km/h (103 mph, 89 kn)
- Ferry range: 2,500 km (1,600 mi, 1,300 nmi) with auxiliary tanks
- Rate of climb: 45 m/s (8,900 ft/min)
- Wing loading: 210.1 kg/m^{2} (43.0 lb/sq ft)
