= Didier Hauss =

French glider

- Known for: Grand Prix 2014 and European Championships 2015 winner in 15m class
- Relatives: father René Hauss, glider pilot

Didier Hauss is a French glider pilot, World Champion in 2014 and European Champion in 2015.
