= European Gliding Championships 2013 =

17th European Gliding Championships took place in 2013 in Vinon-sur-Verdon, France (8 June – 21 June) and in Ostrów Wielkopolski, Poland (5 July – 20 July).

== Events ==
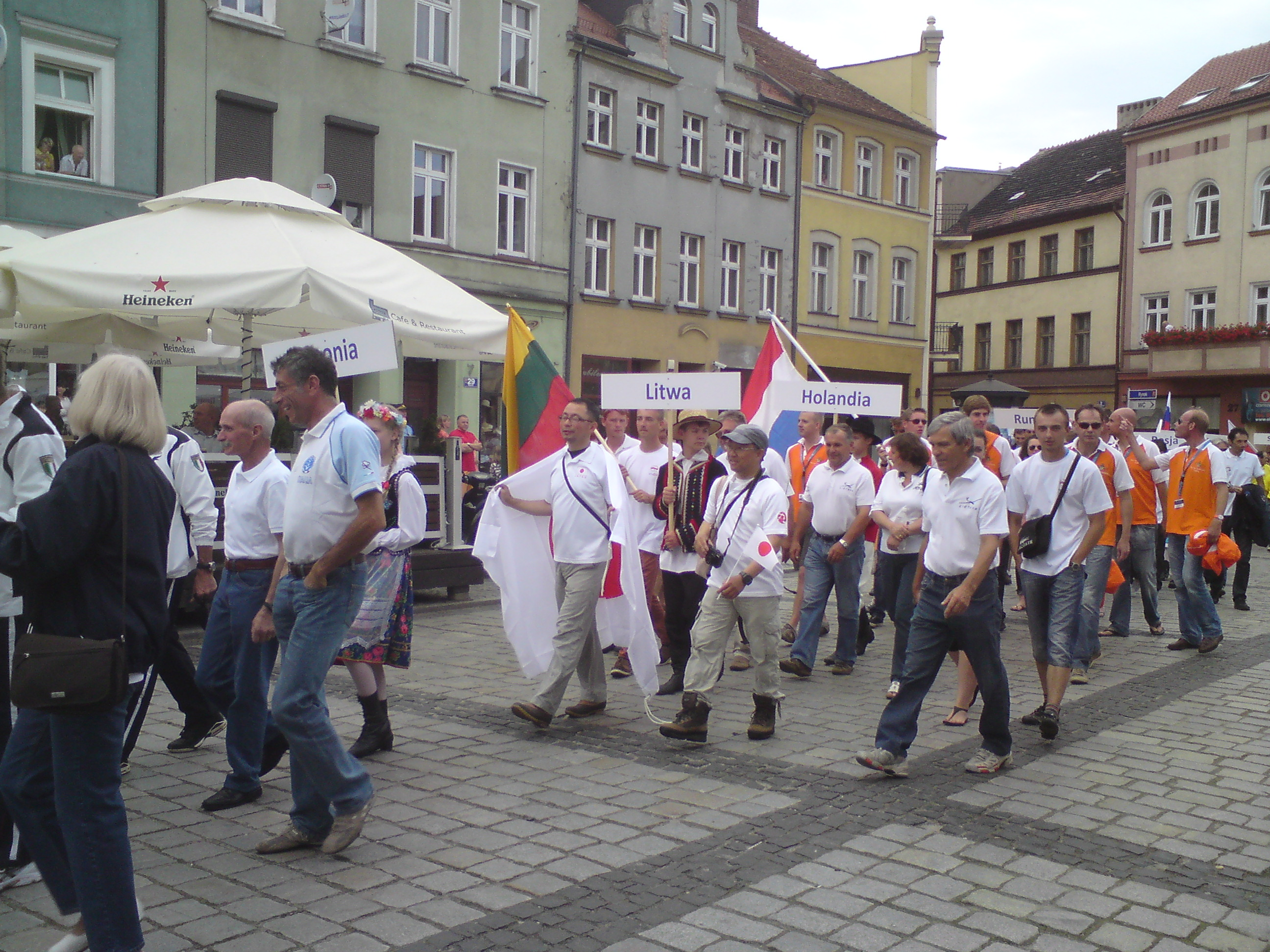
17th European Gliding Championships, Ostrów Wielkopolski, opening ceremony parade.

The 15 meter, 18 meter and Open Class competitions were flown in Vinon-sur-Verdon, the Standard, Club, 20 meter Multi-seat competitions are under way in Ostrów Wielkopolski. World Class competition was cancelled due to insufficient number of entrants.

=== Coverage ===
The Ostrów Wielkopolski site provides a fairly continuous live video coverage of the event at the competition website. There is a twice-a-day commentator reporting. The morning (usually 9:00am UTC) live report is done during the glider launches (in the background) and is focused on the analysis of the previous day competition and a current task. The evening live broadcast (usually 15:00pm UTC) has the glider landings in the background and carries "hot" interviews with freshly arriving pilots, team coaches and other competition participants. During the rest of the time there is live video streaming from the airfield, from professional video crews actively aiming and zooming the cameras at points of interest, so one can watch the airfield events quite closely. Independently, a video recordings of the day (pre-task) briefing (in English) are promptly posted to the competition YouTube channel.

== Results ==
- 15 meter Class Winner: Louis Bourderlique, France; Glider: Ventus 2A
- 18 meter Class Winner: Sebastian Kawa, Poland; Glider: Alexander Schleicher ASG 29
- Open Class Winner: Michael Sommer, Germany; Glider: Binder EB29

== Locations ==
The Vinon-sur-Verdon competition was fought in the mountainous area of Alps. While there are no reports of high altitude wave flying during this competition, most other modes of glider flight were utilized: thermal, ridge/slope, convergence, subinversion wave. Competitors were reporting unusual for the season amount of rain/wet weather.

The Ostrów Wielkopolski races will use the EPOM (village of Michałków) airfield. It is located in a rural setting approximately 5 km NNE of Ostrów proper. The field has a grass surface (no paved runways). Due to prevailing winds most often the 11/29 runway (900m) is used, but the field size (about 1700m x 600m) allows emergency landing in any direction. There are no significant approach obstacles other than occasional pine groves or 2 story buildings, well off main runway axis.

The airfield vicinity is mostly farmland. There is no scheduled air traffic and very little GA activity. The airfield itself commands an on-demand exclusion zone of 10 km radius. For about 50 km more in any direction the airspace is unrestricted (G class) up to FL95. Farther away some controlled airspace areas do exist, but their positions still allow straight line, uncontrolled flights of about 250 km away from the field in most directions.

EPOM is a typical plains terrain gliding center, allowing good thermal flights. There is mostly arable land around, with some small/medium forests. Few water bodies except some wetlands down south. Some industrial (powerplants) thermals are available within daily task range. For July a typical cloudbase is 1200–2000m, with 2 m/s sustained lifts (4 m/s are not uncommon).

The Ostrów/EPOM location is a place of well attended annual gliding competitions "Ostrów Glide" (″Zawody o Puchar Prezydenta Miasta″). (Note: 2012 Quality Factor: 0.6; Rating Points: 960.00) Also, the 4th FAI European Glider Aerobatic Championships (19 July 1998 – 2 August 1998) had been organized there.

== Organizers ==
The Ostrów competitions are organized by Aeroklub Ostrowski – a regional chapter of Aeroklub Polski.

== See also ==
- European Gliding Championships
