= Start + Flug H-101 =

German single-seat aerobatic glider, 1970

H-101 Salto
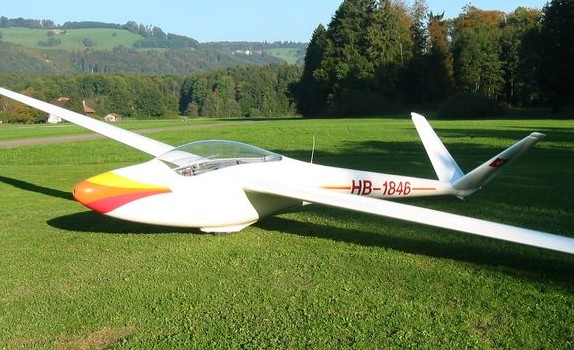
- H101 Salto

General information
- Type: Aerobatic sailplane
- National origin: West Germany
- Manufacturer: Start + Flug
- Designer: Ursula Hänle
- Number built: 72 by 1996

History
- First flight: 6 March 1970
- Developed from: Glasflügel H201

The H-101 Salto ('Loop') is an aerobatic glider of glass composite construction, developed in Germany in the 1970s. Based on the Standard Libelle H-201, it was designed by Ursula Hänle, widow of Eugen Hänle, former Director of Glasflügel. It was first produced by Start + Flug GmbH Saulgau.

== Design and development ==
The H-101 differs from the Libelle in having a V-tail, showing its ancestry to the V-tailed Hütter H-30 GFK. Four flush-fitting air brakes were fitted to the trailing edges of the wings, replacing the more conventionally sited air brakes of the Standard Libelle. The Salto's air brakes are hinged at their midpoints so that half the surface projects above the wing and half below.

The Salto prototype first flew on 6 March 1970, and 67 had been delivered by early 1977, when production at Start + Flug GmbH Saulgau ceased. Five more Saltos were built from 1993 to 1996 by the German company "LTB Frank & Waldenberger", bringing total output of Salto gliders to 72. These Saltos were produced with a 13.6m wingspan.

The Salto was again made available in the late 1980s by Doktor Fiberglas, set up by Ursula Hänle at Westerburg in West Germany as the Hänle H 101 Salto, available in utility and aerobatic versions, with the Utility version available with either short (13.3m) or long-span (15.5m) wings.

== Specifications ==
Data from Jane's World Sailplanes & Motor Gliders,

General characteristics

- Crew: 1
- Length: 5.95 m (19 ft 6 in)
- Wingspan: 13.6 m (44 ft 7 in)
- Height: 0.88 m (2 ft 11 in)
- Wing area: 8.58 m^{2} (92.4 sq ft)
- Aspect ratio: 21.6
- Airfoil: Wortmann FX-66-17-Al 1-182
- Empty weight: 180 kg (397 lb)
- Max takeoff weight: 310 kg (683 lb)

Performance

- Stall speed: 65 km/h (40 mph, 35 kn)
- Never exceed speed: 250 km/h (160 mph, 130 kn)
- Maximum glide ratio: 35
- Rate of sink: 0.6 m/s (120 ft/min) at 75kph (47mph, 40kn)

== See also ==
Aircraft of comparable role, configuration, and era

- Celair GA-1 Celstar
- Pilatus PC-11 AF
- SZD-59 Acro

Related lists

- List of gliders
