= Wilhelm Düerkop =

German glider pilot (1928–2019)

Wilhelm Düerkop (30 June 1928 – 29 September 2019) was a German glider and motor glider aerobatic pilot and promoter of glider aerobatics in Germany for many years. He is known by the nickname Salzmann (meaning "salt man" in German). This is because he was a pit foreman in a salt mine.

== Personal life ==
Wilhelm Düerkop was born in Halberstadt on 30 June 1928. He died on 29 September 2019, at the age of 91.

== Motor glider aerobatics ==
Together with his colleague Hannes Mattes, he performed synchronised motor glider acrobatics using a Fournier RF 4 and an RF 5 at many air shows, until Hannes Mattes died in 2004. Later, Wilhelm Düerkop joined the Skydance-Acro-Team and still performs motor glider aerobatics with an RF 4.

== Promotion of glider aerobatics ==
He owned two Lo 100 gliders a yellow one (christened "Gilb") and a white one, but he now has a modified Schempp-Hirth Cirrus, known as a Cirrus K ("Langohr Eater"). To help promote glider aerobatics, Düerkop lends his gliders to both learners and competition pilots. He sometimes trains advanced learners on aerobatics courses but he especially helps as the tow pilot using his Piper PA-18 "D-ELUF". He has also volunteered at many glider aerobatics events.

=== Cirrus K ===
The modification of a Standard Cirrus into a Cirrus K was initiated by Wilhelm Düerkop in the late 1980s. He still owns the prototype, while the second one is owned by his nephew Wolfgang Seitz.

=== Gilb & Salzlore ===
The Lo100 "Gilb" is now owned by the Förderverein Segelkunstflug im BWLV. It is regularly lent for use on aerobatic courses in Germany.

An ASK 21 that is owned by the glider aerobatics club Fördervereins für Segelkunstflug im BWLV e.V. has been christened "Salzlore", which means "salt lorry" in German, after Wilhelm "Salzmann" Düerkop and the president of the aeroclub of Baden-Württemberg Lore Sturm. This club was founded in 1985 and has about 1250 members.

== Salzmann-Cup ==
Salzmann-Cups (2000 & 2001 Nagoldtal Cup)
year	location	winner (since 2005 unlimited)
2000	Nagold	?
2001	Nagold	Phillipp Hilker
2002	Kirn	?
2003	Babenhausen	Hans-Georg Resch
2004	Nagold	Michael Zistler
2005	Ziegenhain	Wolfgang Kasper
2006	Donauwörth	Markus Feyerabend
2007	Stöll/Rhinow	Markus Feyerabend
2008	Hornberg	Hans-Georg Resch
2009	Michelstadt-Vielbrunn	Klaus Kahler
2010	Kitzingen	Wolfgang Schiek
2011	Hayingen	Hans-Georg Resch

The German club championships in glider aerobatics are named Salzmann-Cup after Wilhelm "Salzmann" Düerkop. There are three classes in each competition: the sportsman class, the advanced class and the unlimited class. The Salzmann-Cup plays a similar role as state championships in Germany. In the unlimited category, it is a qualification contest for joining the national team. A team prize is also presented based on the combined results in all the classes for the pilots of each club. Additionally, the title "Salzmann des Jahres" (Salt Man of the Year) is awarded for unselfish conduct and sportsmanship.

The first club championships took place in Nagold in 2000 and 2001 as "Nagoldtal-Cup", initiated by Michael Zistler. Since 2002, the club championships are organized at different German airfields each year on Corpus Christi day and the following weekend.

During the 2007 event, the Förderverein Kunstflug Aufschwung Ost (regional glider aerobatics club of east Germany) was founded.
