= Räyskälä Airfield =

Räyskälä Airfield Räyskälän lentokenttä
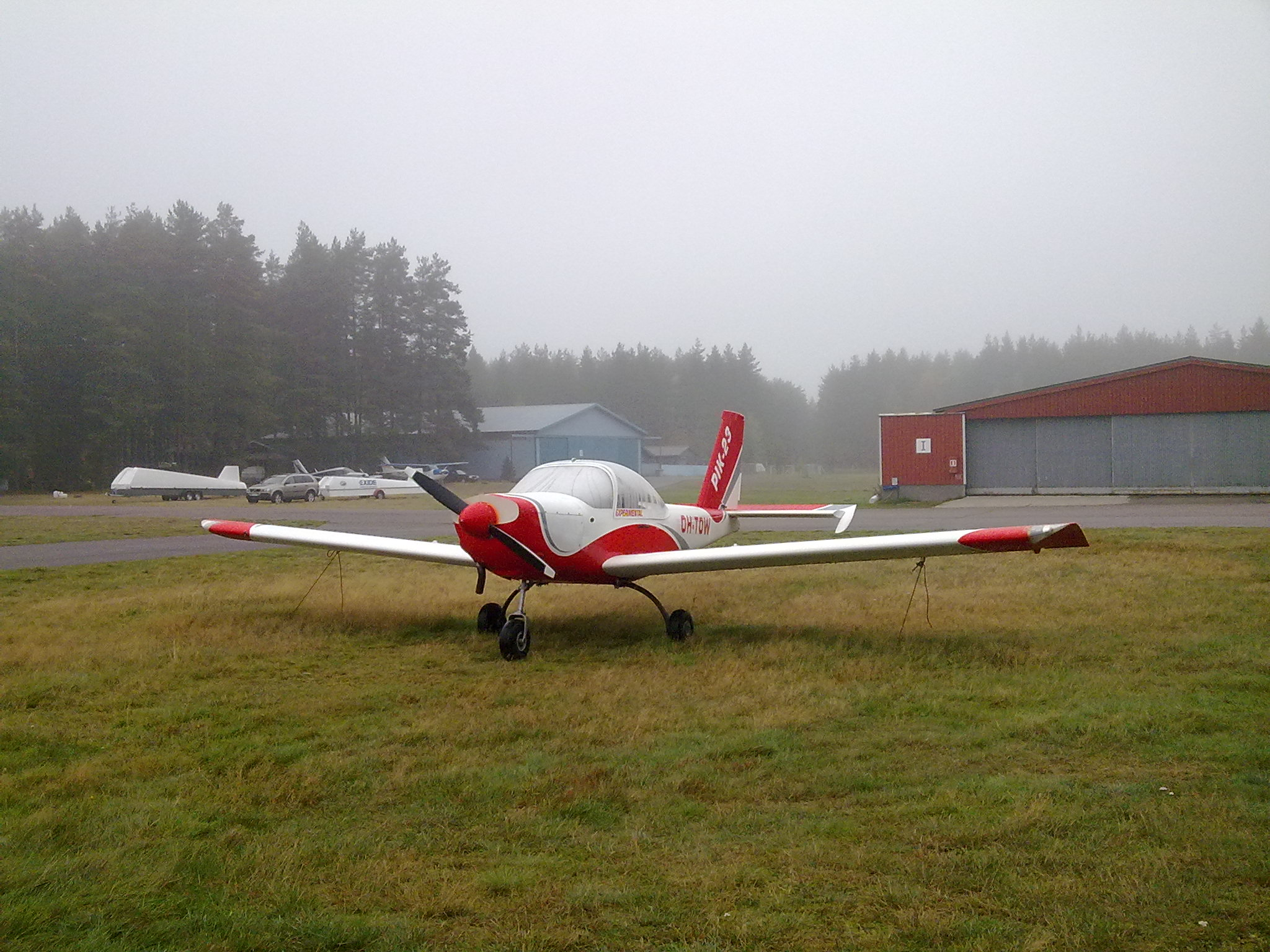
- Pik-23 Towmaster at Räyskälä Airfield
- IATA: none; ICAO: EFRY

Summary
- Operator: Räyskälä-Säätiö
- Location: Räyskälä, Loppi, Finland
- Elevation AMSL: 407 ft (124 m)
- Coordinates: 60°44′41″N 024°06′28″E
- Website: www.rayskala.fi

Map
- Location within Finland

Runways
Direction	Length		Surface
Direction	m	ft	Surface
08L/26R	800	2,625	Asphalt
08R/26L	1,020	3,346	Asphalt/gravel
12L/30R	1,270	4,167	Asphalt/gravel
12R/30L	480	1,575	Asphalt
- Source: VFR Finland

Räyskälä Airfield is an airfield in Räyskälä, Loppi, Finland, about 23 kilometres (14 mi) west of Loppi centre and 37 kilometres (23 mi) east of Forssa town centre. It is the largest sports aviation centre in the Nordic countries, and one of the busiest general aviation airfields in Finland. It is also home to the Finnish Sports Aviation Academy.

Räyskälä Airfield hosted the World Gliding Championships in 1976 and 2014, the Junior World Gliding Championships in 2009, and the European Gliding Championships in 1996 and 2005.

== Accidents and incidents ==
On 16 October 2024, a World War II-era North American T-6 Texan trainer aircraft crashed into a forest near the airfield shortly after takeoff, killing its two German pilots.

== See also ==
- List of airports in Finland
