= Joint Aviation Authorities =

Board of aircraft safety ministries in Europe

The Joint Aviation Authorities (JAA) was an associated body of the European Civil Aviation Conference representing the civil aviation regulatory authorities of a number of European States who had agreed to co-operate in developing and implementing common safety regulatory standards and procedures. It was not a regulatory body, regulation being achieved through the member authorities. It was in existence from 1970 until disbanded in 2009. Its headquarters were located in Hoofddorp near Schiphol airport in Netherlands.

JAA issued the Joint Aviation Requirements (JAR), intended to establish minimum requirements for air safety.

In implementing the so-called FUJA Report, JAA entered into a new phase as of 1 January 2007. In this new phase the former "JAA" became "JAA T" (Transition). JAA T consisted of a Liaison Office (JAA LO) and a Training Office (JAA TO). The offices of JAA LO were located in the premises of the European Union Aviation Safety Agency (EASA) in Cologne, Germany.

== History ==
The JAA started as Joint Airworthiness Authorities in 1970. Original objectives were only to produce common certification codes for large aeroplanes and for engines in order to meet the needs of European industry and international consortia (e.g., Airbus). After 1987, its work was extended to operations, maintenance, licensing and certification/design standards for all classes of aircraft.

The adoption of the Regulation (EC) No 1592/2002 by the European Parliament and the Council of the European Union (EU) and the subsequent establishment of the EASA created a Europe-wide regulatory authority which has absorbed most functions of the JAA (in the EASA Members states). With the introduction of the EASA some non-EU members of the JAA became non-voting members of the EASA, while others were completely excluded from the legislative and executive process. Among the functions transferred is safety and environmental type-certification of aircraft, engines and parts and approval. Additional responsibilities have been subsequently added over time.

In 2009, JAA was disbanded. Only the training organisation, JAA-TO, remains.

== JAA member states ==
=== Non-EU members ===
Candidate members marked with * (as of January 2008)
EFTA countries are members of EASA.

- Albania*
- Azerbaijan*
- Bosnia and Herzegovina
- Georgia
- Iceland (EFTA member)
- Liechtenstein (EFTA member)
- Moldova
- Montenegro*
- Monaco
- North Macedonia
- Norway (EFTA member)
- Serbia*
- Switzerland (EFTA member)
- Turkey
- Ukraine*
- United Kingdom

=== EU members ===
- Austria
- Belgium
- Bulgaria
- Croatia
- Cyprus
- Czech Republic
- Denmark
- Estonia
- Finland
- France
- Germany
- Greece
- Hungary
- Ireland
- Italy
- Latvia
- Lithuania
- Luxembourg
- Malta
- Netherlands
- Poland
- Portugal
- Romania
- Slovakia
- Slovenia
- Spain
- Sweden

== See also ==
- Eurocontrol
- European Union Aviation Safety Agency
- European Civil Aviation Conference
- Federal Aviation Administration
