= Pociūnai (Prienai) =

- Village
- Location in Lithuania
- Coordinates: 54°38′38″N 24°04′01″E
- Country: Lithuania
- County: Kaunas
- Municipality: Prienai
- Eldership: Ašmintos

Population (2011)
  - Total: 53
- Time zone: UTC+2 (EET)
  - Summer (DST): UTC+3 (EEST)

Pociūnai is a village (Lithuanian: kaimas) in the eldership or elderate of Ašmintos, in the Prienai district municipality in Kaunas County, Lithuania. According to the 2011 census, the village had 53 residents.
