= Margański & Mysłowski EM-11 Orka =

EM-11 Orka
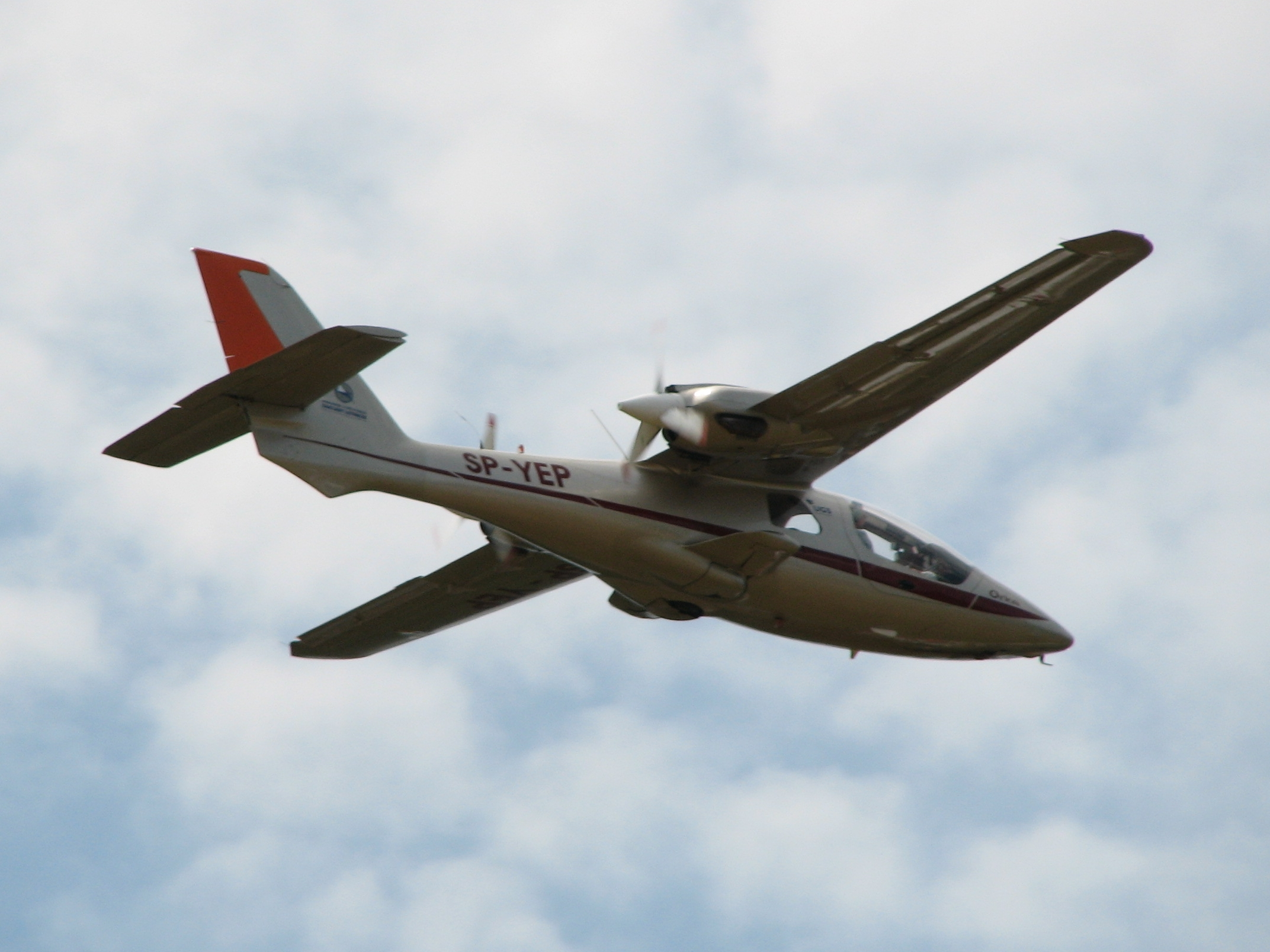
- EM-11C Orka (SP-YEP)

General information
- Type: Utility aircraft
- Manufacturer: Margański & Mysłowski
- Designer: Edward Margański
- Status: entering production, in service

History
- First flight: 8 August 2003

The EM-11 Orka (orca) is a touring and executive aircraft manufactured in Poland.

== History ==
The EM-11 was designed by Edward Margański of Margański & Mysłowski Zakłady Lotnicze (Margański & Mysłowski Aviation Works), who were previously known for their Swift S-1 and MDM-1 Fox sailplanes. Work on this new low cost, light utility aircraft, of unorthodox configuration, with slim glider-like fuselage and two pusher engines, started in 2001 and was constructed of composite materials with a 4-seat cab placed low, for easier boarding. Luggage is stored behind the rear seats. Composite fuselage was a development of sailpane fuselage. As the designer Edward Margański pointed out, his goal was to create flying limousine "for people, not only for pilots", offering good visibility, comfort and ease of boarding. He also expressed that his ambition was always to create beautiful aircraft, and in this field his inspiration was the Let L-200 Morava.

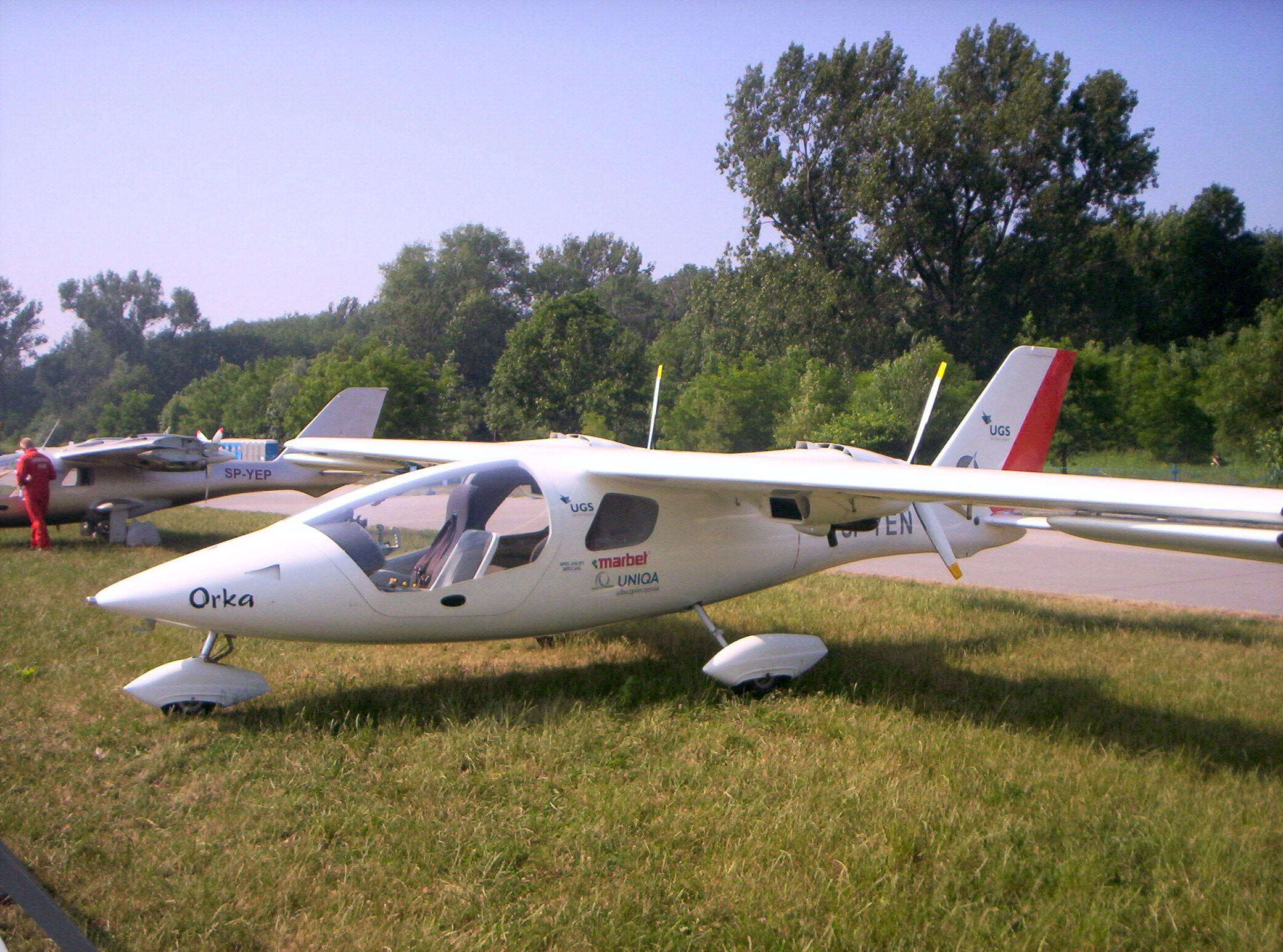
First prototype EM-11 Orka SP-YEN

The first prototype EM-11, registered SP-YEN, flew 8 August 2003. It has a fixed tricycle landing gear and Rotax 912 (100 hp (75 kW)) engines. The second prototype, registered SP-YEP, was to be a pattern for serial production variant EM-11C and flew 20 October 2005 with Lycoming IO-320 engines and retractable landing gear. In April 2011 EM-11C Orka was EASA certified and is currently in production. Prior to certification, two prototypes and three further aircraft had been built.

Several variants are planned, including a patrol aircraft with an FLIR head, an air ambulance, a cargo aircraft, and an amphibious version.

== Specifications ==
Data from

General characteristics

- Crew: One
- Capacity: Three passengers
- Wingspan: 13.4 m (44 ft 0 in)
- Width: 10.5 m (34 ft 5 in) wings folded
- Height: 2.585 m (8 ft 6 in)
- Wing area: 16.5 m^{2} (178 sq ft)
- Max takeoff weight: 1,820 kg (4,012 lb)
- Powerplant: 2 × Lycoming IO-320 4-cylinder air-cooled horizontally-opposed piston engines, 118 kW (158 hp) each
- Propellers: 3-bladed MTV-12 constant-speed pusher propellers LH and RH rotation

Performance

- Maximum speed: 359 km/h (223 mph, 194 kn)
- Cruise speed: 261 km/h (162 mph, 141 kn)
- Stall speed: 109 km/h (68 mph, 59 kn)
- Range: 1,700 km (1,100 mi, 920 nmi) with 45 minutes reserve
- Rate of climb: 5.1 m/s (1,000 ft/min)
