= Pociūnai Airfield =

Pociūnai Airfield Pociūnų aerodromas
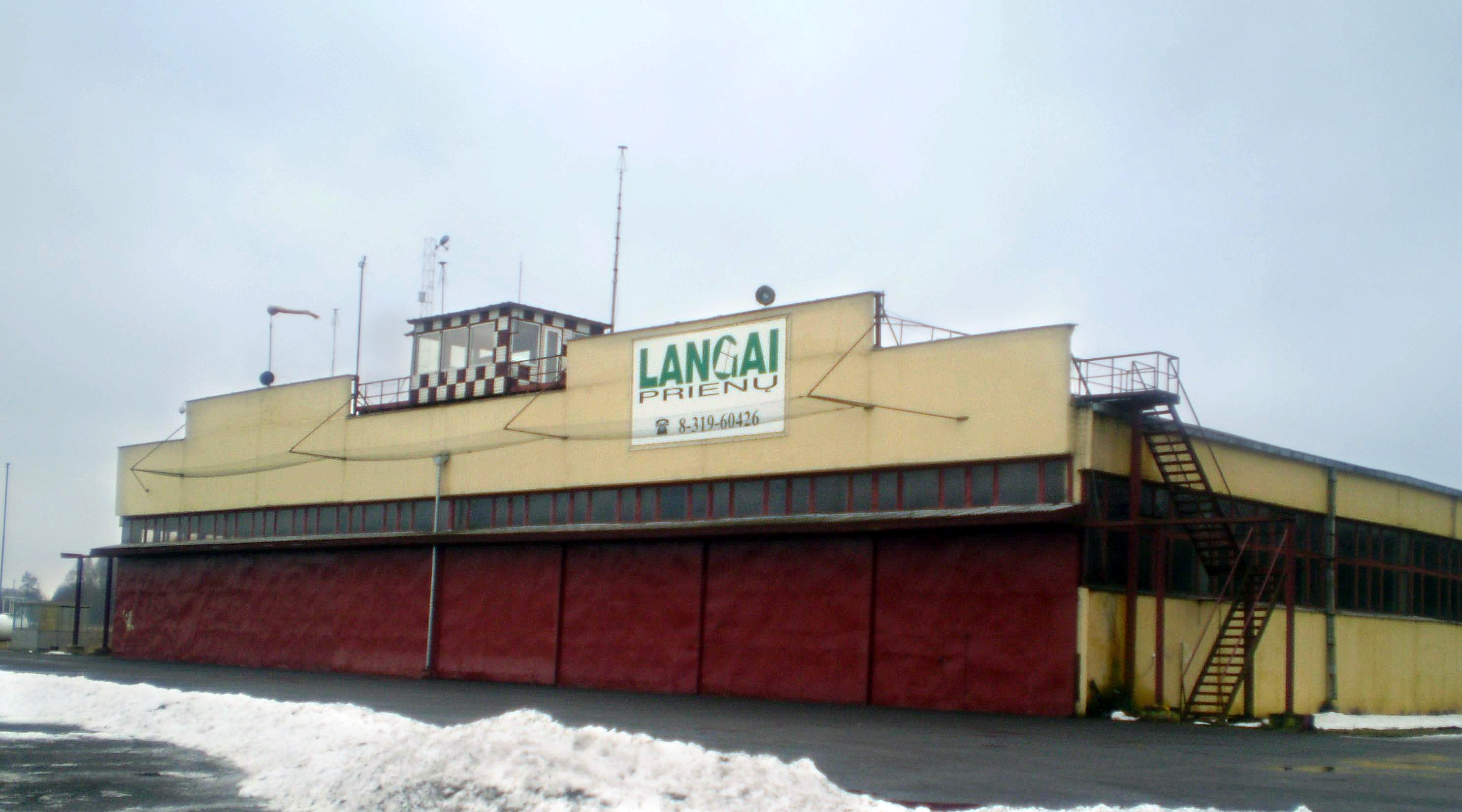
- IATA: none; ICAO: EYPR

Summary
- Airport type: Public
- Owner/Operator: Prienai District Municipality (owner); Kaunas Skydiving Club (operator)
- Location: Prienai, Lithuania
- Time zone: {{{timezone}}} (UTC+2)
- Coordinates: 54°39.3′N 024°03.5′E
- Website: www.pociunai.lt
- Interactive map of Pociūnai Airfield

Pociūnai Airfield (ICAO: EYPR), also known as Prienai Airfield, is a recreational aerodrome located in Ašminta elderate of Kaunas district municipality, Lithuania; 38 km south of the Kaunas City centre. The airport's infrastructure allows it to handle medium and small sized aircraft, up to the size of the Saab 2000, Saab 340.

== Civil aviation organizations ==
- Kaunas Skydiving Club
- AB Sportinė aviacija
- UAB Termikas
- Kaunas Gliding Club (KGC)
- Prienai Air Club

== Civil aviation clubs ==
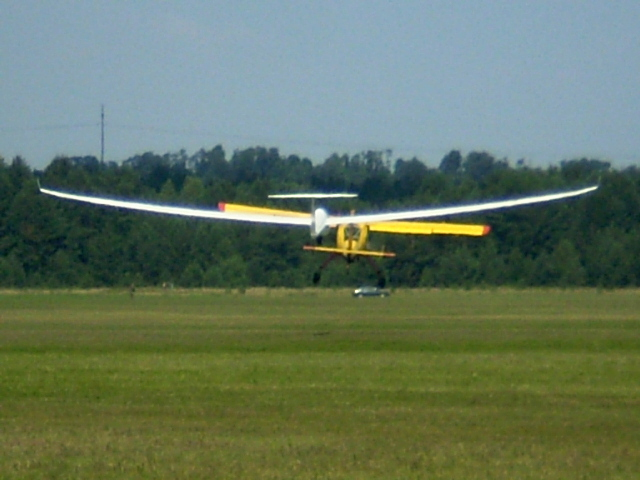
Glider in Pociūnai Airport

Pociūnai Airfield is home base of Kaunas Gliding Club.

Aeroplane sports department of KGC separated and became an independent aeroplane sports club which was located in Pociūnai as well in 1975. Kaunas ASK started organizing Gliding championships of USSR, international gliding competitions. Pociūnai became the centre of Lithuanian gliding.

== Sport activities ==
International gliding championships have been held at Pociūnai Airfield since 2001, when it hosted the first World Women's Gliding Championships. The airfield subsequently hosted the European Men's Gliding Championships in 2004, 2007, 2009 and 2011; the first World Gliding Championships in the 13.5-metre class in 2015; the 34th World Gliding Championships in 2016; the 10th World Junior Gliding Championships in 2017; and the 5th European Junior Gliding Championships in 2021. In 2022, Pociūnai hosted the 21st European Gliding Championships and the 4th World Gliding Championships in the 13.5-metre class.

Parachuting training sessions, camps and sporting events are held at Pociūnai Airfield since mid 1970s. In 2024, the airfield hosted a Formation Skydiving (FS) skills development camp, during which group jumps were conducted, including formations of four, six, and eight or more skydivers.
