= Vinon-sur-Verdon =

Vinon-sur-Verdon Vinon de Verdon (Occitan)
- Commune
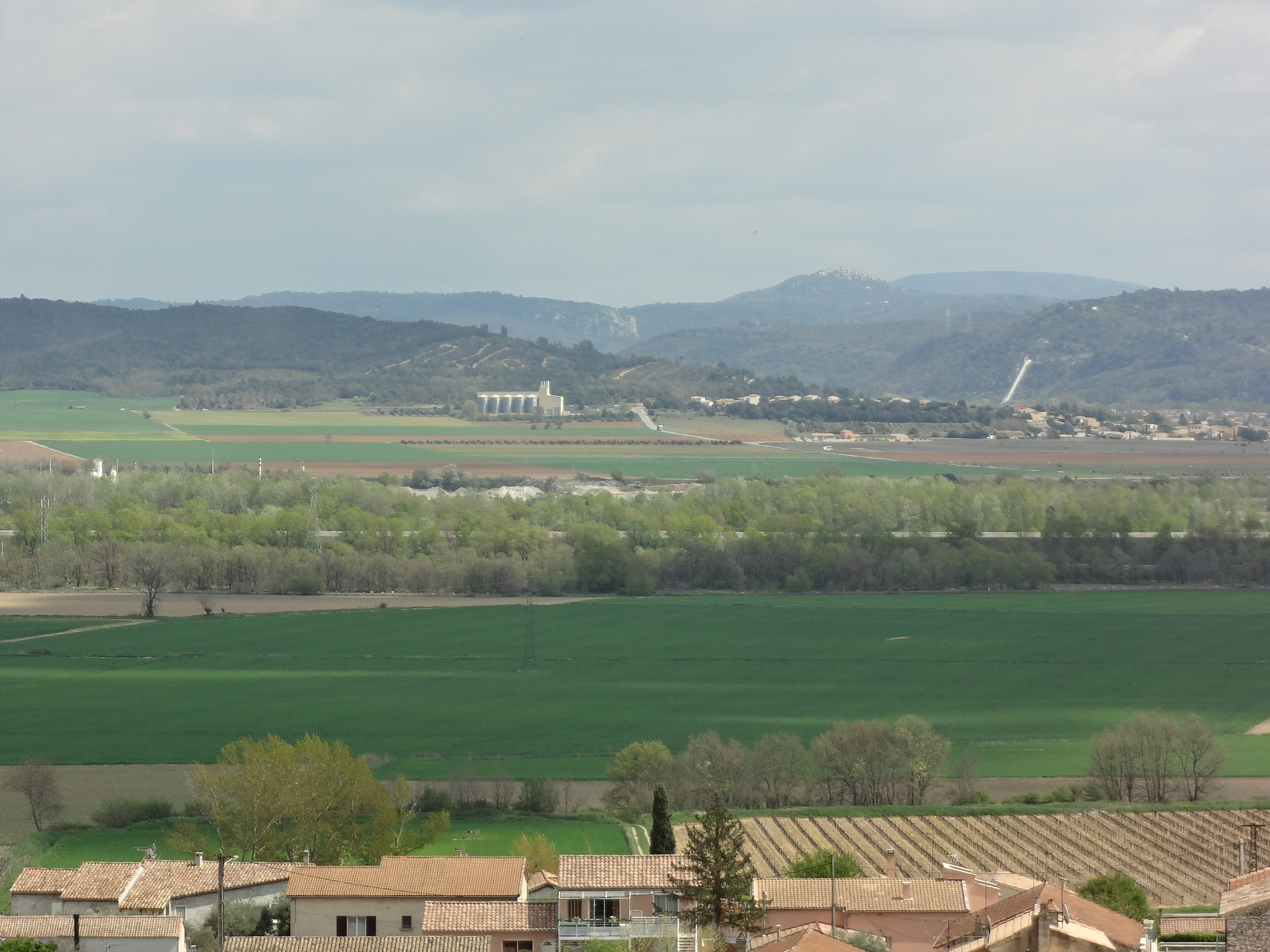
- The agricultural cooperative in Vinon-sur-Verdon

- Coat of arms
- Location of Vinon-sur-Verdon
- Location within France Location within Provence-Alpes-Côte d'Azur
- Coordinates: 43°43′32″N 5°48′45″E
- Country: France
- Region: Provence-Alpes-Côte d'Azur
- Department: Var
- Arrondissement: Brignoles
- Canton: Saint-Maximin-la-Sainte-Baume
- Intercommunality: Durance-Luberon-Verdon Agglomération

Government
  - Mayor (2020–2026): Claude Cheilan
- Area^{1}: 36 km^{2} (14 sq mi)
- Elevation: 285 m (935 ft)
- Highest elevation: 450 m (1,480 ft)
- Lowest elevation: 254 m (833 ft)
- Population (2023): 4,464
  - Density: 120/km^{2} (320/sq mi)
- Time zone: UTC+01:00 (CET)
  - Summer (DST): UTC+02:00 (CEST)
- INSEE/Postal code: 83150 /83560
- ^{1} French Land Register data, which excludes lakes, ponds, glaciers > 1 km^{2} (0.386 sq mi or 247 acres) and river estuaries.

Vinon-sur-Verdon (French pronunciation: [vinɔ̃ syʁ vɛʁdɔ̃]; Occitan: Vinon de Verdon) is a commune in the northwestern part of the Var department in the Provence-Alpes-Côte d'Azur region in Southeastern France. The town is on the left bank of the river Verdon near the Gorges du Verdon. The commune is on the departmental border with Vaucluse and Alpes-de-Haute-Provence.

Vinon-sur-Verdon's airfield (ICAO Airport Code LFNF) is a popular location for the sport of gliding and was the location for the 2006 World Gliding Championships.

During WW2, the bridge crossing the Verdon at Vinon was unsuccessfully bombed by the USAF to prevent the German retreat, leading to significant civilian casualties. It was eventually destroyed by local résistants.

== Geography ==
=== Climate ===
Vinon-sur-Verdon has a hot-summer Mediterranean climate (Köppen climate classification Csa). The average annual temperature in Vinon-sur-Verdon is 13.4 °C (56.1 °F). The average annual rainfall is 607.5 mm (23.92 in) with November as the wettest month. The temperatures are highest on average in July, at around 23.1 °C (73.6 °F), and lowest in January, at around 4.8 °C (40.6 °F). The highest temperature ever recorded in Vinon-sur-Verdon was 44.3 °C (111.7 °F) on 28 June 2019; the coldest temperature ever recorded was −13.5 °C (7.7 °F) on 12 February 2012.

Climate data for Vinon-sur-Verdon (1991−2020 normals, extremes 2002−present)
Month	Jan	Feb	Mar	Apr	May	Jun	Jul	Aug	Sep	Oct	Nov	Dec	Year
Record high °C (°F)	22.4 (72.3)	24.2 (75.6)	26.2 (79.2)	29.9 (85.8)	33.4 (92.1)	44.3 (111.7)	38.8 (101.8)	40.7 (105.3)	35.0 (95.0)	31.0 (87.8)	24.1 (75.4)	21.7 (71.1)	44.3 (111.7)
Mean daily maximum °C (°F)	10.9 (51.6)	12.4 (54.3)	16.3 (61.3)	19.7 (67.5)	23.6 (74.5)	28.9 (84.0)	32.2 (90.0)	31.6 (88.9)	26.7 (80.1)	21.2 (70.2)	15.3 (59.5)	11.3 (52.3)	20.8 (69.4)
Daily mean °C (°F)	4.8 (40.6)	5.5 (41.9)	8.8 (47.8)	12.3 (54.1)	16.0 (60.8)	20.5 (68.9)	23.1 (73.6)	22.5 (72.5)	18.6 (65.5)	14.3 (57.7)	9.3 (48.7)	5.4 (41.7)	13.4 (56.1)
Mean daily minimum °C (°F)	−1.3 (29.7)	−1.3 (29.7)	1.4 (34.5)	4.9 (40.8)	8.3 (46.9)	12.1 (53.8)	14.0 (57.2)	13.4 (56.1)	10.5 (50.9)	7.4 (45.3)	3.3 (37.9)	−0.5 (31.1)	6.0 (42.8)
Record low °C (°F)	−12.0 (10.4)	−13.5 (7.7)	−12.9 (8.8)	−6.3 (20.7)	−0.7 (30.7)	0.9 (33.6)	6.9 (44.4)	5.0 (41.0)	0.2 (32.4)	−5.3 (22.5)	−8.3 (17.1)	−12.3 (9.9)	−13.5 (7.7)
Average precipitation mm (inches)	41.7 (1.64)	31.6 (1.24)	40.5 (1.59)	52.5 (2.07)	51.3 (2.02)	48.6 (1.91)	23.1 (0.91)	31.5 (1.24)	53.6 (2.11)	86.7 (3.41)	88.3 (3.48)	58.1 (2.29)	607.5 (23.92)
Average precipitation days (≥ 1.0 mm)	5.5	5.1	5.4	6.6	6.1	4.4	2.4	3.2	4.9	5.8	7.6	6.4	63.4
Source: Météo-France

== Population ==
Historical population
Year	Pop.	±% p.a.
1968	1,672	—
1975	1,832	+1.31%
1982	2,196	+2.62%
1990	2,752	+2.86%
1999	2,992	+0.93%
2007	3,840	+3.17%
2012	4,199	+1.80%
2017	4,233	+0.16%
2023	4,464	+0.89%
Source: INSEE

== See also ==
- Communes of the Var department
