= Joint Aviation Requirements =

The Joint Aviation Requirements (JAR) were a set of common comprehensive and detailed aviation requirement issued by the Joint Aviation Authorities, intended to minimise Type Certification problems on joint ventures, and also to facilitate the export and import of aviation products.

They were recognised by the civil aviation authorities of participating countries as an acceptable basis for showing compliance with their national airworthiness codes.

The European Aviation Safety Agency (EASA) was created in 2003 and reached full functionality in 2008, and has since taken over most of the JAA functions. JAA Certification Specifications, formerly known as JARs, are recognised by EASA as an acceptable basis for showing compliance with their national airworthiness codes.

== See also ==
- Federal Aviation Regulations
