= Swift S-1 =

Aerobatic glider (first flight 1991)

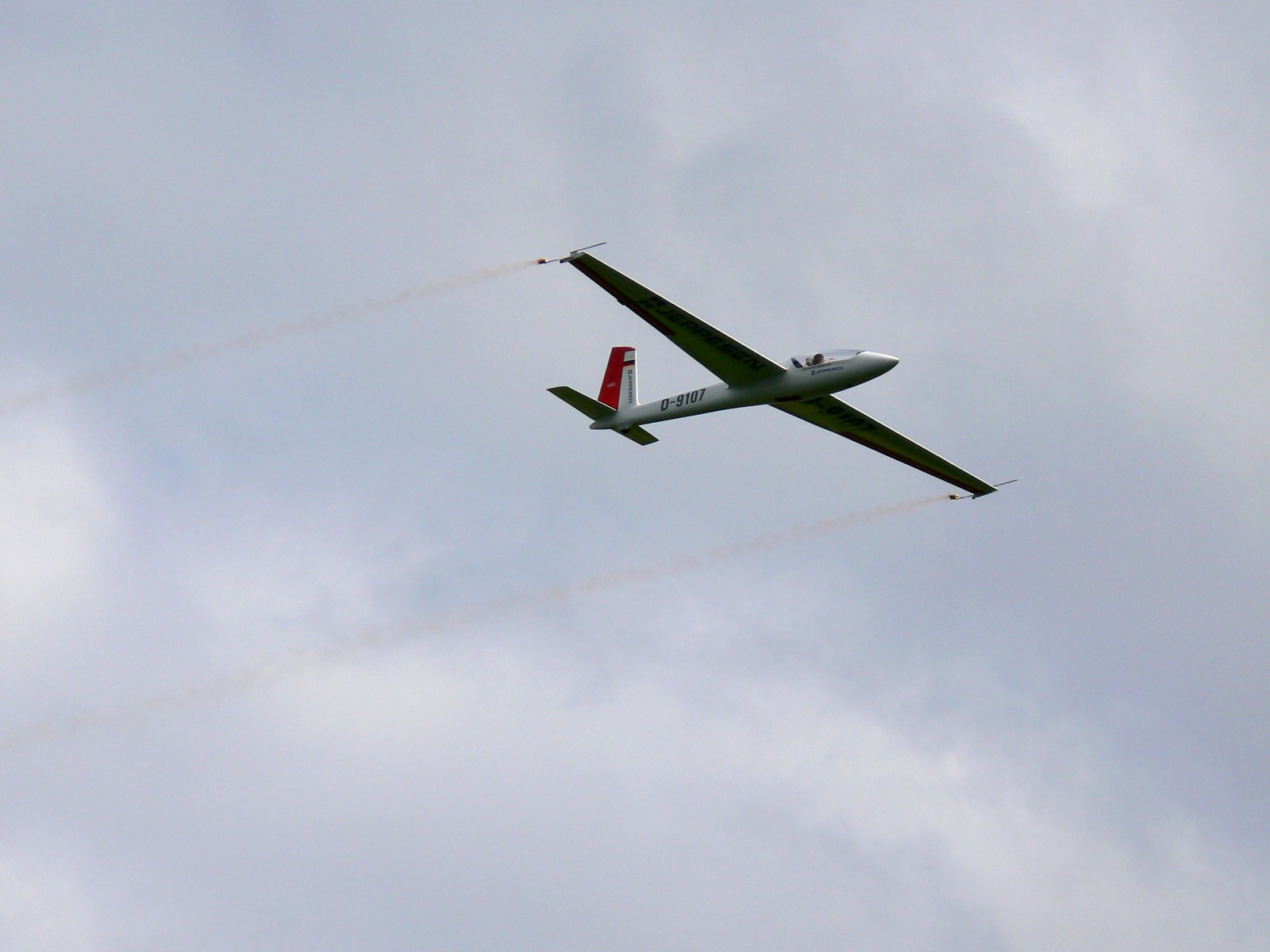

General information
- Type: Aerobatic glider
- Manufacturer: Swift Ltd.
- Designer: Edward Marganski and Jerzy Cisowski
- Primary users: Jerzy Makula see European and World Glider Aerobatic Championships for further users
- Number built: 30 (+ proof of concept glider)

History
- Manufactured: 1991–1997
- First flight: 6 August 1991 (proof of concept glider: 11 January 1991)
- Developed from: SZD-21 Kobuz

The Swift S-1 is a single seat aerobatic glider manufactured by Polish company Swift Ltd.

== Design and development ==
Edward Margański, Jerzy Cisowski and Jerzy Makula developed the Swift at Bielsko-Biała from the SZD-21-2b Kobuz 3. The prototype first flew in 1991.

The glider is made of glass-fibre epoxy composite. It is very strong (stressed for plus and minus 10g) and manoeuvrable (a roll takes less than 4 seconds). Larger tips to increase the span to 15m were designed but not made. It has a retractable undercarriage.

== Specifications ==
Data from

General characteristics

- Crew: 1
- Length: 6.91 m (22 ft 8 in)
- Wingspan: 12.7 m (41 ft 8 in)
- Wing area: 11.8 m^{2} (127 sq ft)
- Tailplane area: 1.65 m^{2} (17.8 sq ft)
- Fin area: 0.9 m^{2} (9.7 sq ft)
- Aspect ratio: 14.3
- Airfoil: NACA 64_{1}412
- Tailplane airfoil: NACA 63_{1}012-63006
- Fin airfoil: NACA 63_{2}015-63012
- Empty weight: 280 kg (617 lb)
- Gross weight: 390 kg (860 lb)

Performance

- Never exceed speed: 320 km/h (200 mph, 170 kn) diving
- Maximum manoeuvring speed: 228 km/h (142 mph; 123 kn)
- g limits: +10 g / - 7.5 g
- Maximum glide ratio: 30:1 at 107 km/h (66 mph; 58 kn)
- Rate of sink: 0.9 m/s (180 ft/min)

== Gallery ==
Swift S-1
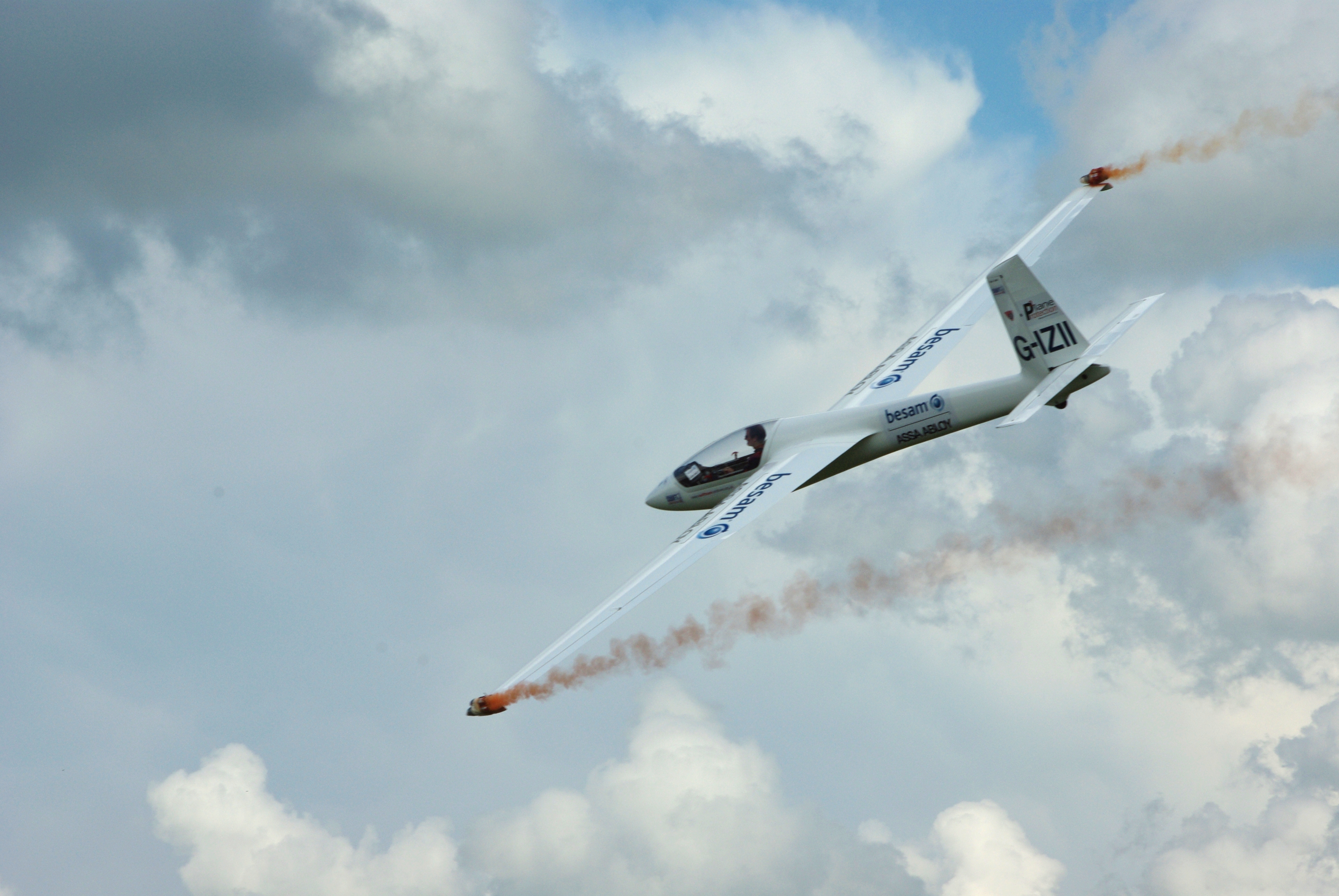
Swift concludes its aerobatic display at Old Warden, England

Georgij Kaminski' demonstration flight on the 90th anniversary of the gliding sport of Russia. S-1 Swift glider.

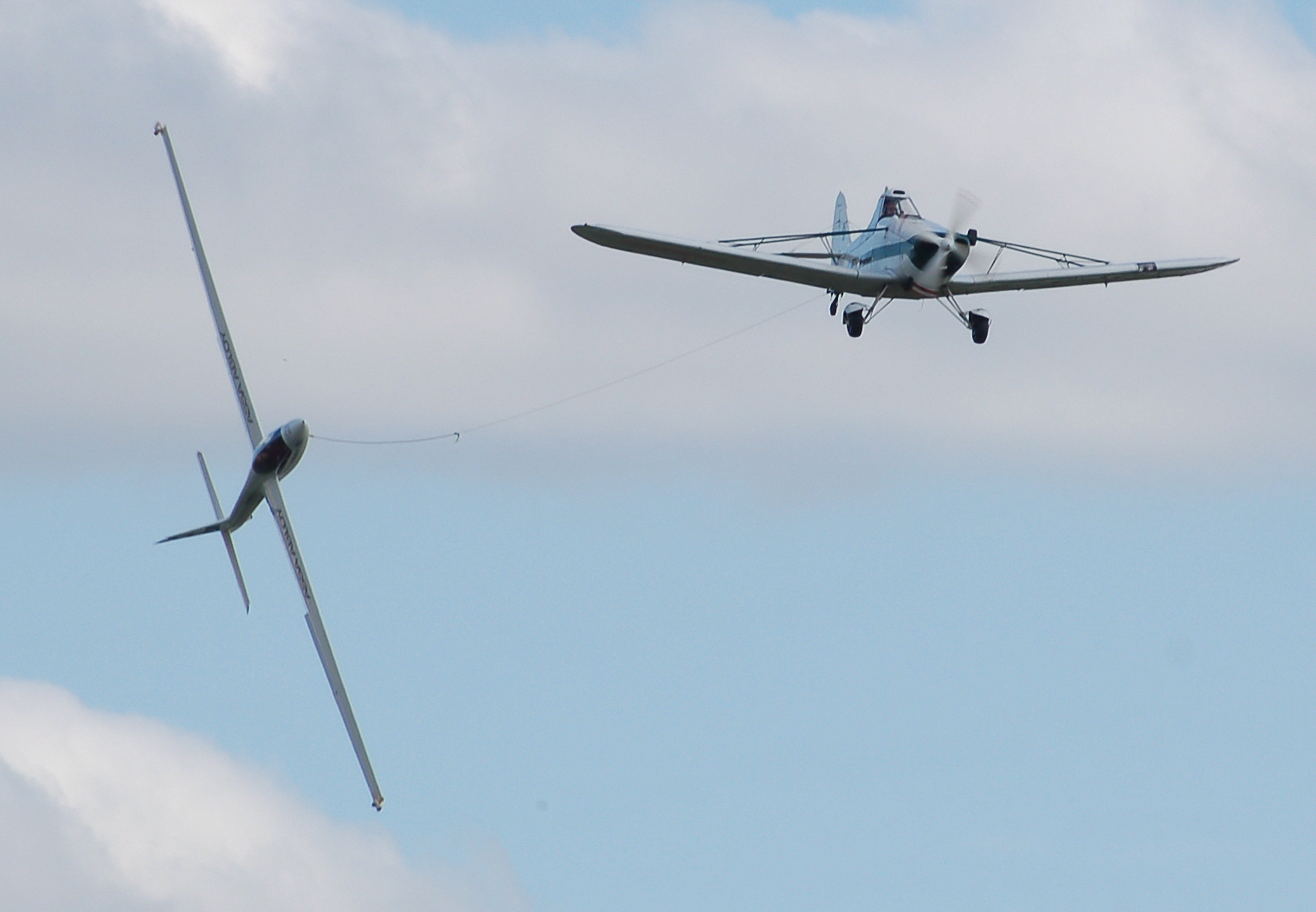
The Swift Aerobatic Display Team at Kemble Battle of Britain Weekend 2009. A Swift S-1 is performing continuous rolls while towed by a Piper Pawnee

== Comparable aircraft ==
- Celair GA-1 Celstar
- MDM-1 Fox
- PZL Bielsko SZD-59
