= New Synagogue (Ostrów Wielkopolski) =

Former Orthodox synagogue, now education institution, in Ostrów Wielkopolski, Poland

- Polish: Nowa Synagoga
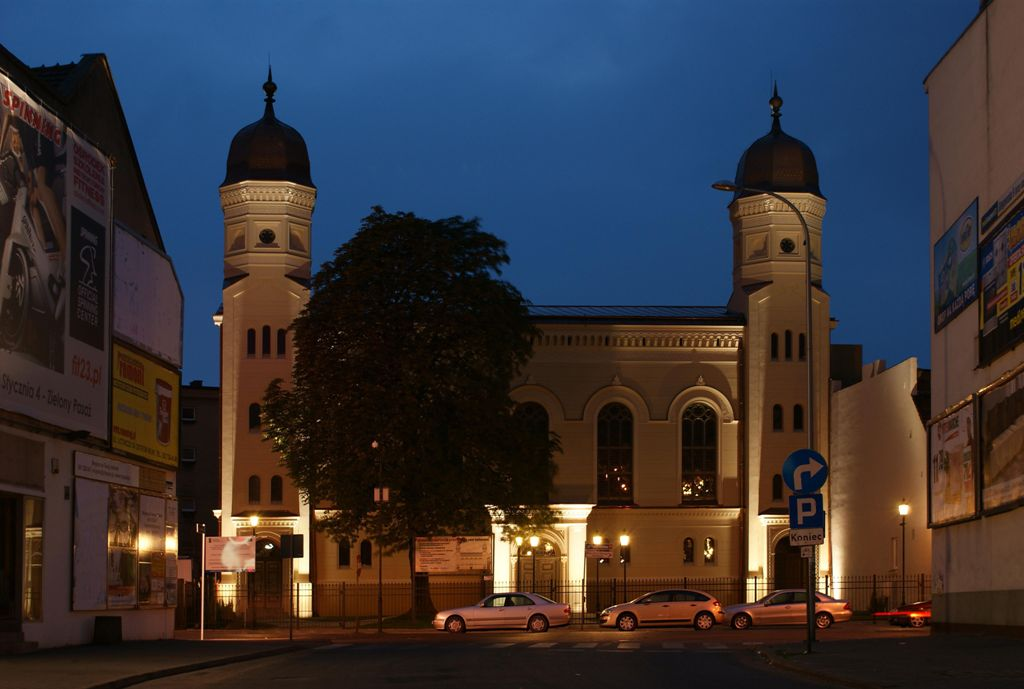
- The former synagogue in 2010, after renovation

- Location of the former synagogue in Greater Poland Voivodeship

Religion
- Affiliation: Orthodox Judaism (former)
- Rite: Nusach Ashkenaz
- Ecclesiastical or organizational status: Synagogue (1860–1939); Profane use (1940–c. 2000s); Education institution (since 2013)
- Status: Abandoned; Repurposed

Location
- Location: 21 Raszkowska Street, Ostrów Wielkopolski, Greater Poland Voivodeship
- Country: Poland
- Interactive map of New Synagogue
- Coordinates: 51°39′07″N 17°48′46″E

Architecture
- Architect: Moritz Landé
- Type: Synagogue architecture
- Style: Moorish Revival
- General contractor: Moritz Landé
- Established: 1724 (as a congregation)
- Groundbreaking: 1857
- Completed: 1860

Specifications
- Height (max): Two
- Materials: Brick

The New Synagogue (Polish: Nowa Synagoga) is a former Orthodox Jewish congregation and synagogue, located at 21 Raszkowska Street, in Ostrów Wielkopolski ([ˈɔstruf vjɛlkɔˈpɔlski]), in the Greater Poland Voivodeship of Poland. Designed by Moritz Landé in the Moorish Revival style and completed in 1860, the former synagogue is located in the city's center, which was the northern edge of the former Jewish district.

Used as a synagogue until World War II when the building's interior was desecrated by Nazis in September 1939, the former synagogue building was used for profane purposes during and after the war, fully restored by the local community, and repurposed as an education institution since 2013. It is the only preserved synagogue in Ostrów Wielkopolski and it is the most precious monument of religious architecture in the town.

== Jewish community in Ostrów ==
In the early eighteenth century with the initiative of Jan Jerzy Przebendowski the first large group of Jewish craftsmen from Germany arrived in Ostrów. Ostrów's Jewish community was founded in 1724 and was a subject to the Jewish community in Kalisz. In the mid-nineteenth century the Jewish community had grown rapidly with the support of successive owners of the town. It numbered more than 1,600 people, represented approximately 25% of the total population of 7,000. Unfortunately, the Jews did not assimilate themselves with the rest of the city's population and their German roots contributed to slightly better relations with Germans. After World War I and after Poland regained independence, much of the community emigrated to Germany. At the outbreak of World War II, there were only 66 Jews left in Ostrów.

The Jews were schooled in the local cheder. They could continue their education at the local Królewskie Gimnazjum Męskie, high school for boys or Miejska Wyższa Szkola Żeńska, high school for girls. For some time, it was possible to study Hebrew openly. Ostrów's rabbis, included Israel Meir Freimann, Elias Plessner and Leopold Neuhaus, outstanding representatives of their community. After World War I, the rabbinical ministry was delivered by a rabbi of the nearby town of Kępno.

The Jewish quarter was located on the west side of the city's square, in the area of the town's cattle market. The two consecutive synagogues and ancillary facilities (cheder, mikveh, and beysoylem [cemetery] I and II) were built within the vicinity. Now, only the synagogue remains from the entire Jewish quarter. During World War II or later all traces of the material presence of Jews were wiped out, the final element of the group of synagogue buildings was demolished in the 1990s.

=== The Old Synagogue ===
The old wooden synagogue was located in the city center, the western part of the former Jewish district. A power transformer sits on its former location. The synagogue was built in 1724 with the support of the town's owner, Jan Jerzy Przebendowski. It was a small shingled building and functioned till a new, larger synagogue was completed in 1860.

=== The New Synagogue ===
The construction of a new building was determined by the fact that the old one was very small and of a poor condition. It was built in Moorish Revival style, popular among European synagogues. The cornerstone was laid on 7 April 1857, with Rabbi Aron Moses Stössel presiding at the ceremony (originally from Neu-Rausnitz, Moravia, Stössel had served the Ostrowo community since 1849). The building was designed by Moritz Landé, who also supervised its construction. The synagogue was completed in 1860. Building the synagogue would not have been possible without support from outside the Jewish community. Special merits went to Józef Aleksander Nasierowski, heir of the village of Wysocko.

On 10 October 1872, a tragic event occurred there. During the prayers on Yom Kippur gas lamps went out. Women and children whose place was up in the gallery, panicked. While fleeing, the staircase collapsed killing 19 people (Jews and one Christian girl). They were buried (except the Christian girl) in a mass grave in the Jewish cemetery which no longer exists. In 1903, renovations were completed, that cost DM12,000. During World War II, the Nazis demolished almost the entire Jewish Quarter. The synagogue was spared as a warehouse for liquor and food. After the war, in the absence of Jewish community, the synagogue served as a furniture warehouse. The communists made changes to its interior by removing its movable parts, ritual objects, and liquidated Aron Kodesh.

In 1946, the Polish Army unit stationed in Ostrów suggested that a theater with a symphony orchestra be founded there but the Supreme Religious Council of Polish Jews and the Ministry of Public Administration did not give their consent to use it for artistic purposes.

In the mid-1980s several projects were suggested to adapt the space; unfortunately only one has passed which was the renovation of the roofing, to protect the wooden interior from decomposition caused by rainwater. In 1988 the synagogue was registered as a local monument.

It was occasionally open as a performance theater. A non-professional theater festival, and the Film in Slides festival took place there as well as a series of seminars: Past for the Future, about the dealing with the penetration of German, Jewish, Polish and Russian cultures, where Shevah Weiss, Israeli Ambassador to Poland, was an honorary guest.

In 2006, the matter of ownership of the synagogue and the two cemeteries had been dealt with. In exchange for the waiver of claims to the synagogue, the local government paid 225,000 zloty to the Jewish community in Wroclaw, and promised to build a lapidarium, collection of stone monuments on the site of the former Jewish cemetery, at the government's expense.

In line with the 2005 Local Revitalization Program of Ostrów, the synagogue was to become a Center of the Three Cultures named for Wojciech Bąk, Israel Meir Freimann and Edzard Schaper. Symphonic and choral concerts, theater performances and conferences were to take place in the main prayer hall.

In 2006 an Association of Friends of Ostrów's Synagogue was established and in January 2007, the local government had allocated almost one million zloty for renovation of the synagogue. After renovation in 2010 the synagogue was used as a venue for art related events.

The 150th anniversary of the synagogue was celebrated on 16 April 2007. On this occasion, the Association of Friends of the Ostrów's Synagogues, and Radoslaw Torzyński, the Mayor of Ostrów, organized a special conference with several lectures and discussions on the history of the Jews in Ostrów. Bettina Landé-Tergeist, the great-great-granddaughter of Moritz Landé, the craftsman of the synagogue, was a special guest at the conference.

== Architecture ==
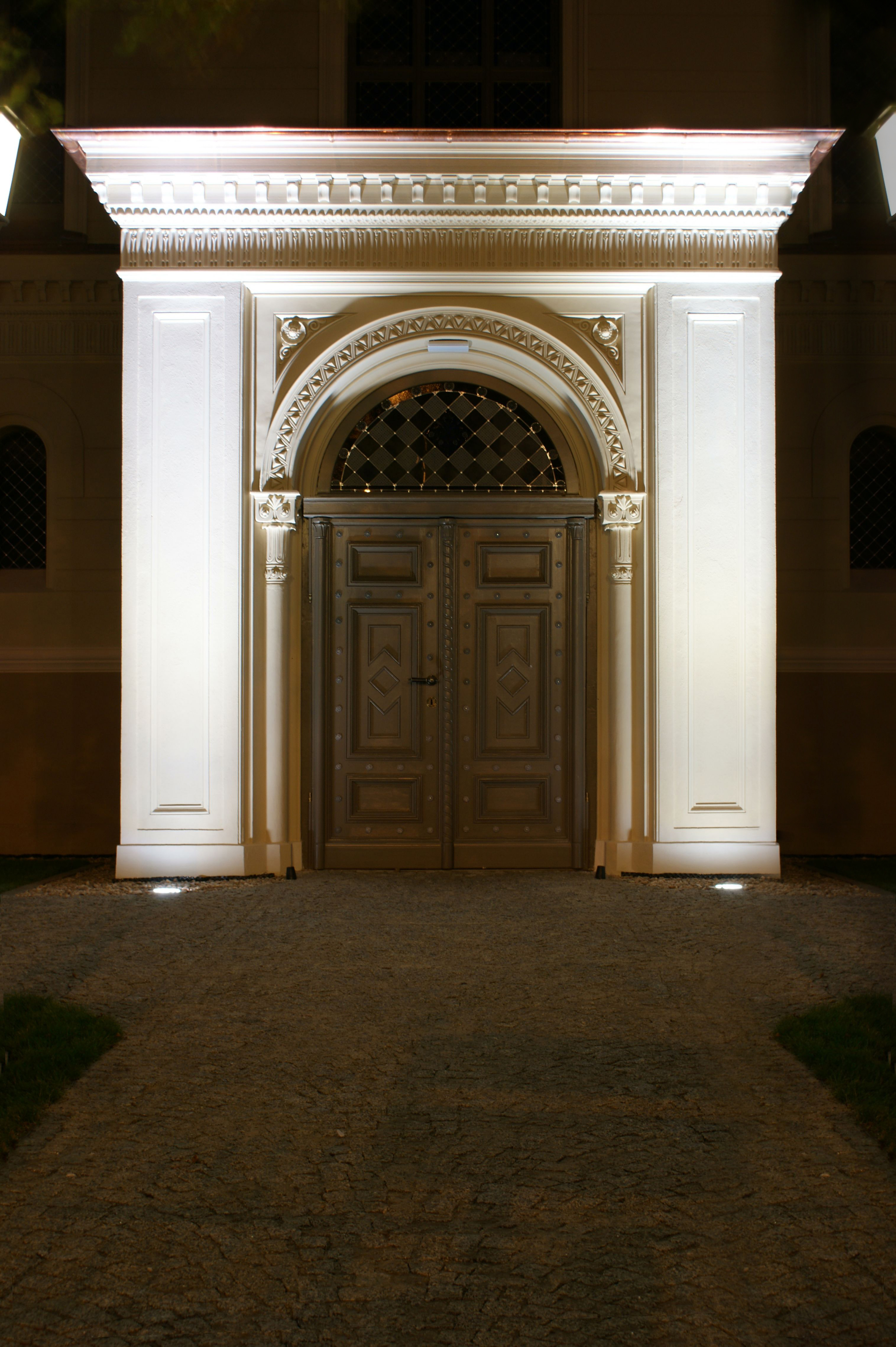
Illuminated portal

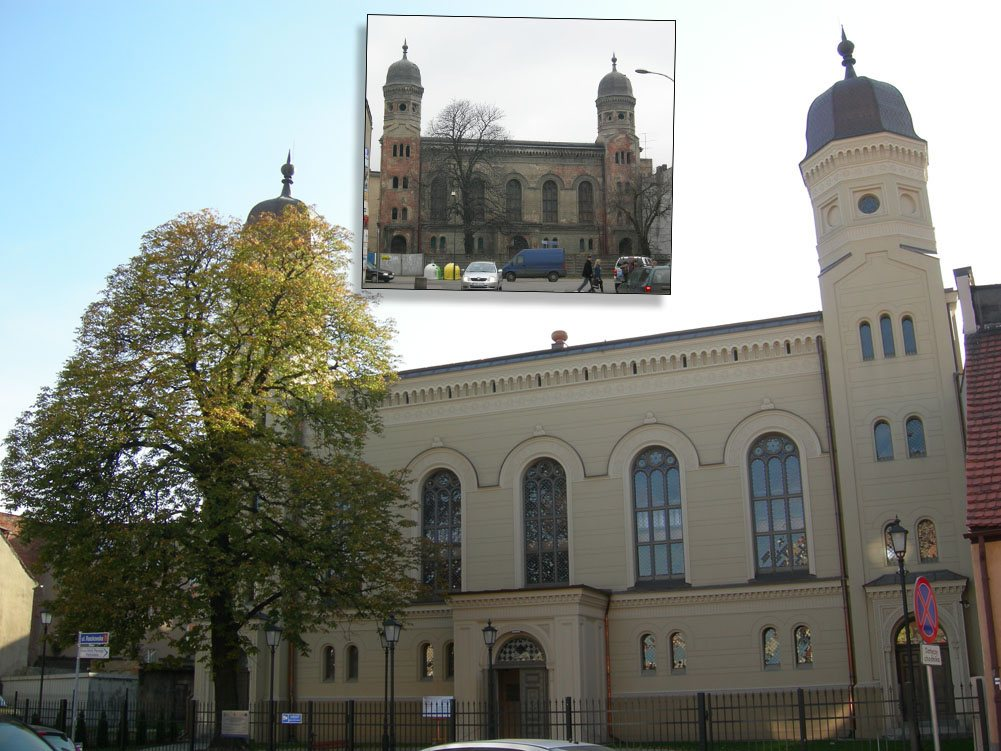
Synagogue before/after

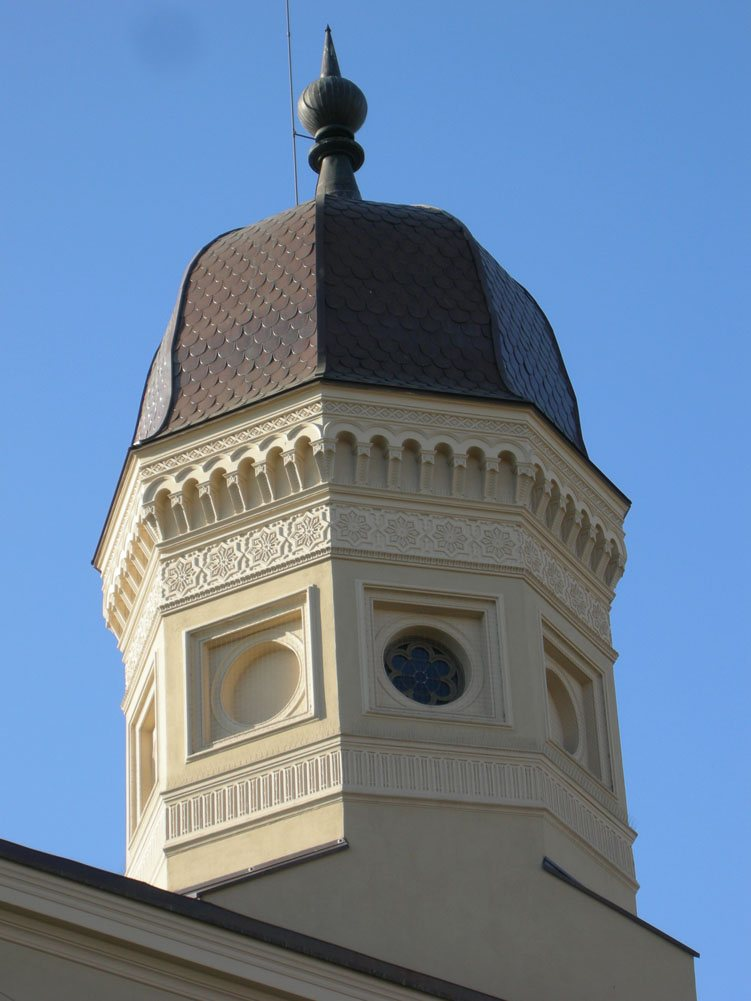
Right tower

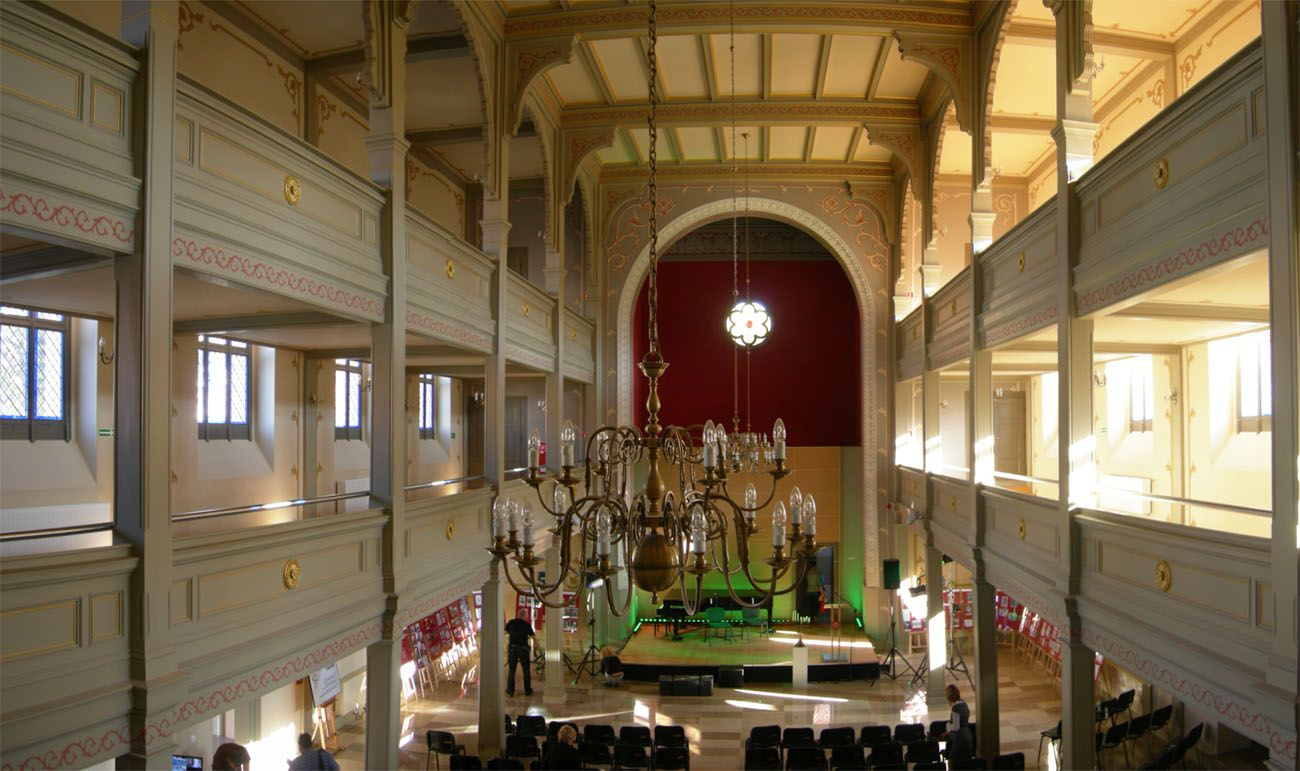
Interior

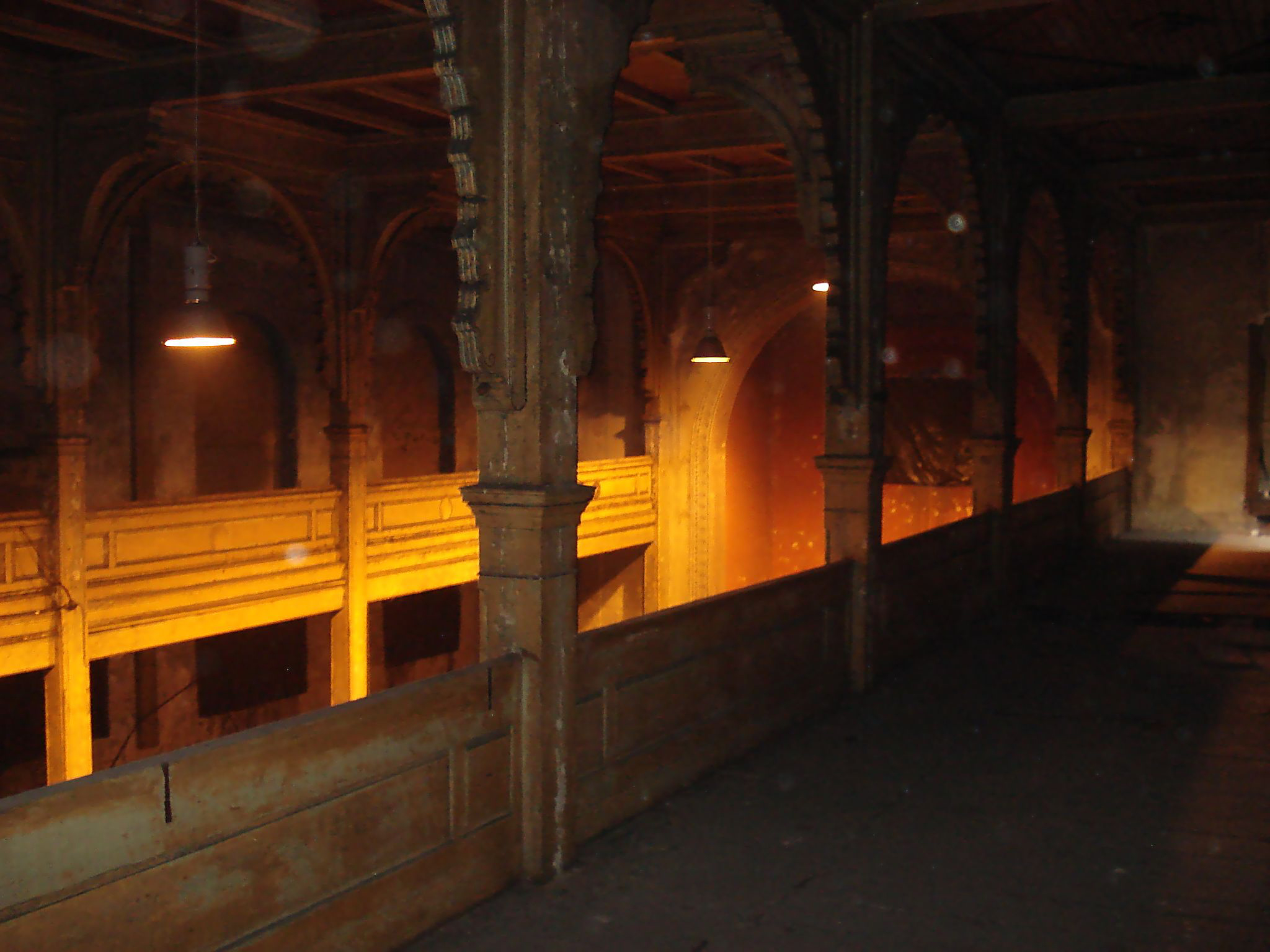
Interior

The impressive building is of Moorish Revival style, basically formed on the style of Muslim North Africa and Spain. The purpose of this style was to highlight the oriental origin of the Jewish community. There are accretions of typical nineteenth-century Renaissance Revival and Byzantine Revival styles. The building is large, with two towers located on the sides.

Façade

The northern elevation is divided into two parts: the towers and five axial bodies which are located between them. The ground floor with the portals and mullion windows create the ABBABBA (A portal, B-latticed screens) plan. The east portal was the entrance for women and children and the west one for men. The whole plan with its divisions probably refers to the menorah (7 bays, porch as the middle frame from which other candles were lit). The façade was richly decorated with ocher color.

First level

Located on the ground floor in the middle of the body (4 axis), has a small flat roof porch with the main portal. The portal has fanlight, flanked by half-columns with smooth shafts. The capitals with cornices are decorated palmettes. The portal is closed with a full arc, archivolts geometrically ornamented with triangles. Fortunately, this molding was known from the side portals. The auxiliary arches are decorated with palmettes with volutes. This motif was also seen on the fragments of the side portals. The porch plaster is split with horizontal and vertical lines, creating a framework. The porch's corners are visibly projecting forward.

The triforium of the neighboring axis (2, 3, 5, 6) are mullions with window sills sloping toward the outside. The deteriorated mullions were covered with wooden panels. A plinth is visible up to about one meter above the ground. The plaster is decorated with flat rustication with arches furrows to emphasize each window. The ground floor is separated from the second floor with a continuous frieze of vertical furrow motive. The frieze surrounds the porch and the risalit (towers), and above there is a corbel with repeated motifs supporting string course cornices.

Gallery

The windows there are two stories high, the height of the internal galleries, plus in the frieze there are small window openings but on the attic level.

The five large, vertical windows (in the axes 2, 3, 4, 5, 6) are topped with a full arch, decorated with quite wide archivolts, though supported with rustication. On top of archivolts there are acroterions clearly standing off the face of the wall. The interior wooden shutters are decorated with tracery with long transoms. In the past the glazing was colorful. The plaster is with flat rustication. The facade is topped with a wide cymatium ornamentation with geometric shapes of eight arm stars. And above it, in the arcade frieze there is a very prominent full arc and every fifth bay there is a small window (looks like machicolation). The whole facade is finished by a crown cornice. The roofing is gambrel covered with tar.

Towers

The towers flank the façade and in the horizontal plan they are square. They are placed slightly forward from the face of the facility (risalit). They have five floors. On their ground floor, they are put forward with small portals and sloped roof. The portals décor is identical to the main portal. In the second and third floors there are mullions. On the west tower's window, there is a wooden openwork preserved in the whole opening. On the fourth floor there is a triforium. The fifth tier plan changes to an octagon. It is in a shape of a drum with oeil-de-boeuf (ox-eye) windows. The windows are placed in a square brick boxes on all eight sides (lanterns). A frieze cymatium, similar to the body of the synagogue connects the dome with the tower. Onion shaped octahedral dome is covered with gray half round tiles (arranged like fish scale). The whole is topped with a spire coming from the center.

Eastern and southern elevations are modestly embellished.

Interior

The one room rectangular main prayer hall has wooden semicircle arches and arcades, a two-level gallery with flat ceilings for women. Decorative painting depicting geometric and foliage motifs were scarcely preserved. The eastern wall was originally richly decorated with Aron Kodesh which was enclosed in an interior size frame finished with a semicircular arc. A rosette lined with blue and gold rays and rings was preserved on that wall. Most of the equipment of the synagogue was removed by the Communists. Dim light used to come through stained glass oculus in the front and rear facades and the ox-eye windows placed high on the side facades.

== See also ==
- Chronology of Jewish Polish history
- History of the Jews in Poland
- Jewish cemeteries in Ostrów
- List of active synagogues in Poland
