= Moritz Landé =

German architect

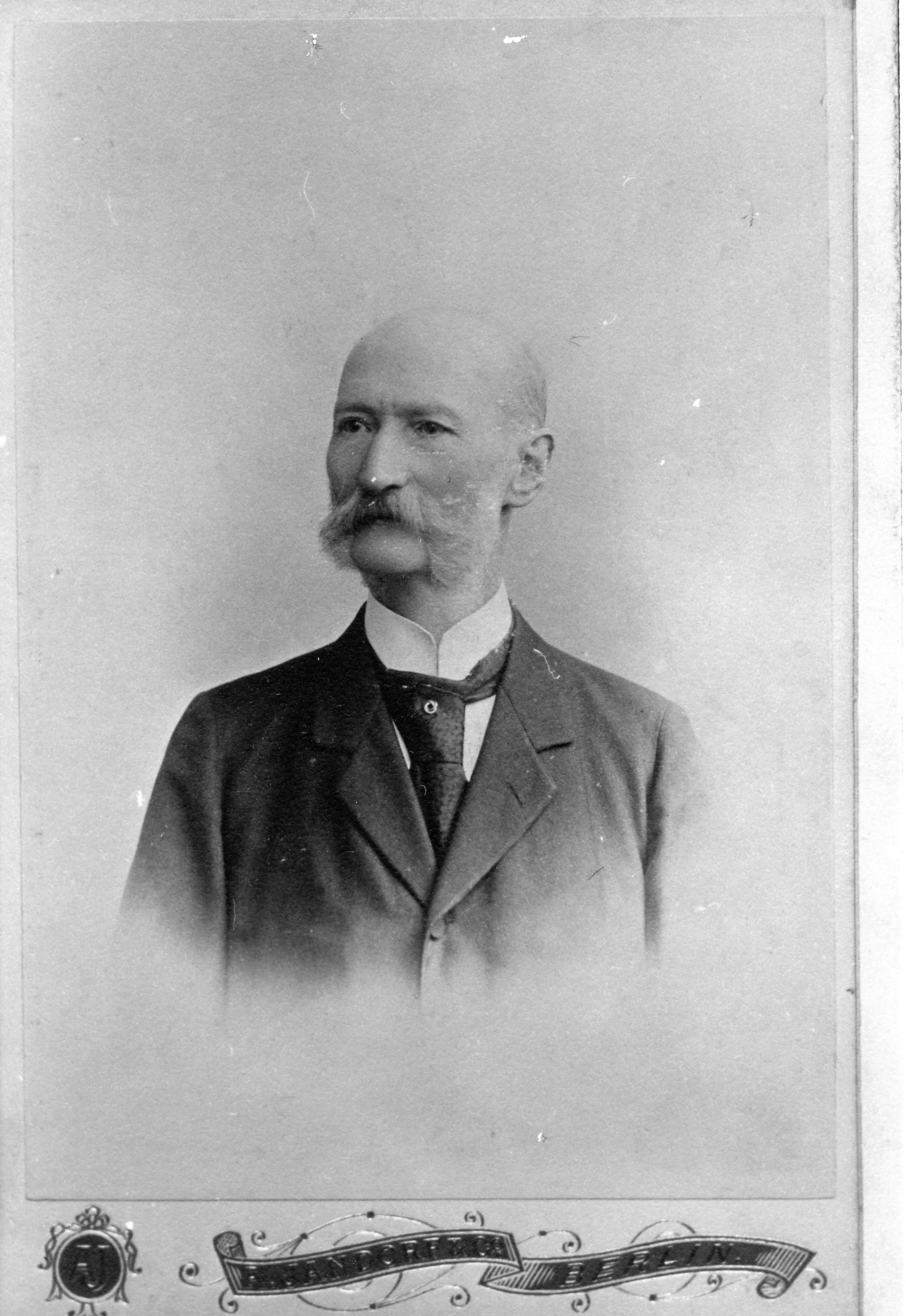
Moritz Landé. Picture copied from original by A. Jandorf & Co., Berlin, Germany, since this former warehouse chain hadn't existed during lifetime of Moritz Landé

Moritz Landé (2 March 1829 in Ostrowo – 23 June 1888 in Berlin, Germany) was a German architect of Jewish origin. Landé was born in the Prussian Province of Posen. He was the son of Löbel Landé, a merchant from Ostrowo. Initially educated at his home under the supervision of a private teacher, he continued his studies as a master mason in Breslau. Finally he moved away to live with his uncle Jacob Landé, who was an architect. In 1857 he married Sophie Block (1 September 1835 – 23 June 1913). They had five children, one was Thekla Landé (1864–1932).

Moritz Landé designed and oversaw the construction of The New Synagogue in Ostrow Wielkopolski (1857–1860). After 1864 the Landés moved to Berlin. There he designed a house for his family. Moritz Landé died in 1888 in Berlin, Germany, and is buried, together with his wife Sophie on Europe's largest Jewish cemetery in Berlin's Eastern borough Weißensee.

The last residence of Moritz Landé was at Wilhelmstrasse 143 in Berlin whereas his wife had her last residence at Kurfürstenstrasse 99 a in Berlin.

The burial of Sophie Landé was initiated by her son Otto, whose profession/function was noted as director.
