= Bernhard Rawitz =

German military physician, anatomist and zoologist

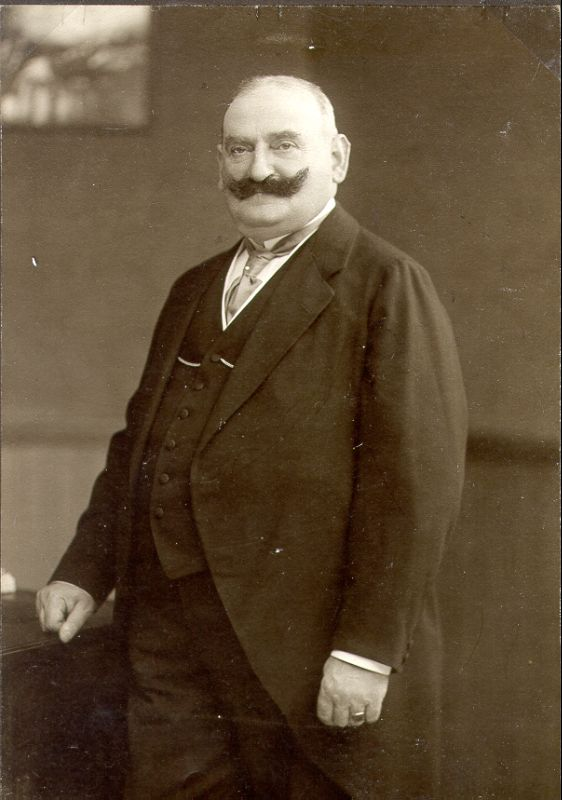
Bernhard Rawitz (1857-1932)

Bernhard Rawitz (23 August 1857, Ostrowo - 28 December 1932) was a German military physician, anatomist and zoologist.

He studied medicine at Kaiser Wilhlem Akademie in Berlin, afterwards serving as a military doctor in Metz (1880–83). He later worked at the zoological stations in Naples (1887–88, 1890) and Rovigno (1892-1898). In the late 19th century he journeyed to northern Norway (Tromsø, Sørvær, Trollfjord, Bear Island), where he performed studies of cetaceans.

In 1889, he qualified as a lecturer of comparative anatomy, and in 1912, was appointed an associate professor to the museum of pathology at the University of Berlin.

== Selected writings ==
- Die Ranvier'schen Einschnüringen Lautermann'schen Einkerbungen, 1879 (dissertation).
- Die Fußdrüse der Opistobranchier, 1887 - The foot glands of Opisthobranchia.
- Leitfaden für histologische Untersuchungen, 1889 - Guidelines for histological studies.
- Grundriß der Histologie, 1894 - Outline of histology.
- Das Gehörorgan der japanischen Tanzmäuse, 1899 - The hearing organ of the Japanese dancing mouse.
- Ueber den Bau der Cetaceenhaut, 1899 - On the construction of whaleskin
- Lehrbuch der mikroskopischen Technik, 1907 - Textbook of microscopic technique.
- Zeit und Gott : eine kritisch-erkenntnistheoretische Untersuchung auf der Grundlage der physikalischen Relativitätstheorie, (1922, second edition) - Time and God: a critical and epistemological investigation on the basis of the physical theory of relativity.
