= Jan Żniniewicz =

Jan Norbert Żniniewicz (1 December 1872 in Ostrów Wielkopolski – 25 July 1952 in Poznań) was a Polish balneologist, pioneer of modern hydrotherapy in Poland.

He introduced new methods in a hydrotherapy treatment. He founded a hydrotherapy institute in Poznań.

== Notable publications ==
- Hartowanie ciała i leczenie wodą w świetle fizjologii
- Wodolecznictwo a nerwy
