= Ostrów Wielkopolski =

City in Greater Poland, Poland

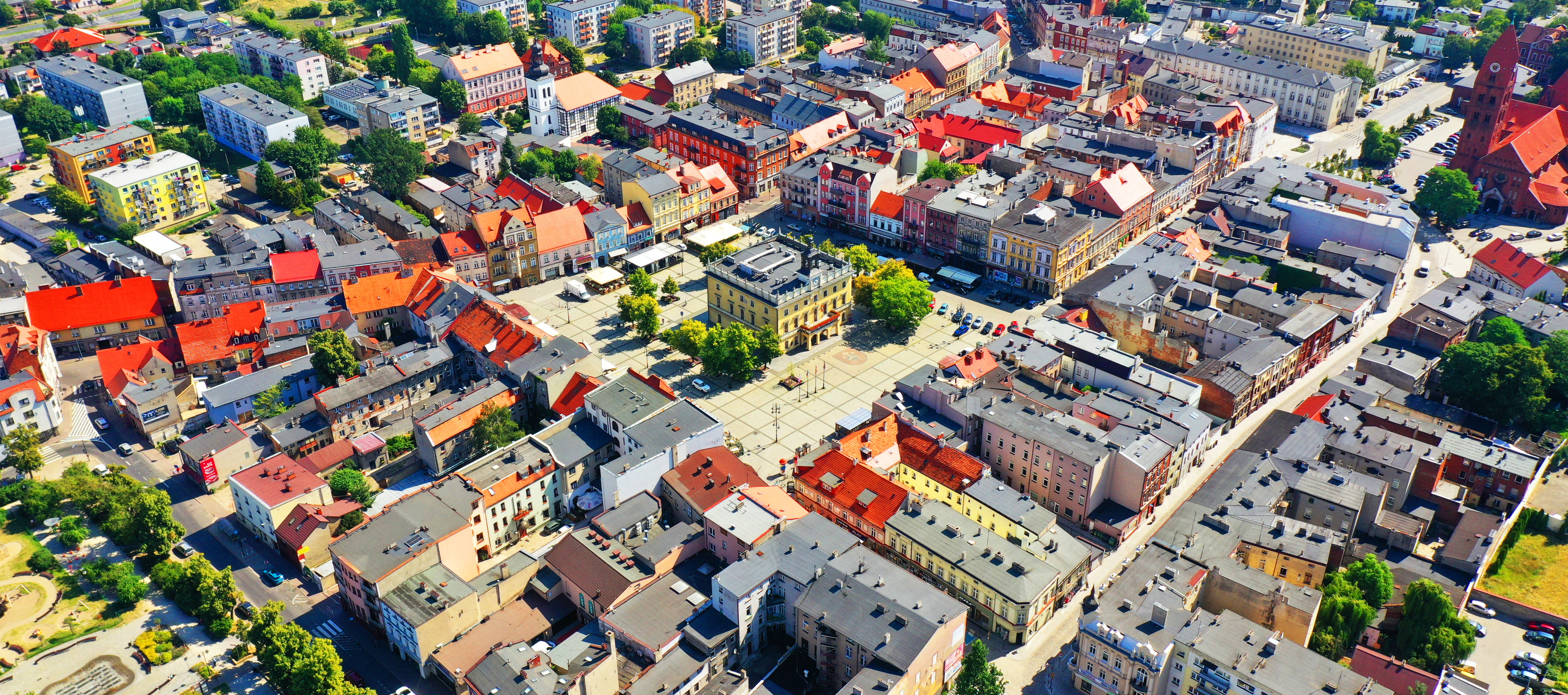
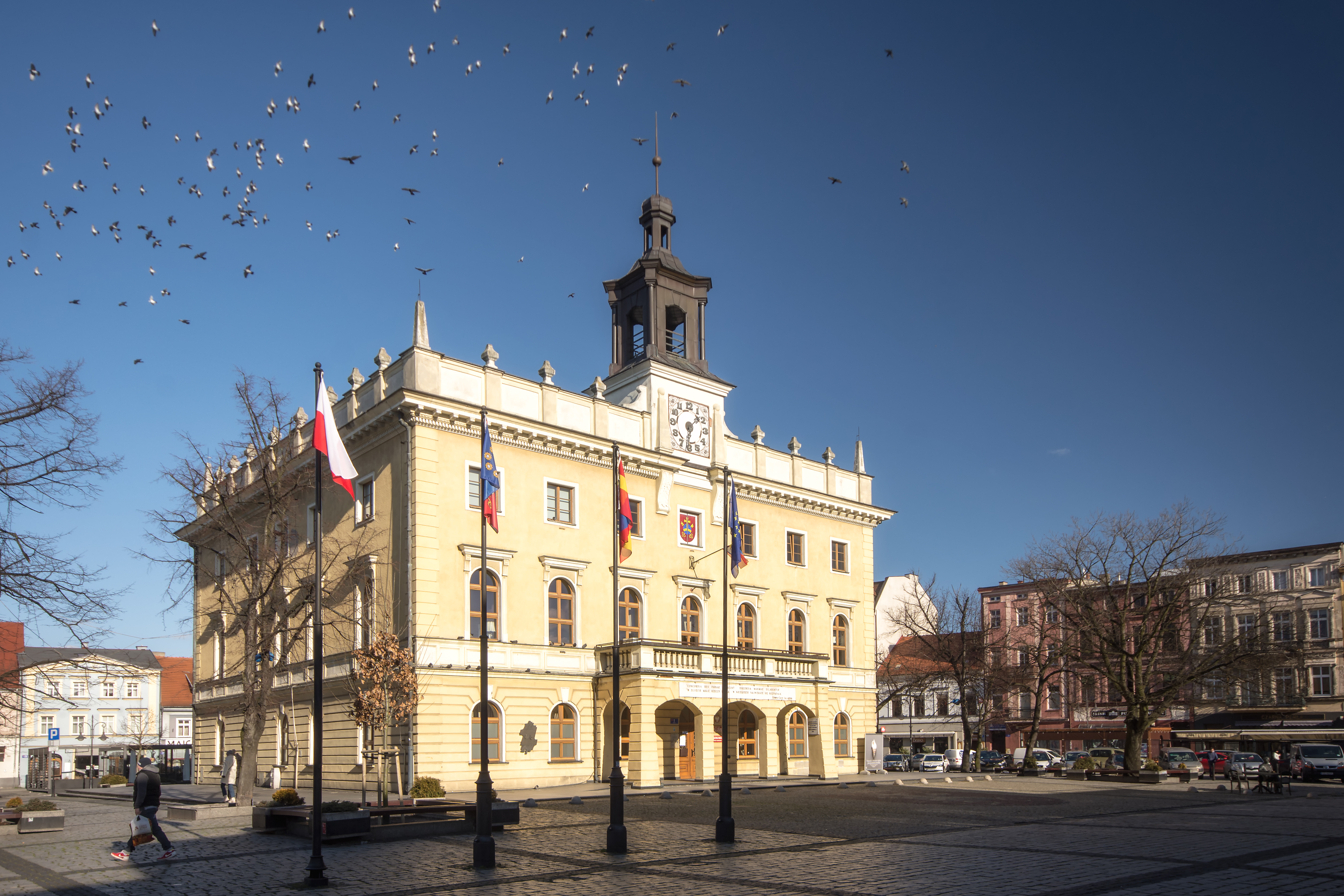
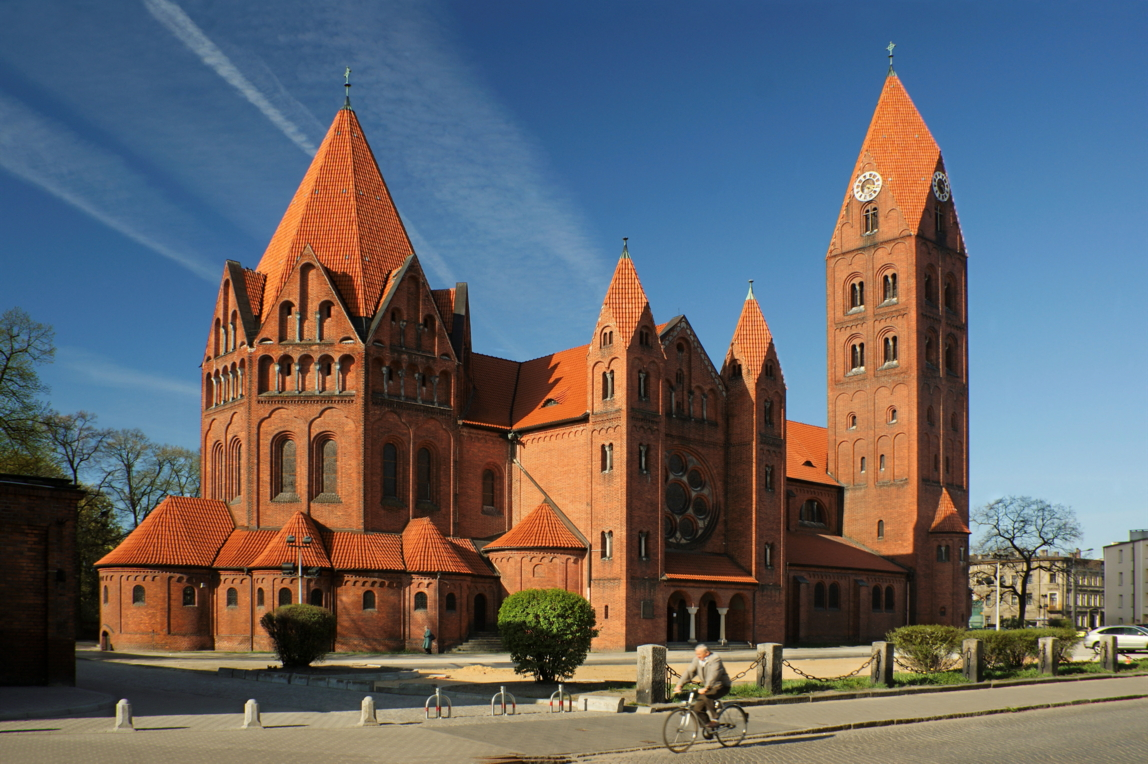
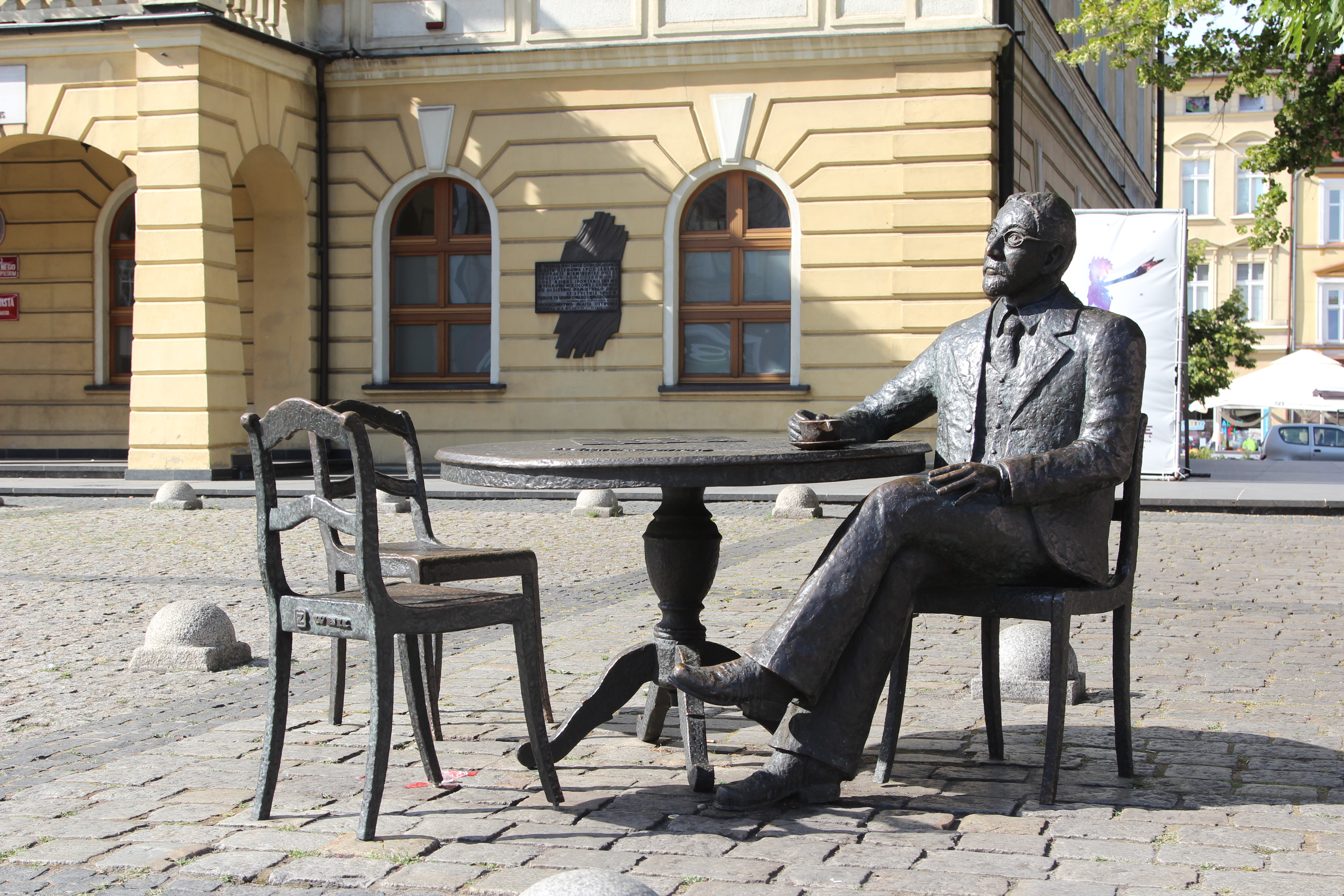
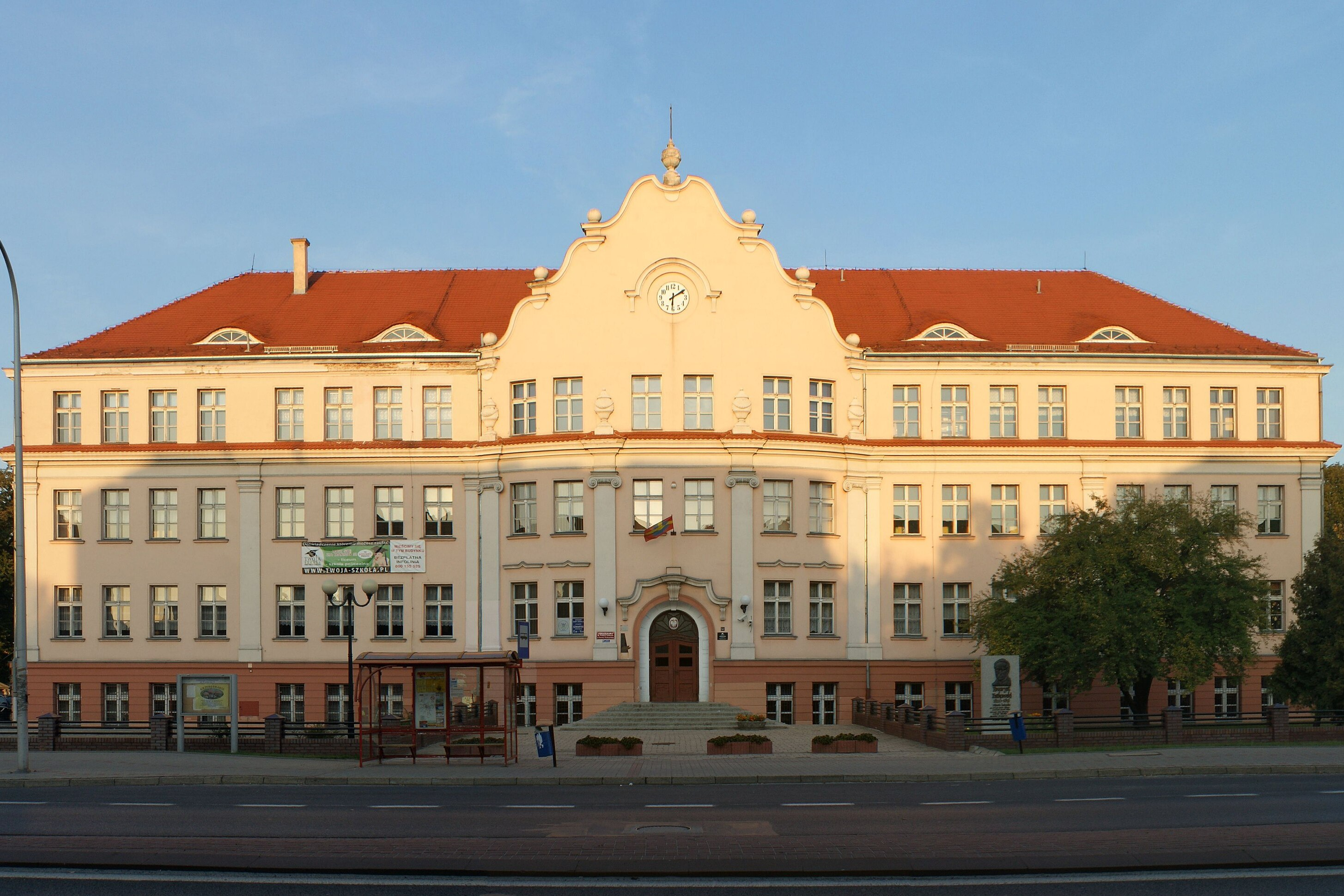
- Aerial view of Market Square City Hall Co-Cathedral Stefan Rowiński bench Elementary School No. 2

- Flag Coat of arms

- Location within Poland
- Coordinates: 51°38′58″N 17°48′59″E
- Country: Poland
- Voivodeship: Greater Poland
- County: Ostrów
- Gmina: Ostrów Wielkopolski (urban gmina)
- First mentioned: 1293
- City rights: 15th century

Government
  - City mayor: Beata Klimek (L)

Area
  - Total: 41.9 km^{2} (16.2 sq mi)
- Highest elevation: 175 m (574 ft)
- Lowest elevation: 123 m (404 ft)

Population (30 July 2024)
  - Total: 68 949 ▼
- Time zone: UTC+1 (CET)
  - Summer (DST): UTC+2 (CEST)
- Postal code: 63-400 to 63-417
- Area code: +48 62
- Car plates: POS
- Climate: Cfb
- Website: http://www.umostrow.pl/

Ostrów Wielkopolski (Polish pronunciation: [ˈɔstruv vjɛlkɔˈpɔlskʲi]; often abbreviated Ostrów Wlkp., formerly called simply Ostrów; Latin: Ostrovia) is a city in west-central Poland with inhabitants 68 949 (2024), situated in the Greater Poland Voivodeship; the seat of Ostrów County. It is the fifth-largest city in the voivodeship after Poznań, Kalisz, Piła and Konin.

It is located in the Kalisz Land in the south-eastern part of historic Greater Poland.

== History ==
=== Early history ===
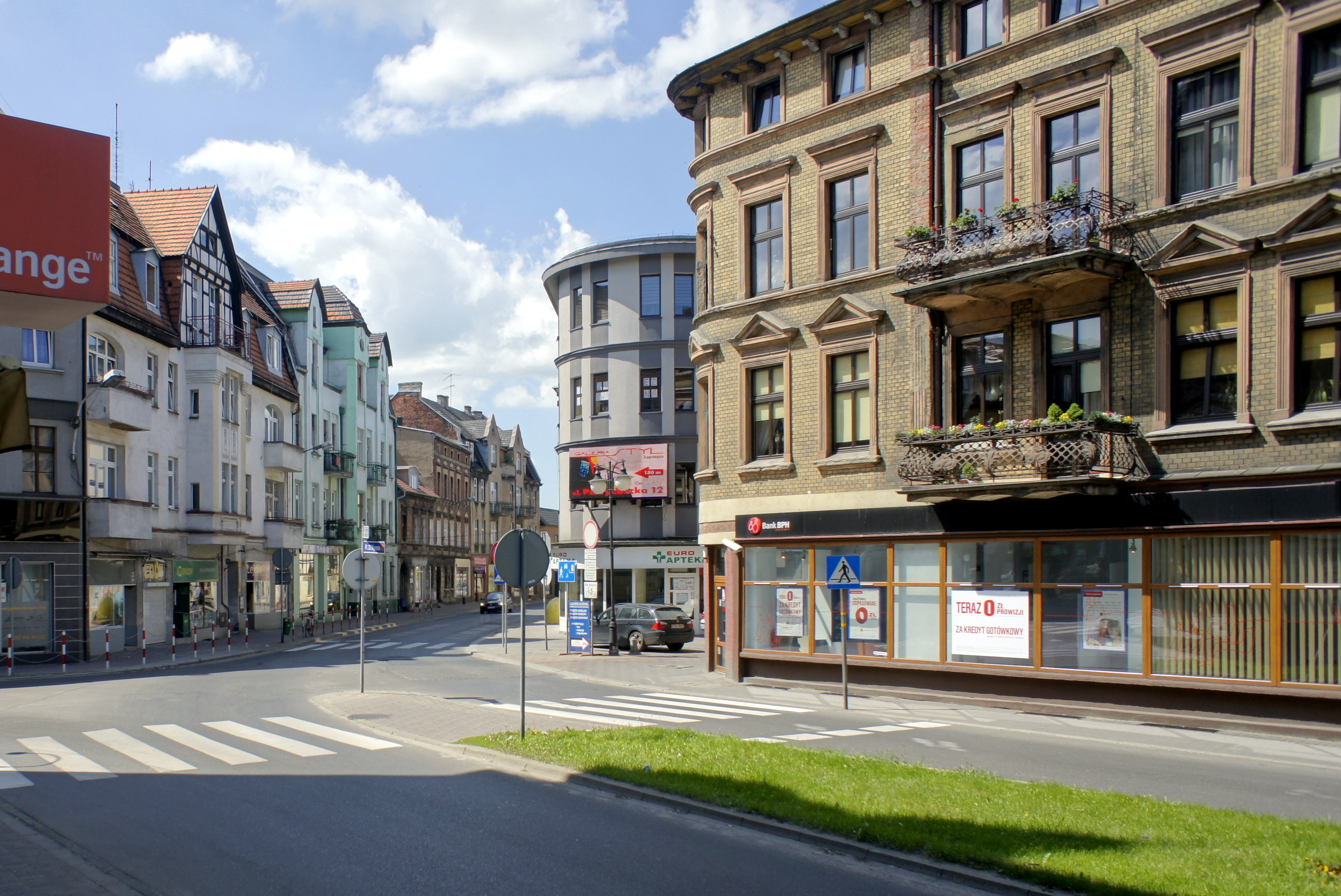
Partyzancka Street in Ostrów Wielkopolski

Recently, a small fortified dwelling dating from the 10th century was discovered on the north-east side of the town's limits. An archaeological excavation is now in progress. It was part of Poland since the establishment of the state in the 10th century.

The oldest known mention of Ostrów comes from a document from 1293. Ostrów received town rights in 1404 but the economic stagnation caused by fires, wars, and a weak 16th-century nobility, led to the town's officials dropping its town status in 1711. Administratively it was located in the Kalisz Voivodeship in the Greater Poland Province. In 1714, one of the nobles of Ostrów, Jan Jerzy Przebendowski, intervened at the royal court, for the status to be reinstated. To help the city grow, new settlers were exempt from taxes for six years. By the power of Grand Crown Marshal Franciszek Bieliński, the town received its status back with greater privileges. Another noble family, the Radziwiłł family took patronage over the town and looked over its many investments. The care of the town's owners, work of its people, and dedication of its officials, as well as its location, favored the town's continuous growth.

=== Late modern period ===
During the Second Partition of Poland, in 1793, the town was annexed by Kingdom of Prussia. After the successful Greater Poland uprising of 1806, it was regained by Poles and included within the short-lived Duchy of Warsaw. It was re-annexed by Prussia, to be included within the initially autonomous Grand Duchy of Poznań in 1815. The cloth industry prospered in Ostrów until 1825, when Russia imposed tariffs on imported cloths, as a result of which many textile manufacturers moved east to the Russian Partition of Poland. In 1828 local noble Antoni Radziwiłł funded the construction of a new town hall. In 1845 the Royal Catholic Gymnasium was established, a significant Polish school in the Prussian Partition of Poland, which as the I Liceum Ogólnokształcące remains one of the most renowned high schools in Greater Poland. Ostrów then became an important center of Polish education, press and publishing in the region. Among the local Polish elites were Antoni Bronikowski, an outstanding Hellenist who translated the works of Plato, Homer, Thucydides and Xenophon into Polish, and poet Anastazy Cywiński. The establishment of a railroad hub in Ostrów was a vital turning point in its development, helping to lend the town prominent status on the local and national scene. In 1875 the first railway connections were opened, with Poznań and Kluczbork. The Primate of Poland Cardinal Mieczysław Halka-Ledóchowski was imprisoned in the local prison for two years by the Prussians, before they eventually expelled him from the country. After Poland regained independence, he was honored with a monument in the city.

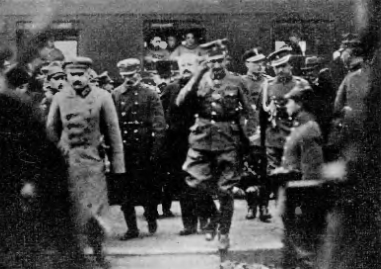
Marshall Józef Piłsudski during his visit in Ostrów in 1919

Ostrów was an important center of Polish resistance and national liberation movements. One of the town's historic episodes was the so-called Republic of Ostrów (Republika Ostrowska), which was the citizens’ upheaval of 1918. No blood was shed at that upheaval and all political powers were taken over from the Prussian authorities. The anniversary of the upheaval, November 10, is celebrated as the official Day of the City of Ostrów Wielkopolski. The first Polish mayor of Ostrów after regaining independence was Stefan Rowiński, one of the leading independence activists and publishers in Ostrów before 1918. Following the Polish–Soviet War, from 1920, the 60th Infantry Regiment of the Polish Army was stationed in Ostrów Wielkopolski. In the interbellum, Ostrów was one of the fastest growing towns: the number of inhabitants doubled, showy houses were built, as well as new schools, stadiums and a swimming pool. Three new villa district were founded, and a modern railcar manufacturing (Fabryka Wagon) began. In 1934 the city limits were widely expanded and the villages of Stare Kamienice, Zębców, Wenecja and Krępa became new districts of Ostrów.

=== World War II ===
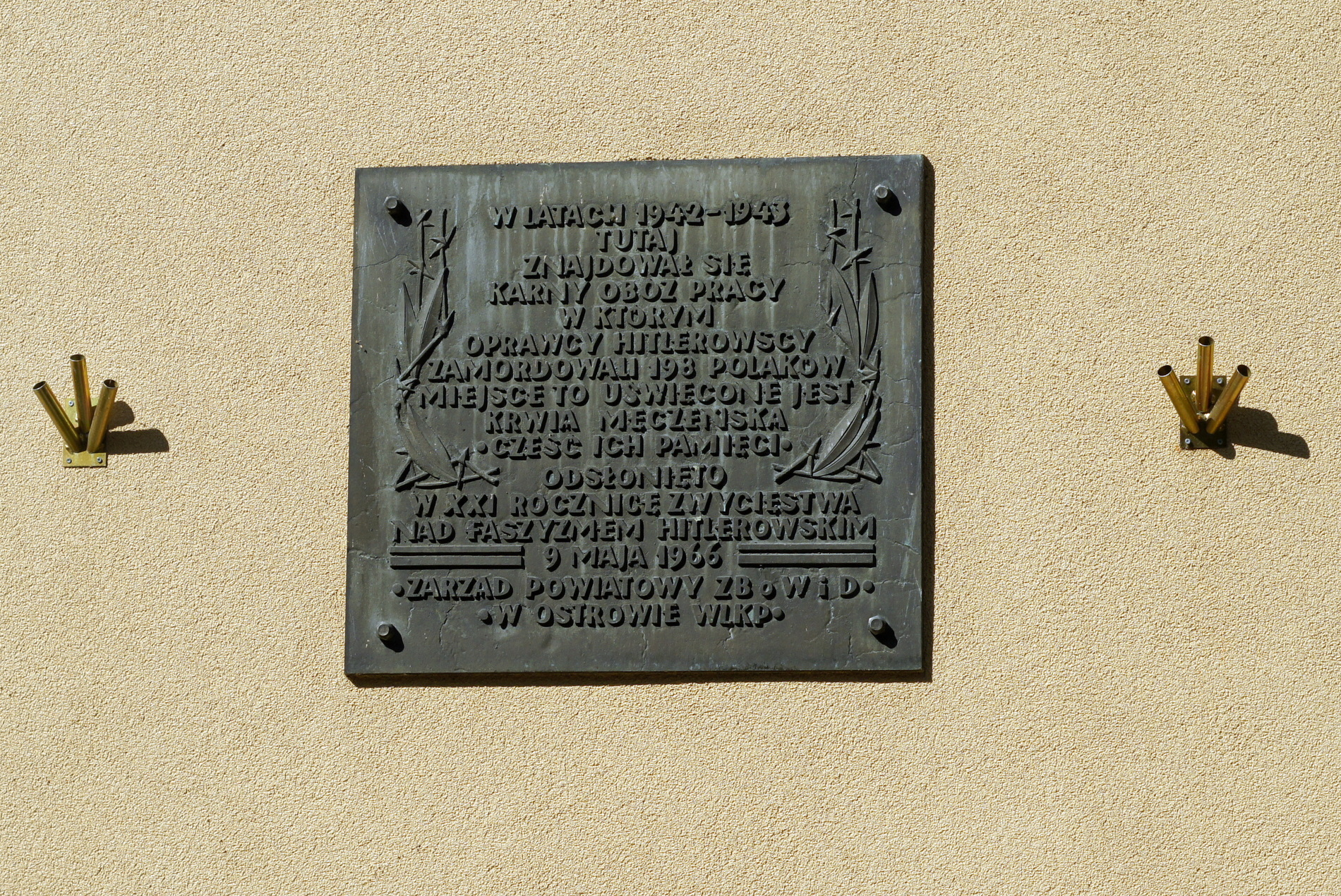
Memorial plaque at the former German labor camp which existed during the occupation of Poland

During the German invasion of Poland, which started World War II, the Einsatzgruppe III entered the city on September 7–9, 1939 to commit various crimes against Poles, and also the SS-Totenkopf-Standarte Brandenburg operated in the city. During the German occupation of Poland, local Poles were subjected to mass arrests, imprisonment, deportations to concentration camps, expulsions, forced labour and massacres.

In late 1939 and early 1940, many Poles were arrested during the Intelligenzaktion, then imprisoned in Kalisz and murdered in large massacres in the Winiary forest. Among the victims were activists, school principals, former participants of the Polish Greater Poland uprising (1918–19) against Germany, and pre-war mayor Stanisław Musielak. The Germans also established a Nazi prison for Poles in Ostrów. Further mass arrests of around 400 Poles from the county were carried out in April–May 1940, and many of the victims were then imprisoned in the local prison. Teachers from Ostrów were among Polish teachers murdered in the Mauthausen concentration camp. A Nazi German labor camp, Staatspolizeistelle Litzmannstadt Arbeitserziehungslager Ostrowo, operated within the town's limits, where 193 people died.

The Germans carried out first expulsions of Poles in October 1939, focusing on owners of bakeries, cafes, workshops and large apartments, which were then handed over to German colonists as part of the Lebensraum policy, while expelled Poles were held in a transit camp in nearby Nowe Skalmierzyce for several weeks, and then deported to the General Government (German-occupied central Poland). Further 160 Poles were expelled in December 1939 to the Radom District of the General Government. Also a transit camp for Poles expelled from nearby villages was established in the local church. Further expulsions of Poles were carried out in 1940–1941.

The town was one of the major Polish conspiracy centers in the Greater Poland region. The Polish Secret Military Organization was founded in Ostrów in October 1939, and there were also structures of the Polish Underground State in the city. In 1941, after the Gestapo's crackdown on the headquarters of the Poznań branch of the underground army Union for Armed Struggle-ZWZ, the headquarters were moved to Ostrów. From here the re-structure of the Poznań region of the Union was conducted. Polish underground press was printed in Ostrów and then distributed in Ostrów and other nearby towns, including Krotoszyn, Ostrzeszów, Pleszew. Ostrów was liberated from German occupation on January 23, 1945. The town was restored to Poland, although with a Soviet-installed communist regime, which then stayed in power until the Fall of Communism in the 1980s.

=== Recent period ===
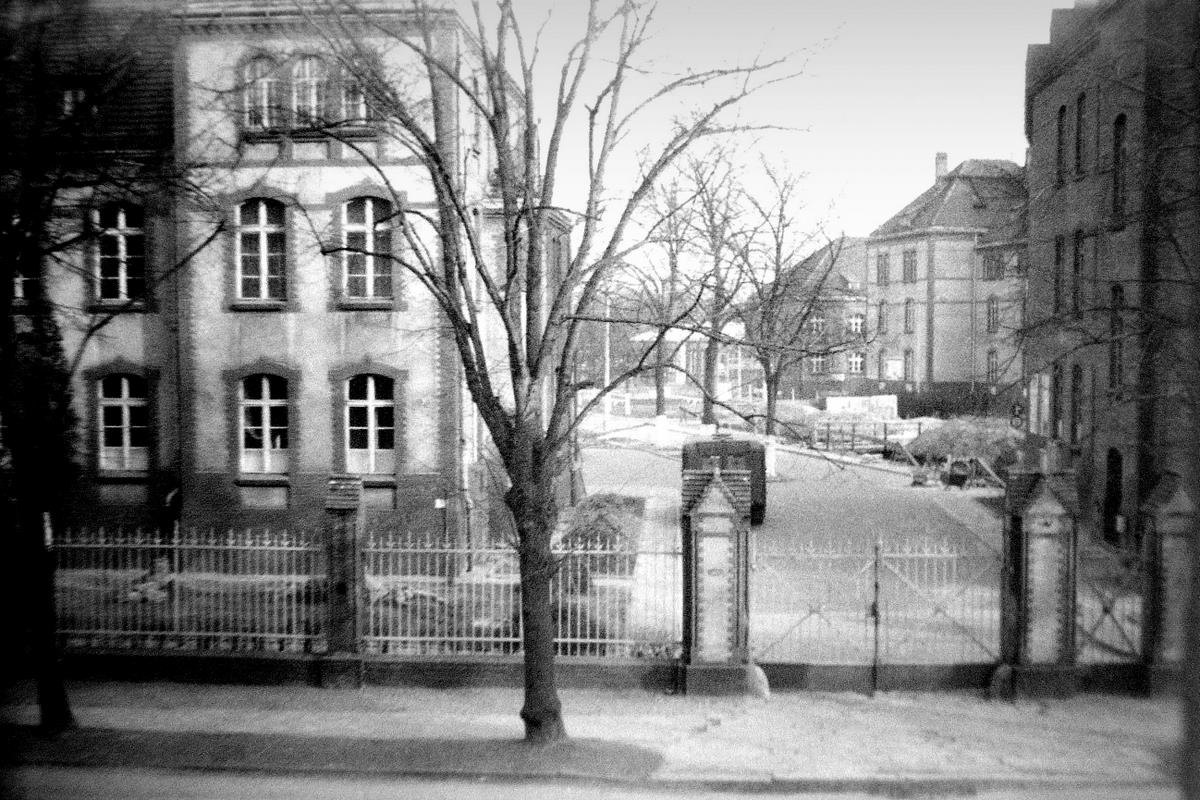
Polish Army Barracks in 1971

After the war Ostrów Wielkopolski was part of the Poznań Voivodeship, and from 1975 to 1998 it was the second largest city of the Kalisz Voivodeship (behind Kalisz).

In September 1945, the Polish resistance movement made an unsuccessful attempt to capture the local communist jail and liberate the prisoners. In July–August 1980, employees of local factories joined the nationwide anti-communist strikes, which led to the foundation of the "Solidarity" organization.

In 1979 Ostrów's city limits were widely expanded for the second time, including the former villages Pruślin, Szczygliczka, Zacharzew, Piaski, Stary Staw and Nowy Staw as new districts.

== Sights ==
Ostrów has a well-preserved city center, with such sights as:

- City hall (Ratusz) at the Market Square (Rynek), housing the local museum
- Ostrów Wielkopolski Co-Cathedral
- Virgin Mary Queen of Poland church
- I Liceum Ogólnokształcące, the city's oldest high school, and one of the most renowned high schools of Greater Poland
- Main Post Office
- Monument of Primate of Poland Mieczysław Halka-Ledóchowski
- Former synagogue

Places of interest outside the city center include:

- Old Cemetery (Stary Cmentarz), the oldest active Catholic cemetery in Poland
- New Cemetery (Nowy Cmentarz), opened in 1905, resting place of many distinguished figures of Ostrów, and Greater Poland insurgents, including the first fallen insurgent Jan Mertka
- Park 3 Maja (3 May Park)
- Park Miejski (Municipal Park)
- Ogród Bracki (Bracki Garden)
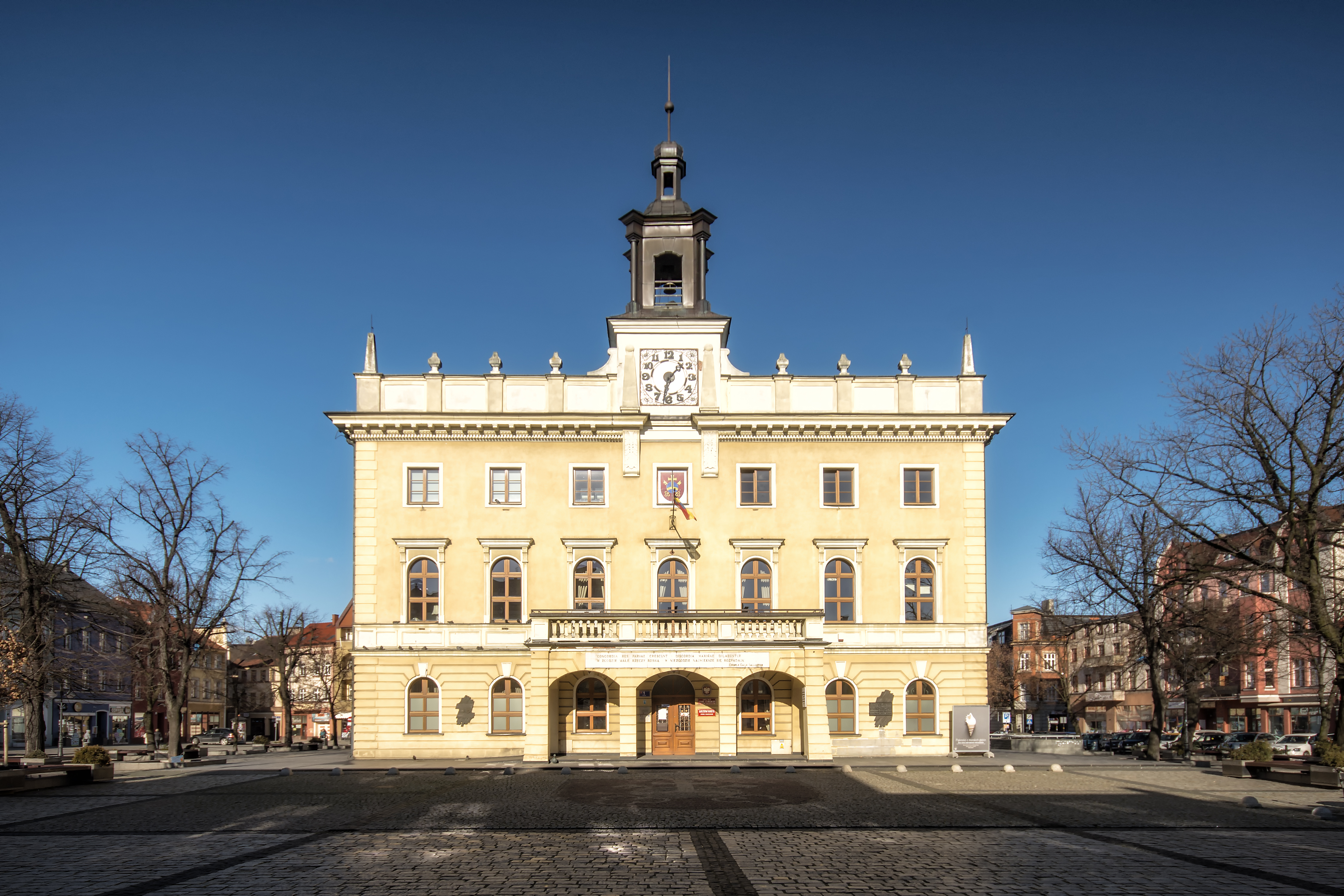
City hall at the Market Square

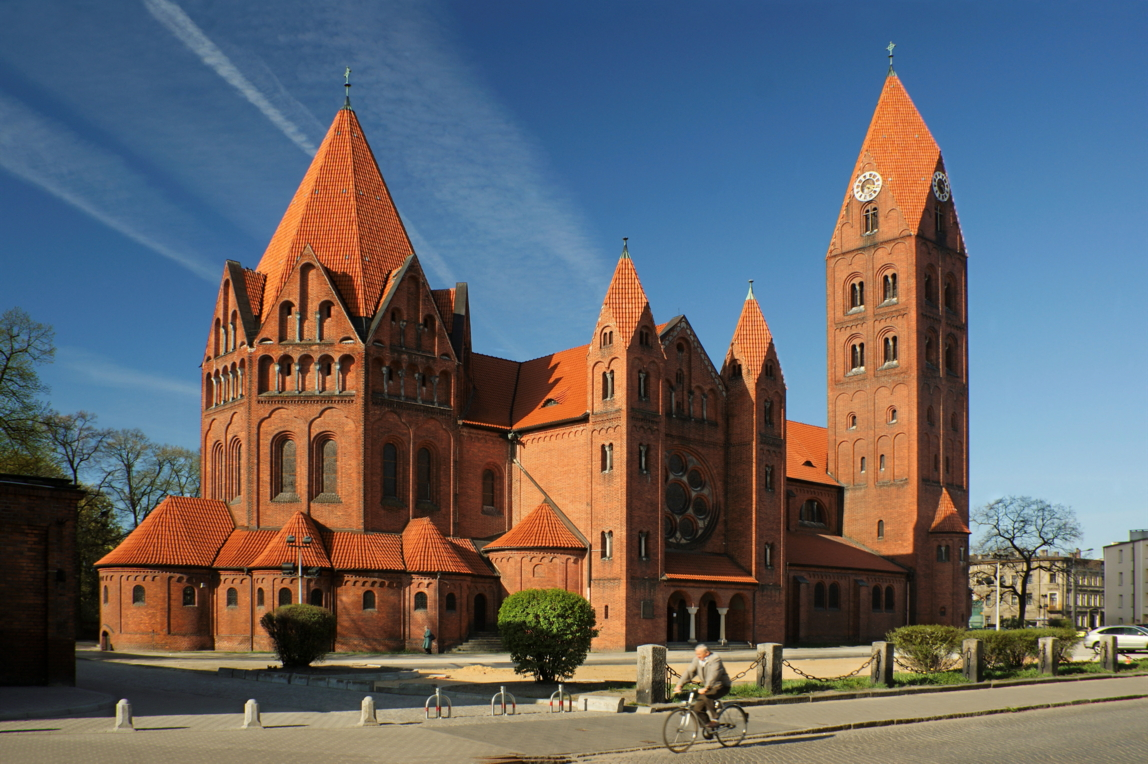
Ostrów Wielkopolski Co-Cathedral

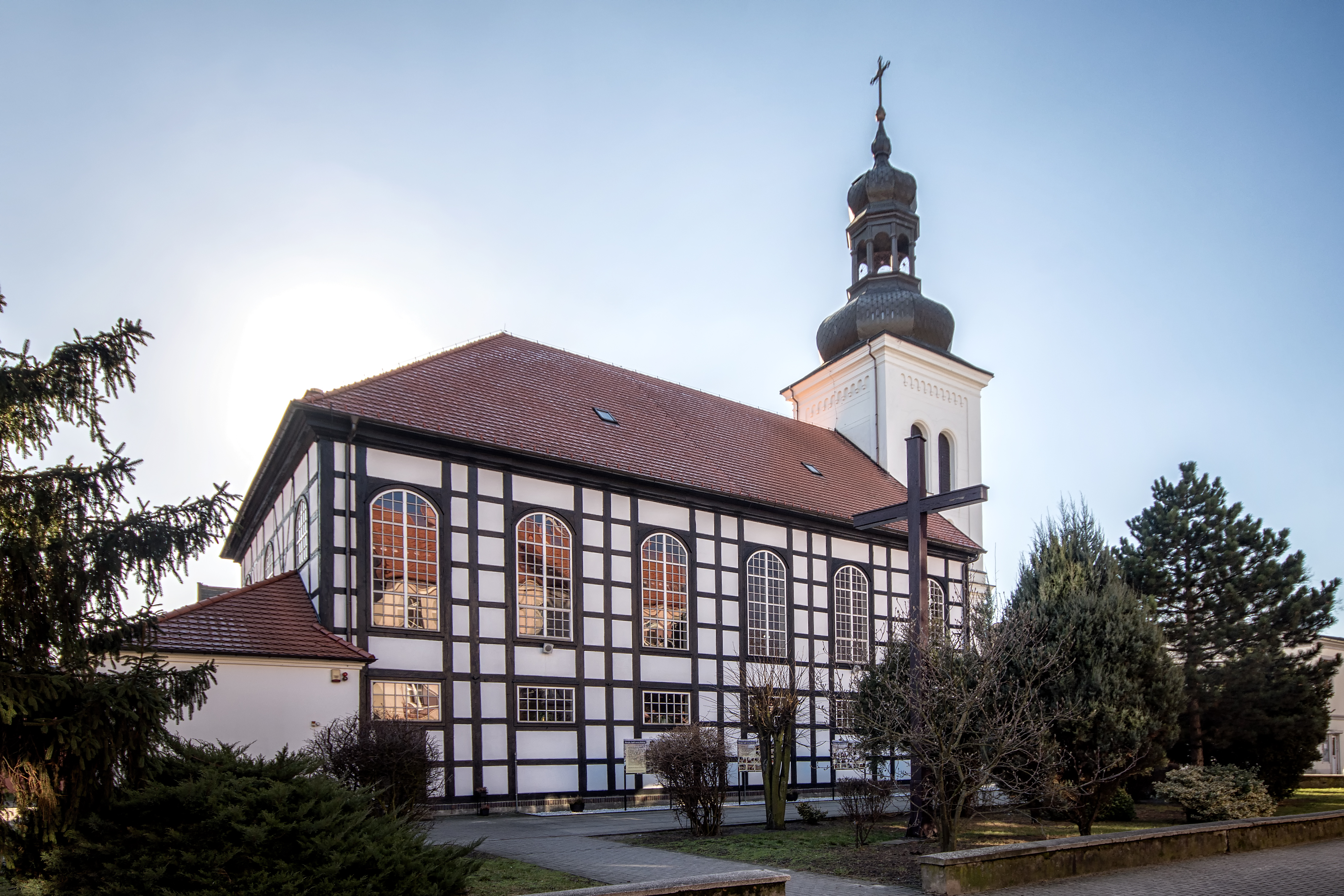
Virgin Mary Queen of Poland church

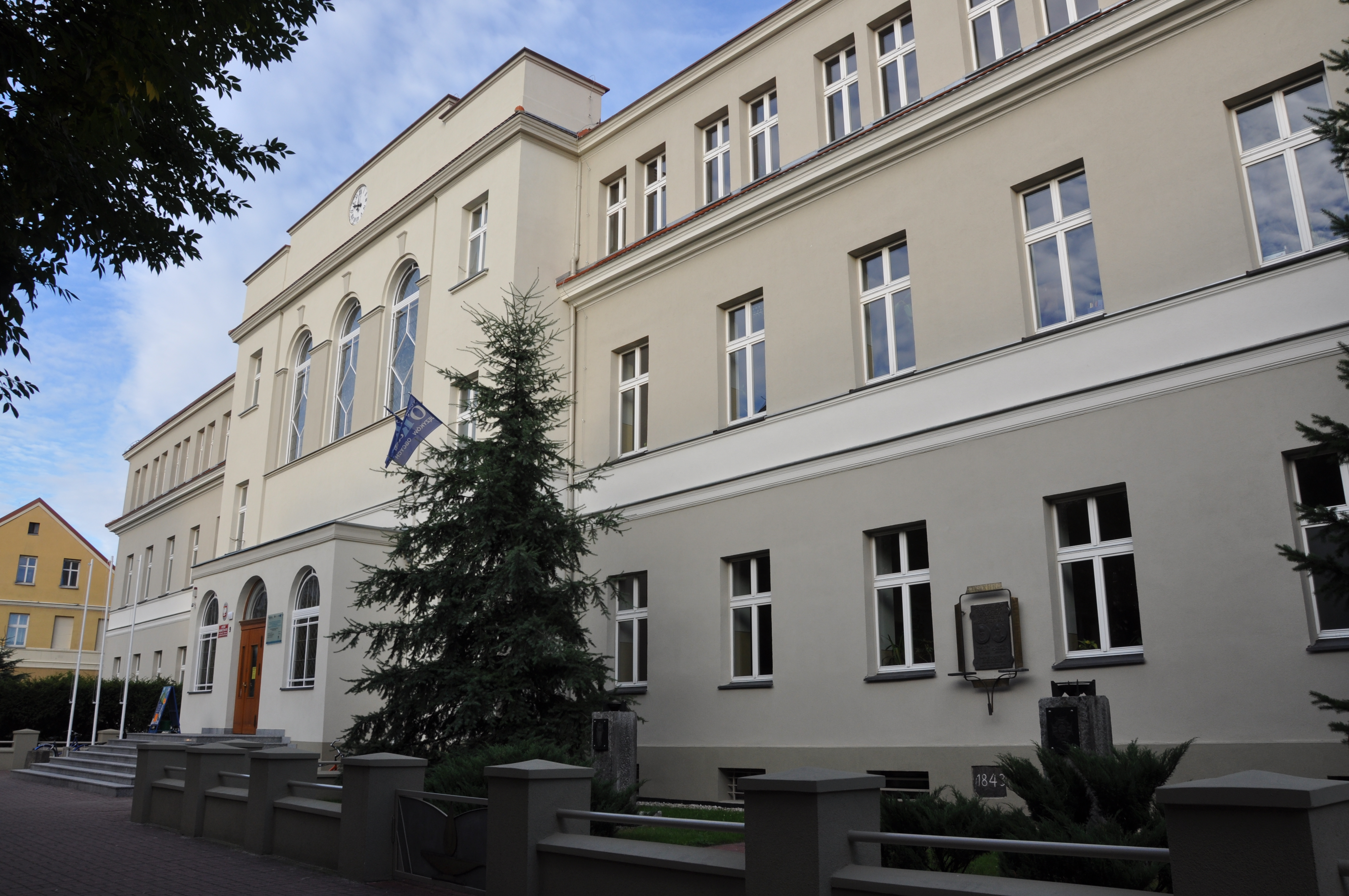
I Liceum Ogólnokształcące

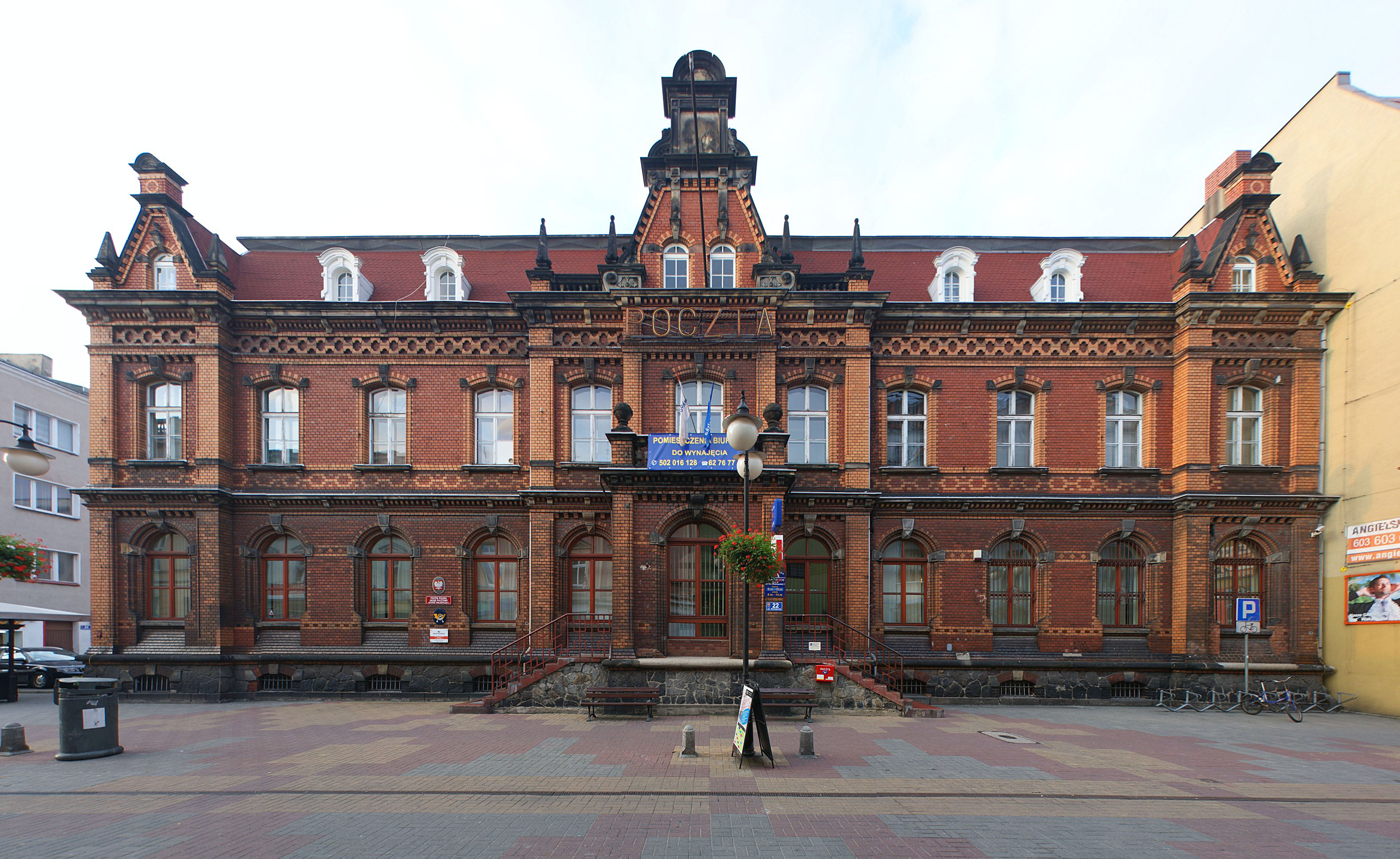
Main Post Office

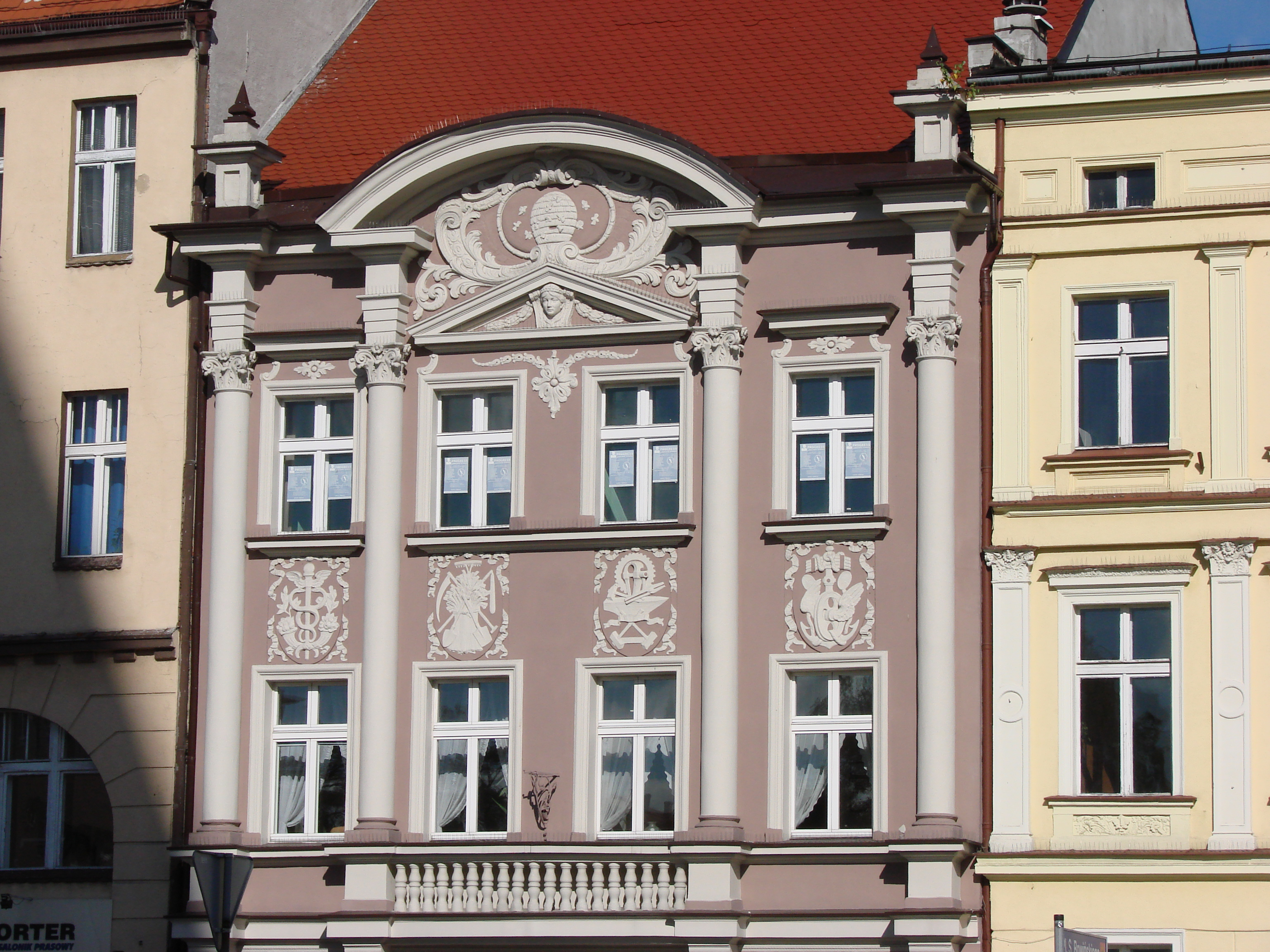
Facades of old townhouses in the city center

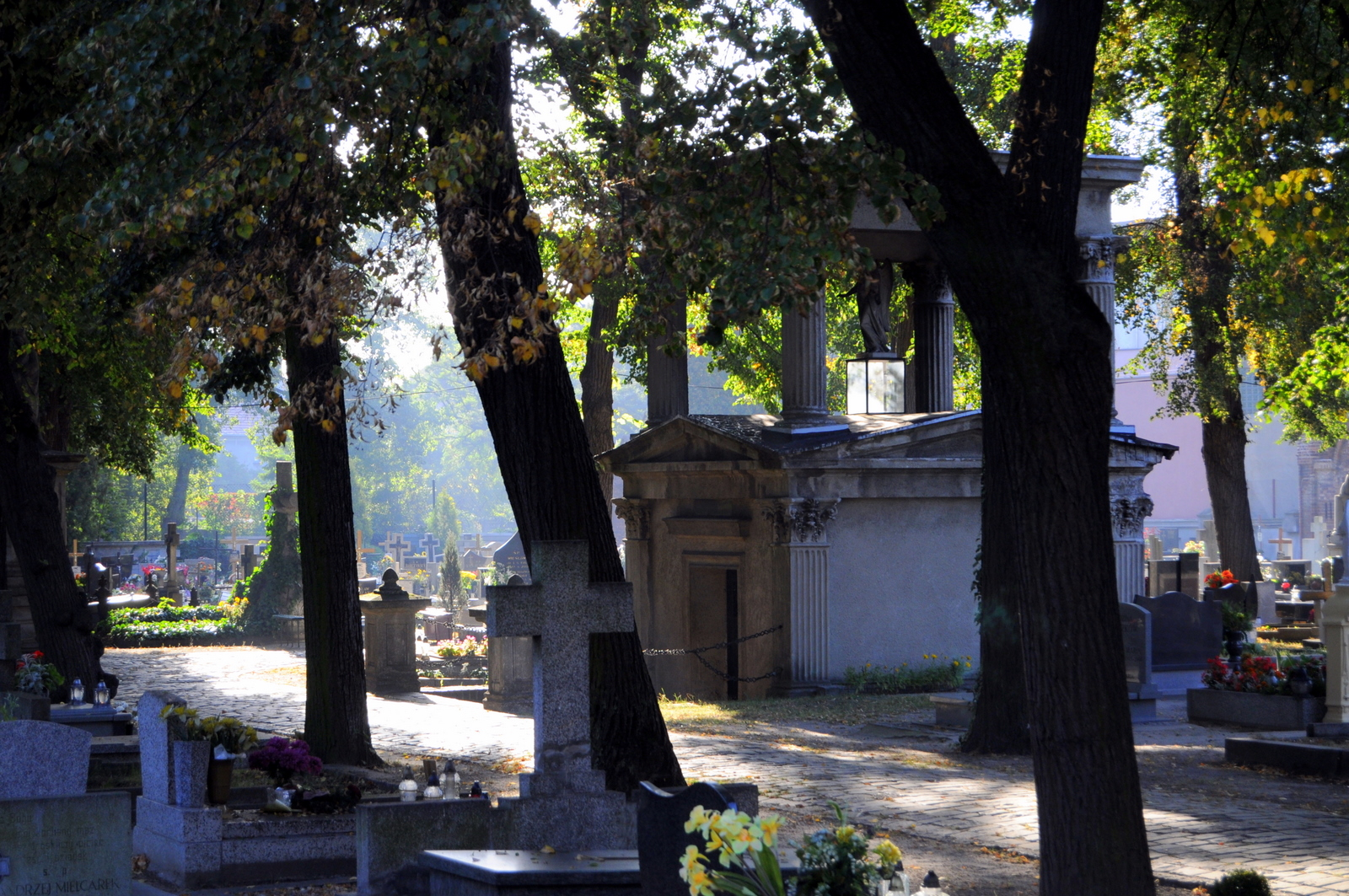
Old Cemetery

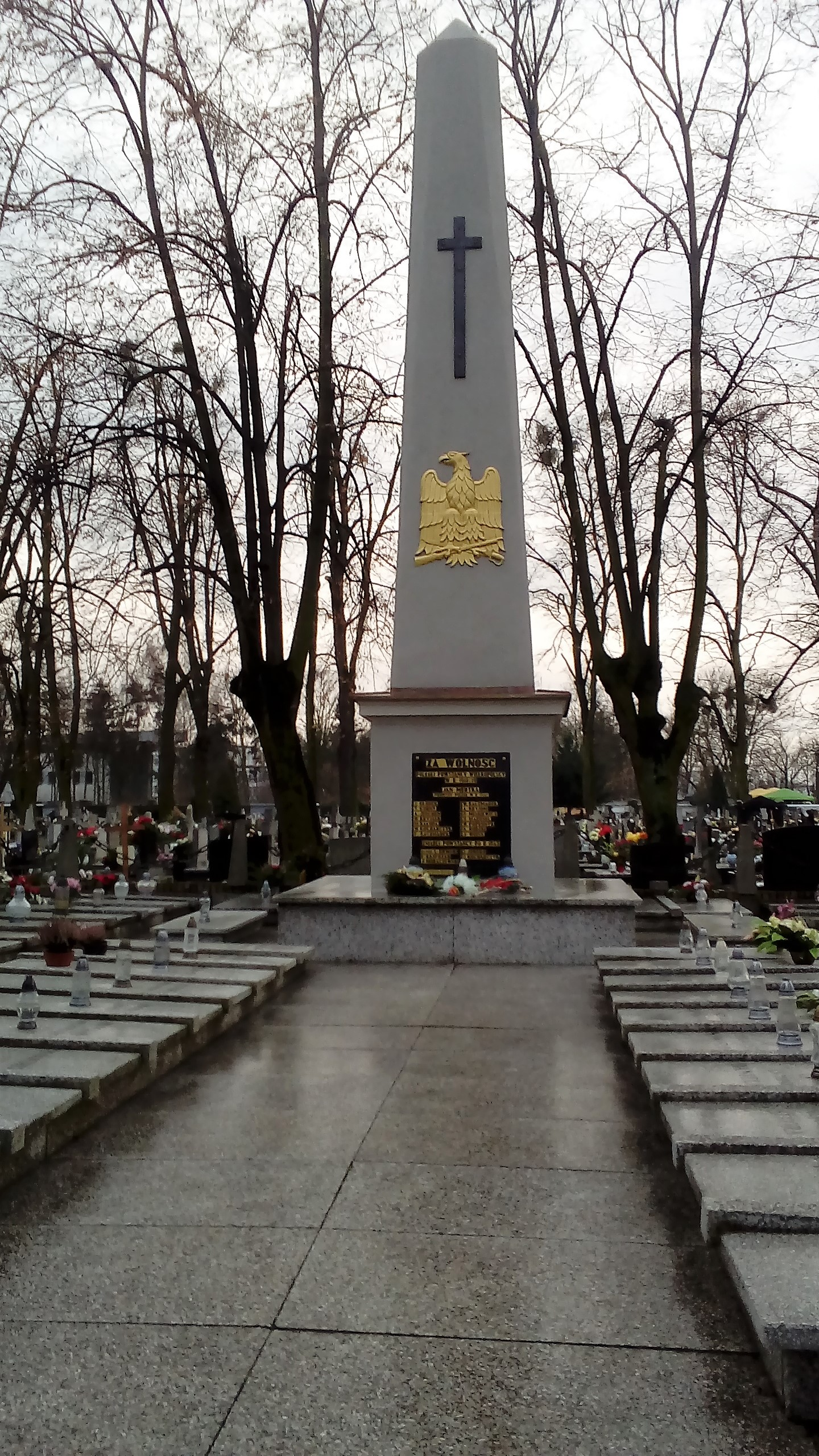
Graves of participants of the Greater Poland Uprising

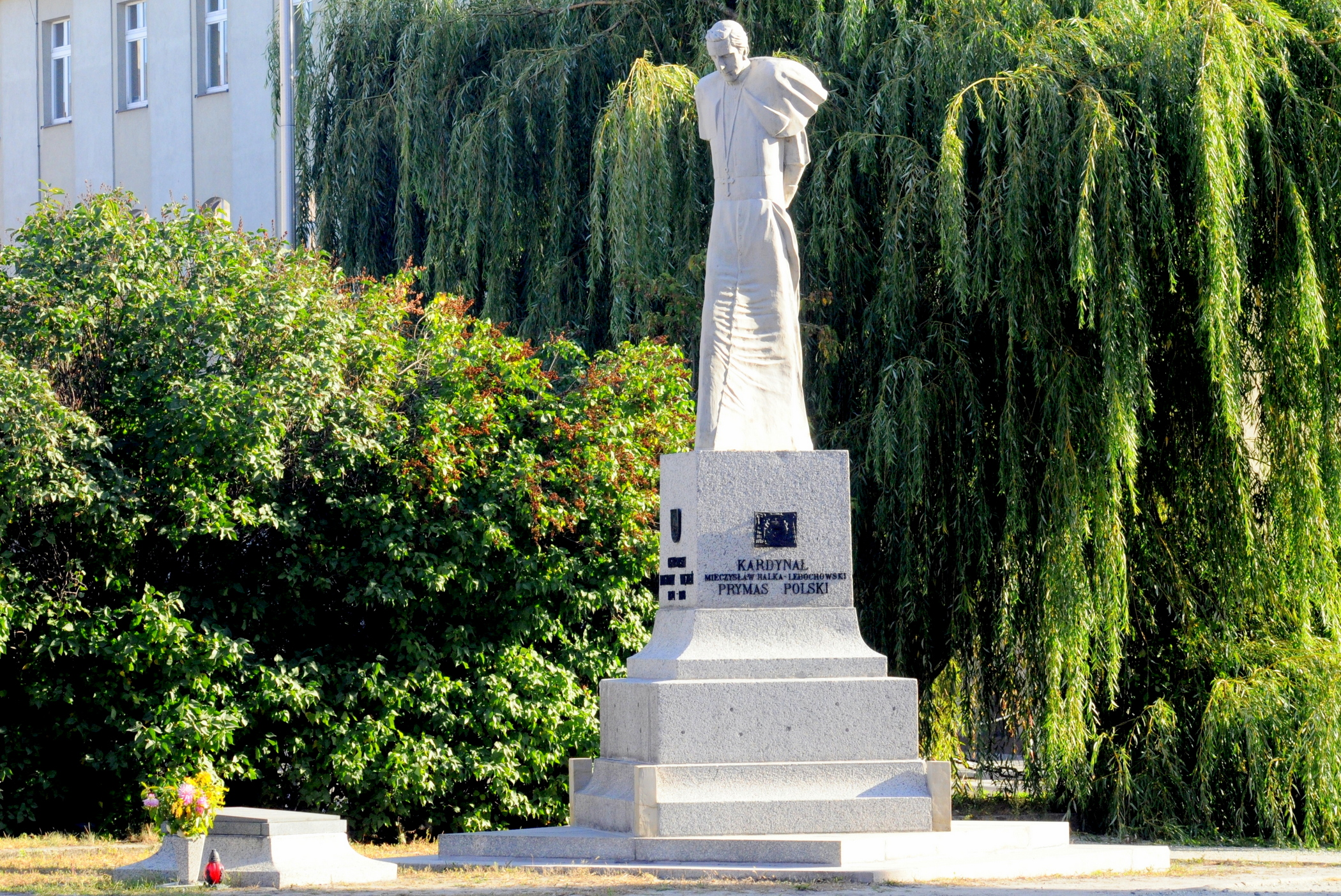
Monument of Mieczysław Halka-Ledóchowski

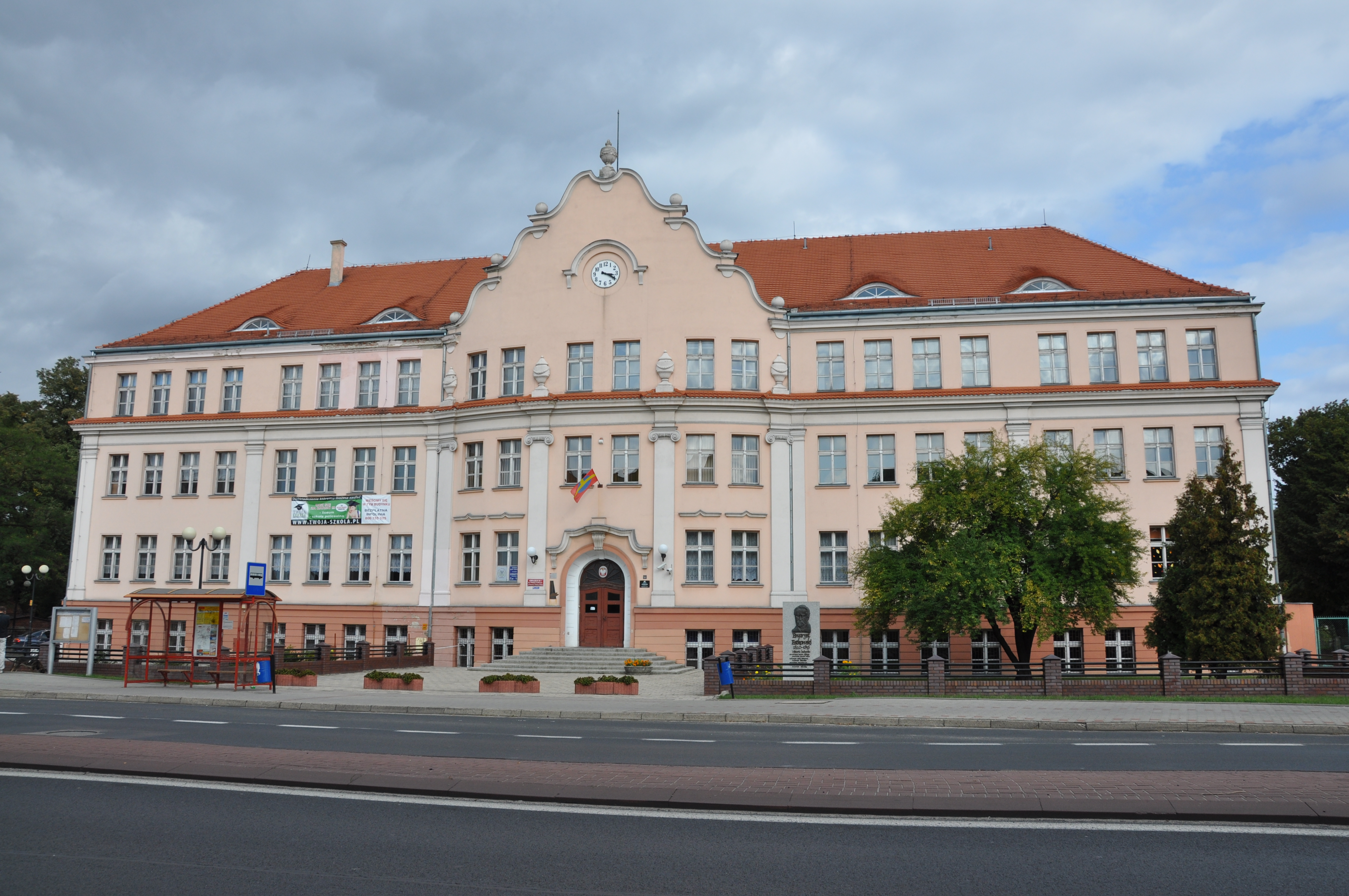
Elementary School No. 2

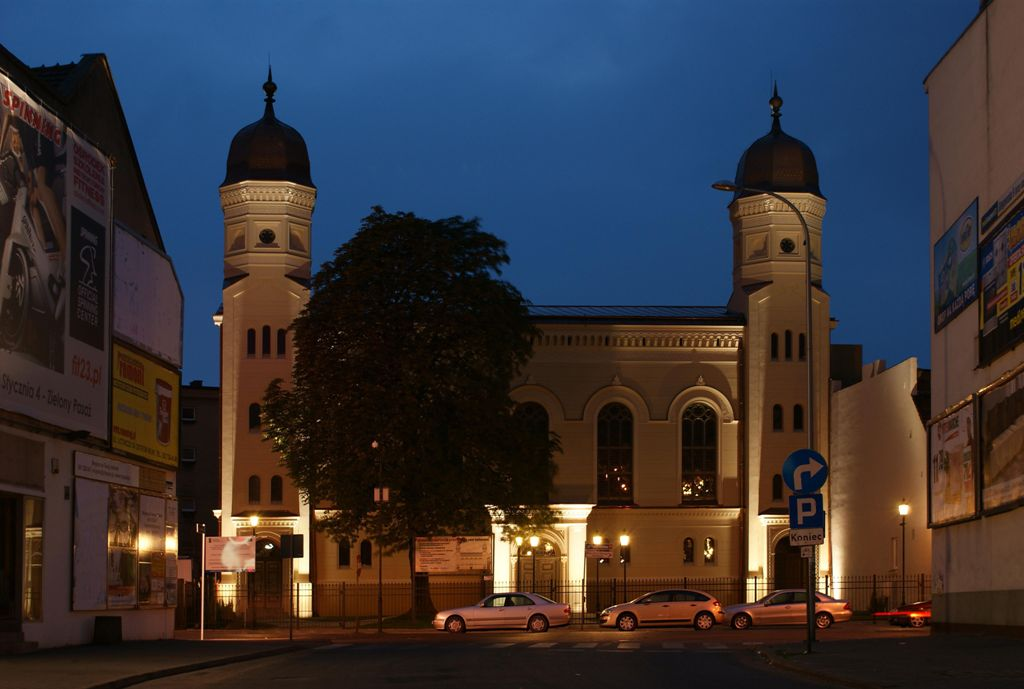
Former synagogue

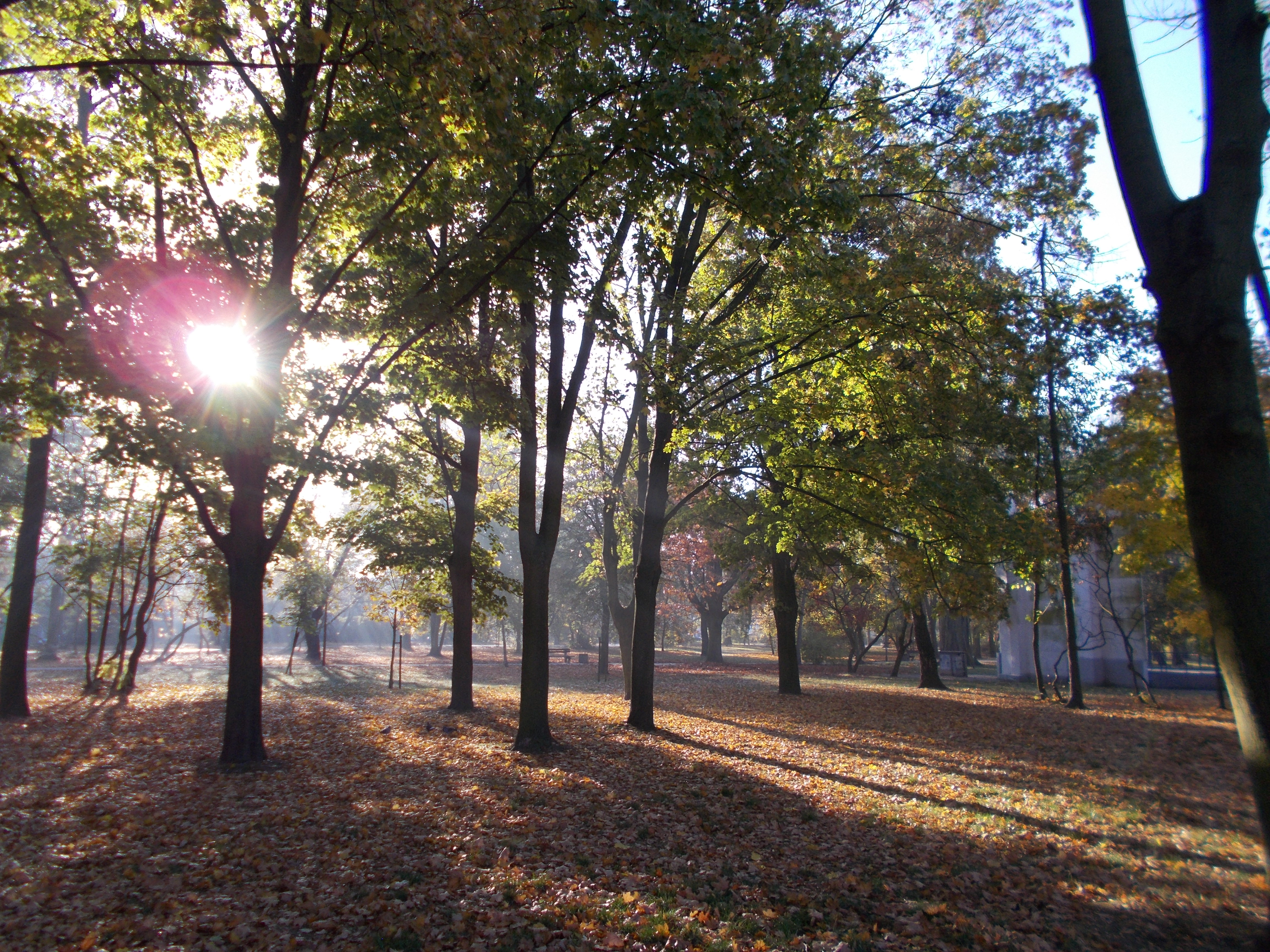
Park Miejski

== Transport ==
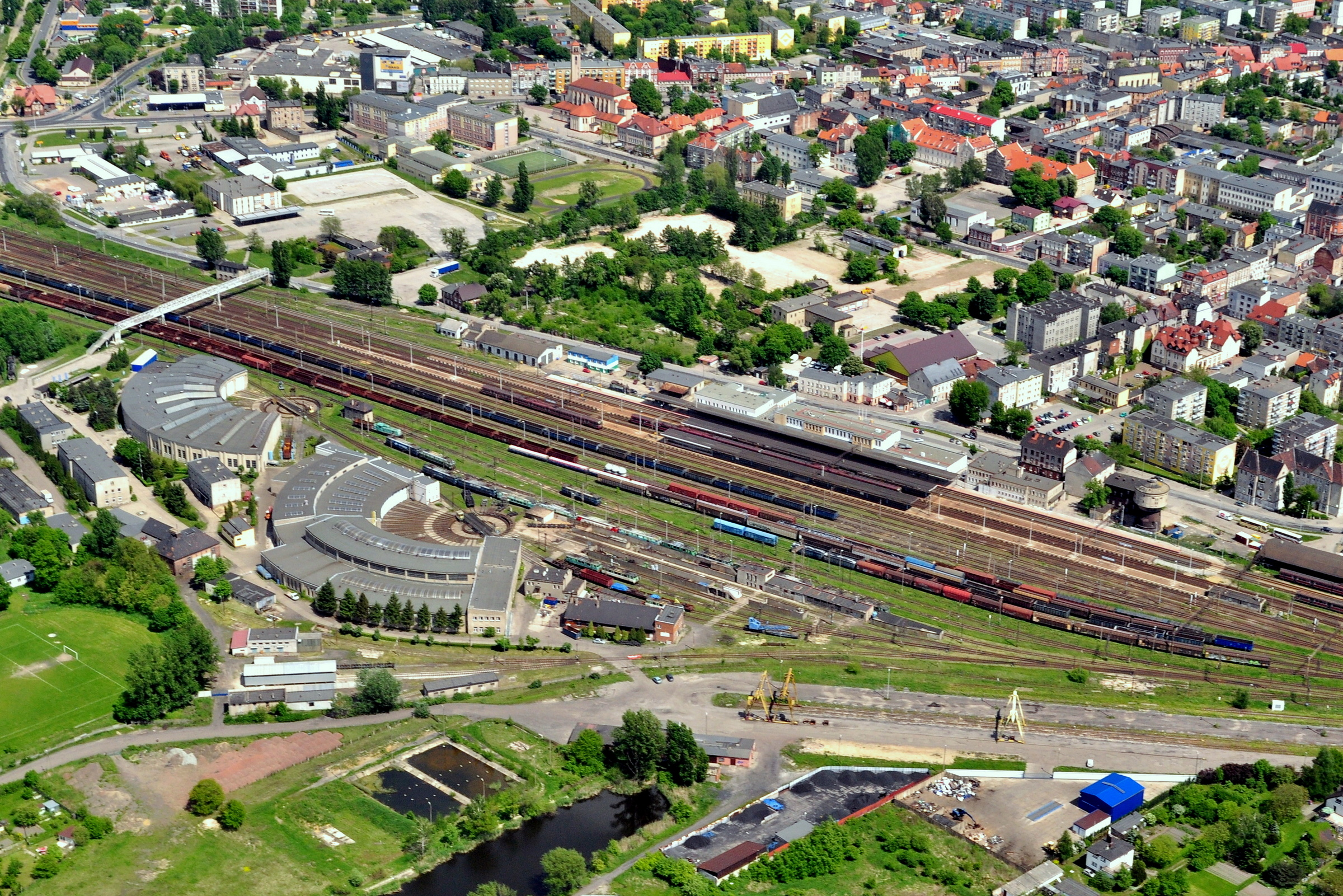
Aerial view of the main railway station

The S11 expressway bypasses Ostrów Wielkopolski to the east.

National road 36 passes through the town connecting it to Krotoszyn.

Ostrów Wielkopolski has a station on the Poznań-Opole railway line.

== Education ==
- Społeczna Wyższa Szkoła Przedsiębiorczości i Zarządzania in Łódź, branch in Ostrów Wlkp.
- Technical University of Łódź, branch in Ostrów Wlkp.

== Sports ==
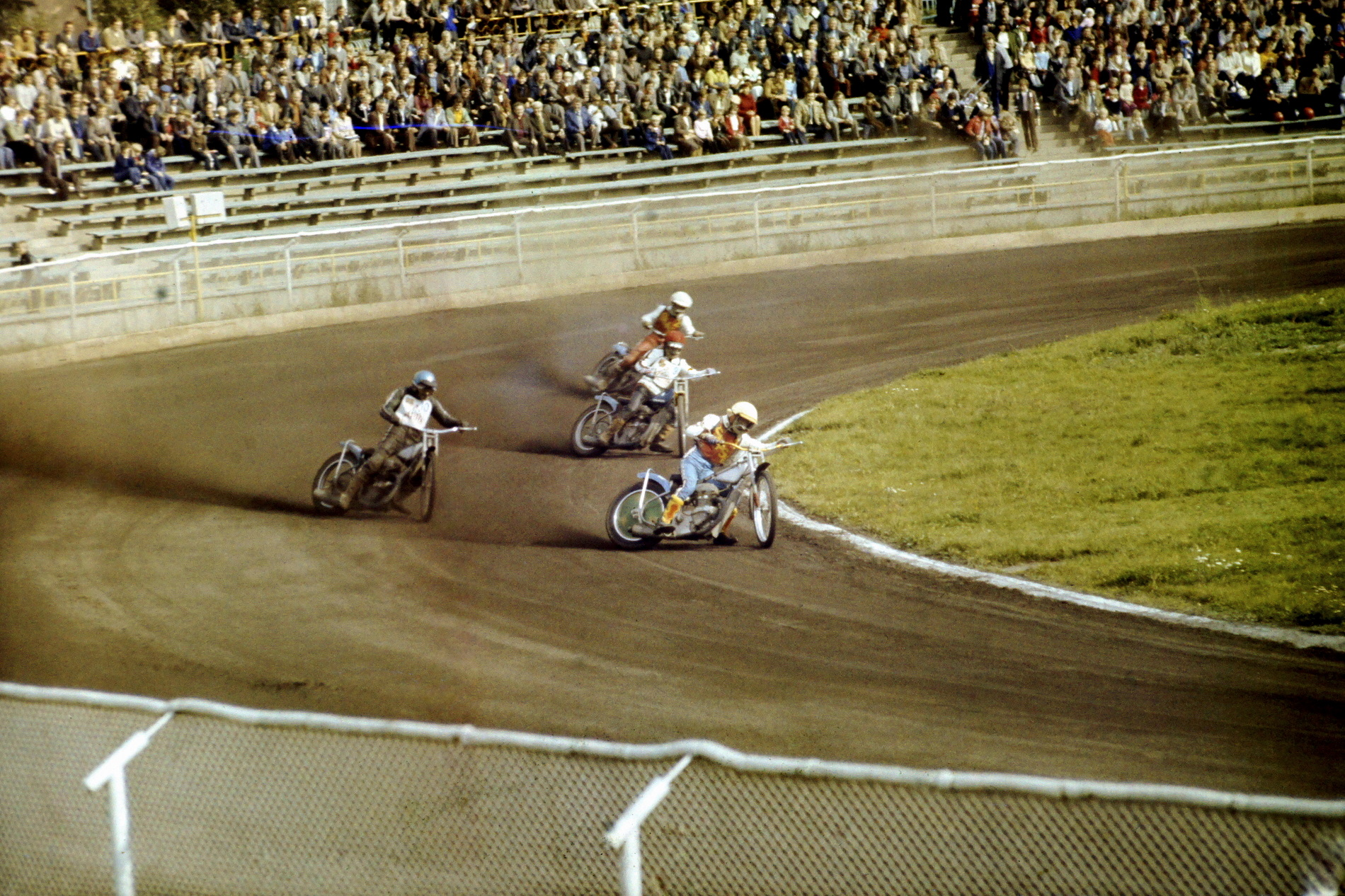
Speedway match between KM Ostrów Wielkopolski and Śląsk Świętochłowice in Ostrów in the 1980s

- Stal Ostrów Wielkopolski – men's basketball team, playing in the Polska Liga Koszykówki (top division), 2020–21 season champions, 2019 Polish Basketball Cup winners
- Ostrovia 1909 Ostrów Wielkopolski – men's soccer team, who play at the Ostrów Wielkopolski Municipal Stadium
- TZ Ostrovia Ostrów Wielkopolski – speedway team, who race at the Ostrów Wielkopolski Municipal Stadium
- Arged KPR Ostrovia Ostrów Wielkopolski – men's handball team, playing in the PGNiG Superliga (top division).

From 5 July to 20 July 2013 Ostrów Wielkopolski hosted the 17th European Gliding Championships. Local pilot Łukasz Błaszczyk took a bronze medal in the Club Class.

== Notable people ==
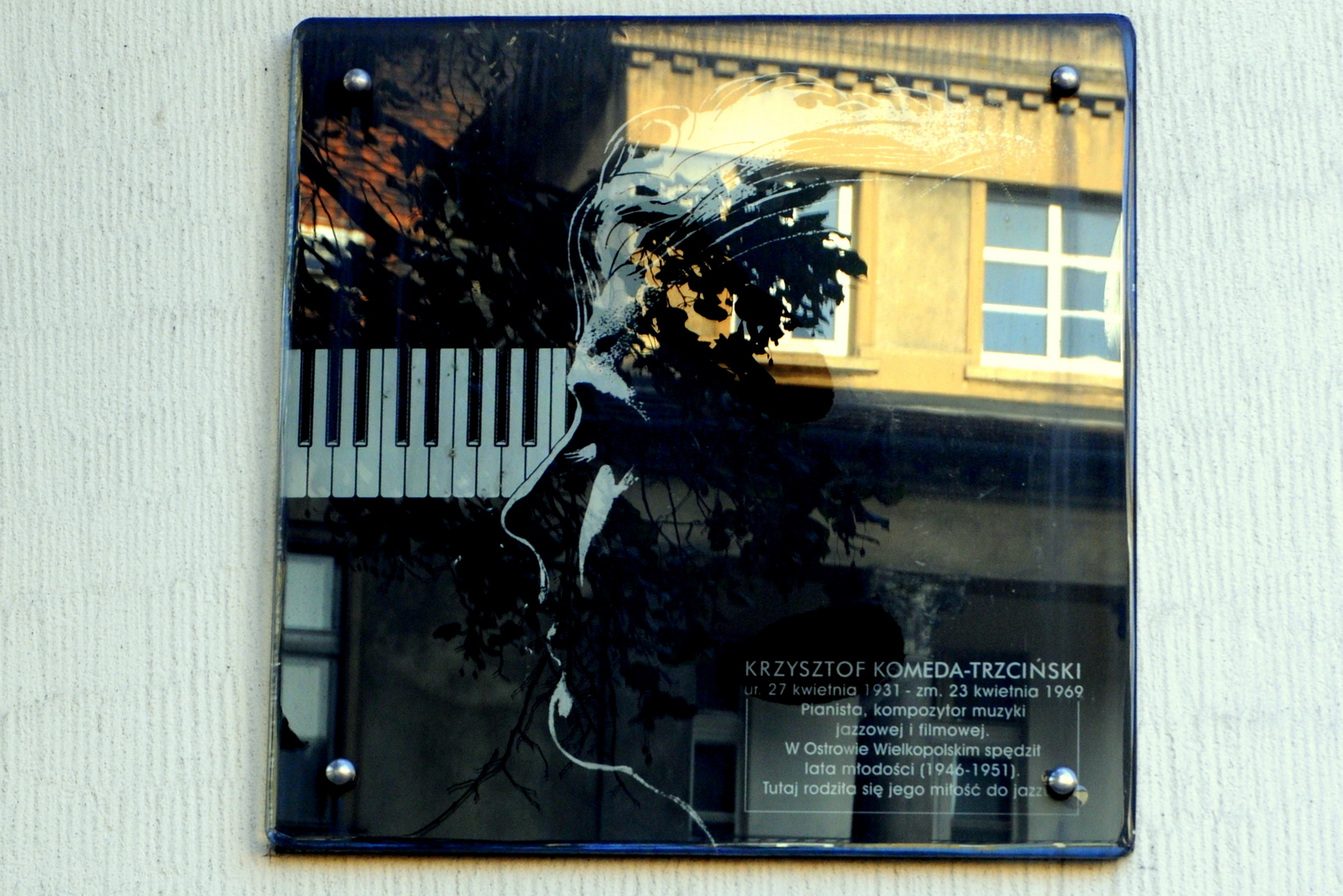
Memorial plaque to Krzysztof Komeda

- Bartłomiej Jaszka (born 1983), Polish handball player
- Krzysztof Komeda (1931–1969), Polish film score composer and jazz pianist
- Krzysztof Kwiatkowski (born 1971), computer scientist, researcher, software developer; former Minister of Justice
- Moritz Landé (1829–1888), German architect
- Krzysztof Lijewski (born 1983), Polish handball player
- Marcin Lijewski (born 1977), Polish handball player
- Paweł Marchewka (born 1973), entrepreneur, multi-billionaire and founder/CEO of video game developer Techland
- Władysław Marcinkowski (1858–1947), Polish sculptor
- Władysław Markiewicz (1920–2017), Polish sociologist
- Mateusz Ponitka (born 1993), Polish basketball player
- Bernhard Rawitz (1857–1932), German anatomist
- Manfred von Richthofen (1892–1918), "Red Baron", German fighter pilot (World War I); briefly stationed in the city's cavalry unit before being sent to the Western Front
- Jan Żniniewicz (1872–1952), Polish physician, author of the new method of hydrotherapy (balneological method of treatment of chronic rheumatic diseases)

== Twin towns – sister cities ==
Ostrów Wielkopolski is twinned with:

- Lecce, Italy
- Delitzsch, Germany
- Nordhausen, Germany
- Brantford, Canada
- Bergerac, France
