= Neil Williams (pilot) =

Welsh aerobatics pilot

- Born: 1934; Calgary, Alberta
- Died: 11 December 1977 (aged 42–43); Sierra de Guadarrama
- Cause of death: Air crash
- Education: Empire Test Pilots' School
- Spouse(s): Jean (1st wife), Lynn (2nd wife)
- Relatives: Elizabeth (daughter), David (son), Lynn (brother)
- Awards: Queen's Commendation for Valuable Service in the Air
- Aviation career
- Air force: RAF

Racing career
- Best position: Biancotto Trophy, FAI European Aerobatic Championships, Coupé Champion
- Aircraft: Stampe SV.4B, Zlín

Neil Williams (1934 – 11 December 1977) was a Welsh aerobatics pilot.

== Life and career ==
Williams was born in 1934 in Canada and educated in Wales, where he first learned to fly in 1951. After completing an engineering apprenticeship he joined the Royal Air Force (RAF), and was trained as a pilot in Canada, winning the course trophy and gaining his wings. He served in Cyprus as a Canberra photo-reconnaissance pilot, and returned to the United Kingdom in 1961, where he joined an experimental squadron. In 1962 he graduated from the Empire Test Pilots' School (ETPS), and also started competitive aerobatic flying. He won all the U.K. domestic competitions in 1965 and went on to compete in the World Aerobatic Championships (FAI WAC).

In 1965 he was the highest placed British pilot in the Lockheed Trophy, and was Europe's best biplane pilot when he flew a Stampe SV.4B to 4th place in the Top French competition. He gained another 'first' for Britain in the following year by reaching the finals of the FAI WAC, and in 1967, flying a standard two-seater Zlin Akrobat, he won the Biancotto Trophy. In 1970 he was awarded the Queen's Commendation for Valuable Service in the Air, when he successfully crash landed a Zlin after a wing folded during aerobatic training. Three weeks after receiving the replacement Zlin from Czechoslovakia, he reached 5th place in the FAI WAC, the highest place achieved by any Zlin pilot.

1974 was marked by the British teams' outright victory in the FAI European Aerobatic Championships and Neil's solo win in the Coupé Champion in France. In 1975 he became British Aerobatic Champion for the eleventh time, and in 1976 reached 4th place in the FAI WAC in Kiev. Captain of the British Aerobatic Team from 1966 until his death in 1977, he regularly flew at airshows and was best known for his displays in the Pitts Special, Rothmans Aerobatic Team, Spitfire, and the famous machines of the Shuttleworth Collection and for his test flying of unusual and tricky aeroplanes.

== Death ==
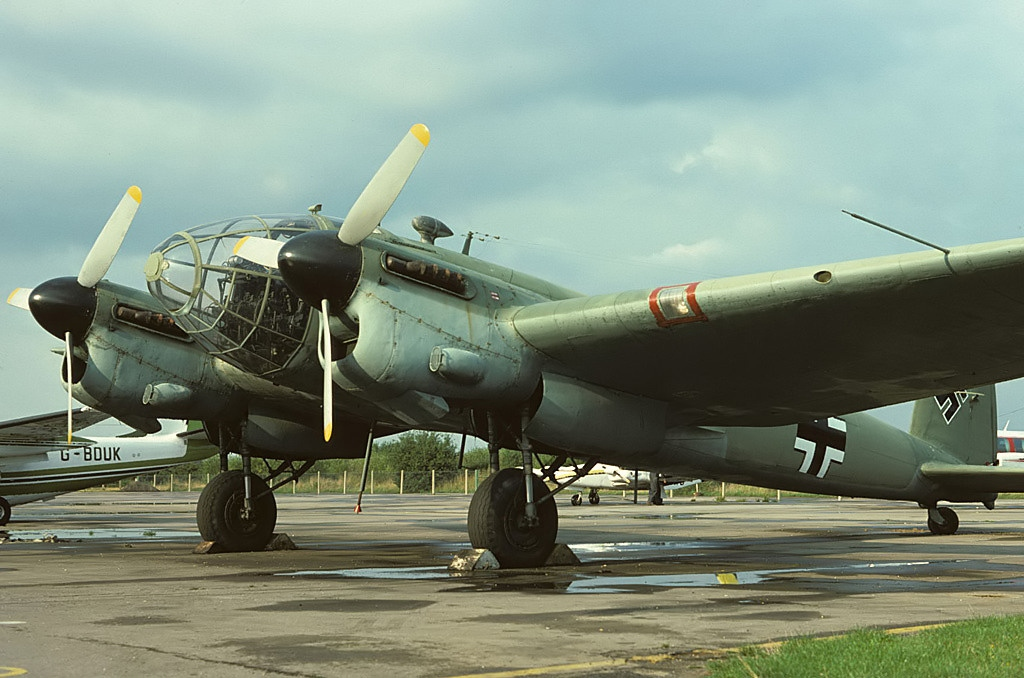
CASA 2.111 (Spanish-built Heinkel He 111) of the type Williams was in when he was killed

He was killed, along with three others, on 11 December 1977, when the CASA 2.111 he was ferrying from Cuatro Vientos Airport to the United Kingdom crashed in poor visibility into the Sierra de Guadarrama mountains north of Madrid. The other deceased were his second wife, Lynn, Blackbushe Airport Chief Engineer (retired), Joseph Donaghy, and Blackbushe Ground Controller, Stephen Parnell.

The British Aerobatic Association organized the Neil Williams Memorial Trophy.

== See also ==
- Competition aerobatics
