= Sergey Rakhmanin =

Russian air racer

- Born: October 18, 1961 (age 64)
- Aviation career

Racing career
- First race: 2007
- Best position: 11th (2008)
- Aircraft: MX Aircraft MXS
- Website: sergeyrakhmanin.com

Sergey Stanislavovich Rakhmanin (Russian: Сергей Станиславович Рахманин) (born October 18, 1961 in Karl-Marx-Stadt, Germany) is a Russian powered and glider aerobatic pilot and flight instructor.

== Powered aerobatic competitions ==
In 1991, he became the last USSR Absolute Aerobatic Champion. Sergei Rakhmanin won the title in the overall category of FAI European Aerobatic Championships in 1999 and FAI World Aerobatic Championships in 2003 and in 2005.

== Glider aerobatic competitions ==
He won the bronze medal in the 1995 World Glider Aerobatic Championships and the team gold together with Mikhail Mamistov and Victor Tchmal. Additionally, he won the team gold medal in the 1996 European Glider Aerobatic Championships together with Mikhail Mamistov and Sergei Krikalev.

== Red Bull Air Races ==
He raced in 2007 and 2008 Red Bull Air Race World Championships.

Sergey Rakhmanin at the Red Bull Air Race World Series
Year	1	2	3	4	5	6	7	8	9	10	11	12	Points	Wins	Rank
2007	(United Arab Emirates); 12th	(Brazil); 9th	(United States); 9th	(Turkey); 10th	(Spain); CAN	(Switzerland); 13th	(United Kingdom); 10th	(Hungary); 11th	(Portugal); 10th	(United States); 11th	(Mexico); CAN	(Australia); 11th	0	0	12th
2008	(United Arab Emirates); 10th	(United States); 11th	(United States); 10th	(Sweden); CAN	(Netherlands); 9th	(United Kingdom); 12th	(Hungary); 9th	(Portugal); 11th	(Spain); CAN	(Australia); 11th			2	0	11th
2009	(United Arab Emirates); 6th	(United States); 8th	(Canada); 5th	(Hungary); 15th	(Portugal); 13th	(Spain); 13th							17	0	11th
2010	(United Arab Emirates); 15th	(Australia); 12th	(Brazil); 14th	(Canada); 8th	(United States); 12th	(Germany); 14th	(Hungary); CAN	(Portugal); CAN					4	0	13th

Legend:

- CAN: Cancelled
- DNP: Did not participate
- DNS: Did not show
- DQ: Disqualified
- NC: Not classified

== Awards and honours ==
He is awarded "Honored Master of Sport of Russia", and received in 2006 the FAI Air Sport Medal.

== Family ==
He lives in St. Petersburg, Russia and is married with one child.

== See also ==
- Competition aerobatics
- FAI World Aerobatic Championships
- FAI European Aerobatic Championships
