= Rob Holland (pilot) =

American pilot (1974–2025)

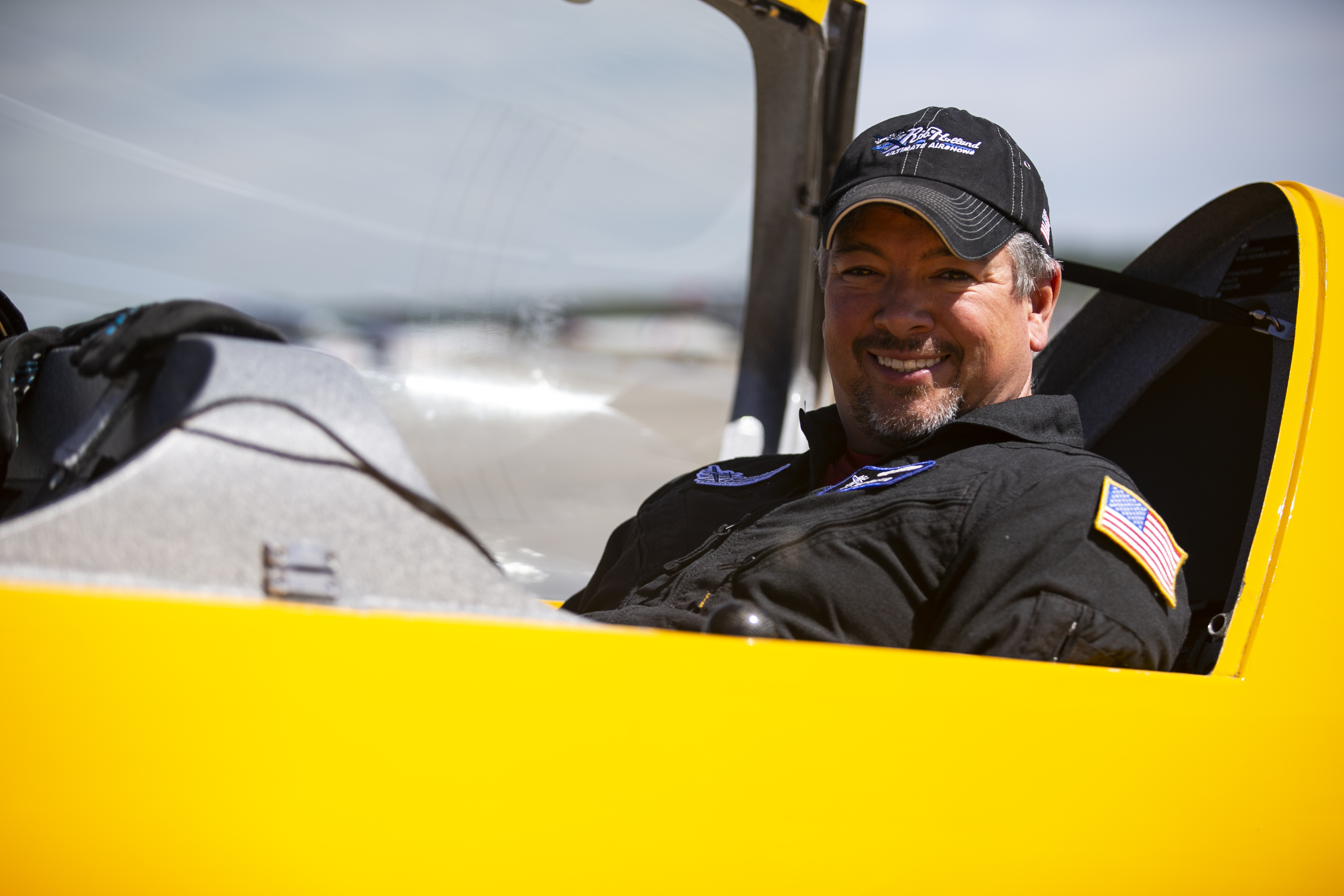
- Holland preparing to fly in the 2019 MCAS Beaufort Air Show
- Born: May 30, 1974; Norton, Massachusetts, U.S.
- Died: April 24, 2025 (aged 50); Langley Air Force Base, Hampton, Virginia, U.S.
- Cause of death: Plane crash
- Education: Daniel Webster College
- Years active: 2002–2025
- Known for: Airshow performances; Competition aerobatics
- Website: www.ultimateairshows.com

Robert Joseph Holland Jr. (May 30, 1974 – April 24, 2025) was an American aerobatic pilot. He performed in airshows from 2002 until his death in a crash at Langley Air Force Base on April 24, 2025, during preparations for an upcoming performance.

== Biography ==
Holland enrolled at Daniel Webster College where he earned his Bachelor of Science Degrees in Aviation Flight Operations and Aviation Management. He also earned his pilot ratings from the same institution. Soon after obtaining his pilot certificate, he began actively learning aerobatics.

Beginning in 2002, Holland was an active participant in airshows.

Holland's formation aerobatic skills were showcased through his performances with both the Firebirds Xtreme team and The 4CE (Force) aerobatic team.

In 2012, Holland was awarded the International Council of Air Shows prestigious Art Scholl Award for Showmanship recipient.

Holland was also an active member of the competition aerobatics community from 2001 on. He represented the USA as a member of the U.S. Advanced Aerobatic team and the U.S. Unlimited Aerobatic Team.

On March 25, 2018 Holland was uninjured following a forced landing at the abandoned Kalt Ranch Airport in Fulton, TX. His MX Aircraft MXS was substantially damaged in the accident, the NTSB determined the probable cause to be a total loss of engine power due to the fatigue failure of the crankshaft, which resulted in the pilot's forced landing to an abandoned airport and the airplane's subsequent impact with debris on the runway.

Holland's championship titles include Six-time World 4-minute Freestyle Aerobatic Champion, Thirteen-time consecutive U.S. National Aerobatic Champion, and Fourteen-time U.S. 4-minute Freestyle Aerobatic Champion. In addition, he won the 2015 World Air Games Freestyle Gold Medal and was the 2008 World Advanced Aerobatic Champion. He was also the recipient of the Charlie Hillard Trophy five times (in 2013, 2017, 2019, 2022, and 2024) and the Eric Müller Trophy in 2019. He also won 38 medals in international competition, including 14 gold medals. In 2024 he achieved a bronze medal podium finish at the World Aerobatic Championships in Poland.

Holland is the only pilot in history to win: Six World 4-minute Freestyle titles, Thirteen consecutive U.S. National titles, and Fourteen total U.S. 4-minute Freestyle titles.

== Career highlights ==
- 2019 Eric Müller Trophy Recipient
- 6 Time World Freestyle Aerobatic Champion in 2011, 2013, 2015, 2017, 2019, 2024
- 13 Time U.S. National Aerobatic Champion in 2011, 2012, 2013, 2014, 2015, 2016, 2017, 2018, 2019, 2021, 2022, 2023, 2024
- 14 Time U.S. National Freestyle Aerobatic Champion in 2008, 2011, 2012, 2013, 2014, 2015, 2016, 2017, 2018, 2019, 2021, 2022, 2023, 2024
- 2021 Honorary member of First Flight Society
- 2019 named Honorary Blue Angel
- 2018 Society of Honorary Snowbirds Inductee
- 5 Time recipient of the Charlie Hillard Trophy 2013, 2017, 2019, 2022, and 2024
- 2016 Sky Grand Prix Aerobatic Freestyle Gold Medalist
- 2015 World Air Games Aerobatic Freestyle Gold Medalist
- 2012 Recipient of the Art Scholl Award for Showmanship
- 2008 World Advanced Aerobatic Champion
- 2006 World Advanced Aerobatic Championships Silver Medalist
- U.S. Aerobatic Team Captain 2013, 2017, 2019, 2022, 2024
- U.S. Unlimited Aerobatic Team Member 2011, 2013, 2015, 2017, 2019, 2022, 2024
- U.S. Advanced Aerobatic Team Member 2004, 2006 and 2008

== Aircraft ==
Holland flew over 180 different types of aircraft. He flew multiple types in his airshows and aerobatic competition career.

=== Pitts S-2C ===
In 2002, Holland commenced his airshow career in a Pitts S-2C, which he also utilized for aerobatic instruction at Aerial Advantage Aviation, his flight school in Nashua, New Hampshire. He flew the aircraft in the advanced category at aerobatic competitions, winning several regional contests and qualifying for his first U.S. Aerobatic Team in 2003. Holland continued to fly the Pitts S-2C in competitions and airshows until 2005.

=== Ultimate 20-300S ===
From 2005 to 2007, Holland flew the Ultimate 20-300S, a two-seat experimental aerobatic biplane with a high-powered AEIO-540 engine, in airshows and aerobatic competitions. He flew a borrowed single-seat Ultimate 10-300S at the World Advanced Aerobatic Championships (AWAC) in 2004 and 2006, earning a Silver medal finish in the 2006 competition.

=== MX2 ===
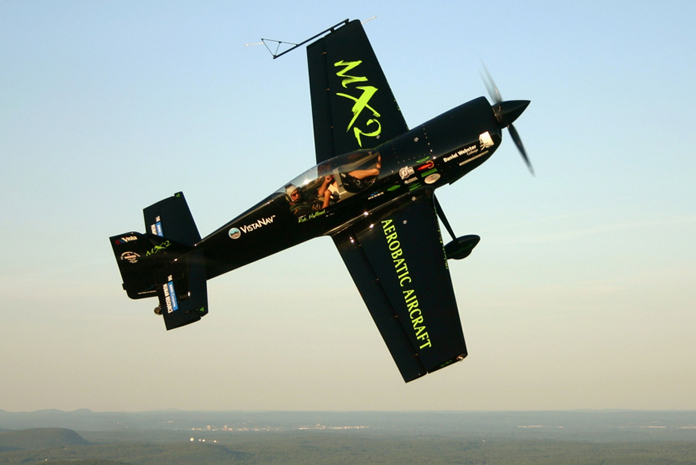
Holland flying his MX2 in 2007

In 2007, Holland acquired an MX2 (serial number 002), which he flew in aerobatic competitions and airshows until 2011. He earned a Gold medal finish in the 2008 World Advanced Aerobatic Championships and his first U.S. National Aerobatic Freestyle title in the same year. Holland also qualified for the 2011 U.S. Unlimited Aerobatic Team while flying the MX2 in the 2010 U.S. National Aerobatic Championships.

=== MXS-RH ===
Later in his career, Holland's aerobatic aircraft of choice was the all-carbon-fiber MXS-RH, which he began flying in 2011. The MXS-RH is a one-of-a-kind, American designed, single-seat competition and airshow-ready aerobatic airplane, designed and built by MX Aircraft with modifications suggested by Holland himself. The aircraft was powered by a Lycoming AEIO-540 engine generating 380 horsepower and weighing a minimal 1200 pounds, with the capability of pulling 16 positive and negative Gs and rolling at almost 500 degrees per second. Holland won numerous World Aerobatic Freestyle Championships and eleven of his twelve U.S. Nationals Aerobatic Champion titles in the MXS, as well as eleven of his thirteen U.S. Nationals Aerobatic Freestyle Champion titles.

== Maneuvers developed ==
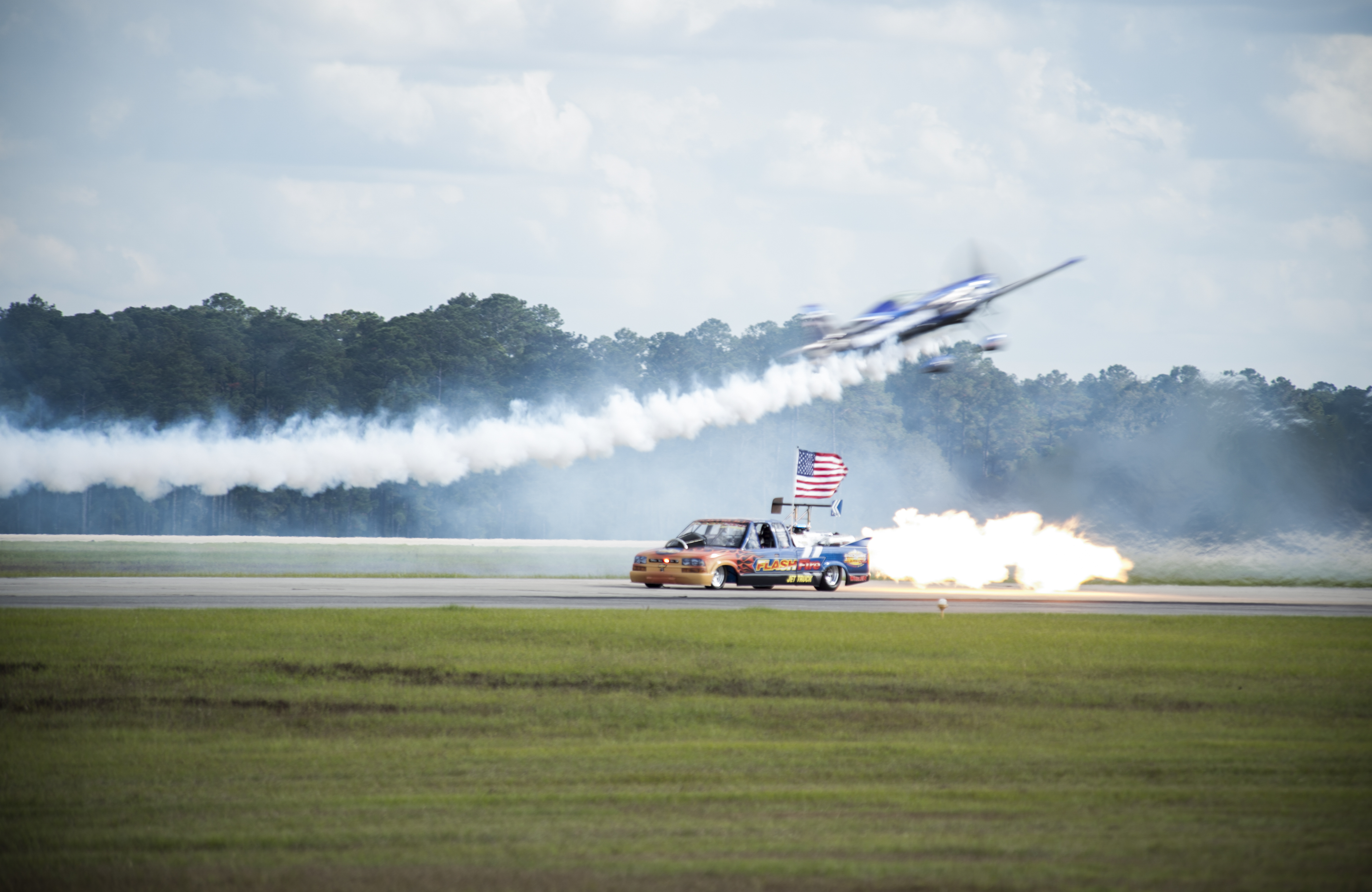
Holland flying over a jet-powered truck during a 2015 performance

Holland is credited with the invention and introduction of many innovative aerobatic maneuvers.

=== Inside Tumble ===
The Inside Tumble is an aerobatic maneuver in which the aircraft rotates around its lateral axis in a positive pitching motion while traveling along a ballistic path with the illusion of being yawed nearly 90 degrees to the relative wind. Flown by World Champion Ramon Alonso and others before being made famous by Holland.

=== Frisbee ===
While in level horizontal flight, the aircraft is rotated in the yaw axis 360 degrees (like a frisbee) and then continues along the same level horizontal flight path.

=== Inverted Frisbee ===
Similar to the Frisbee except the aircraft yaws 360 degrees in level inverted horizontal flight.

=== Nivek ===
The "Nivek" is a collaborative creation involving American Aerobatic Pilot Kevin Coleman, whose name is spelled backwards in the maneuver's title. The Nivek begins with an aggressive pitch at the top of a vertical line, transitioning the aircraft to a level inverted flight. The aircraft is then pitched negatively 360 degrees in place, returning it to a level inverted attitude. After that, the aircraft performs a one and one-quarter rolling spin, finishing the maneuver inverted on a 45-degree down line.

=== Forward Endo ===
The Forward Endo is a maneuver where the aircraft rapidly pitches nose downward along its lateral axis, rotating over 540 degrees around that same axis, all while giving the impression of being stationary in space. This maneuver is commonly used in figures like the "Cardiac Express" and the "Typhoon Tumble".

=== Rolling Spin ===
During the Rolling Spin, the aircraft is in a fully stalled state. It is simultaneously in a fully developed spin while also rolling around its longitudinal axis. Flown by Xavier De Lapparent in the 90s.

== Death ==
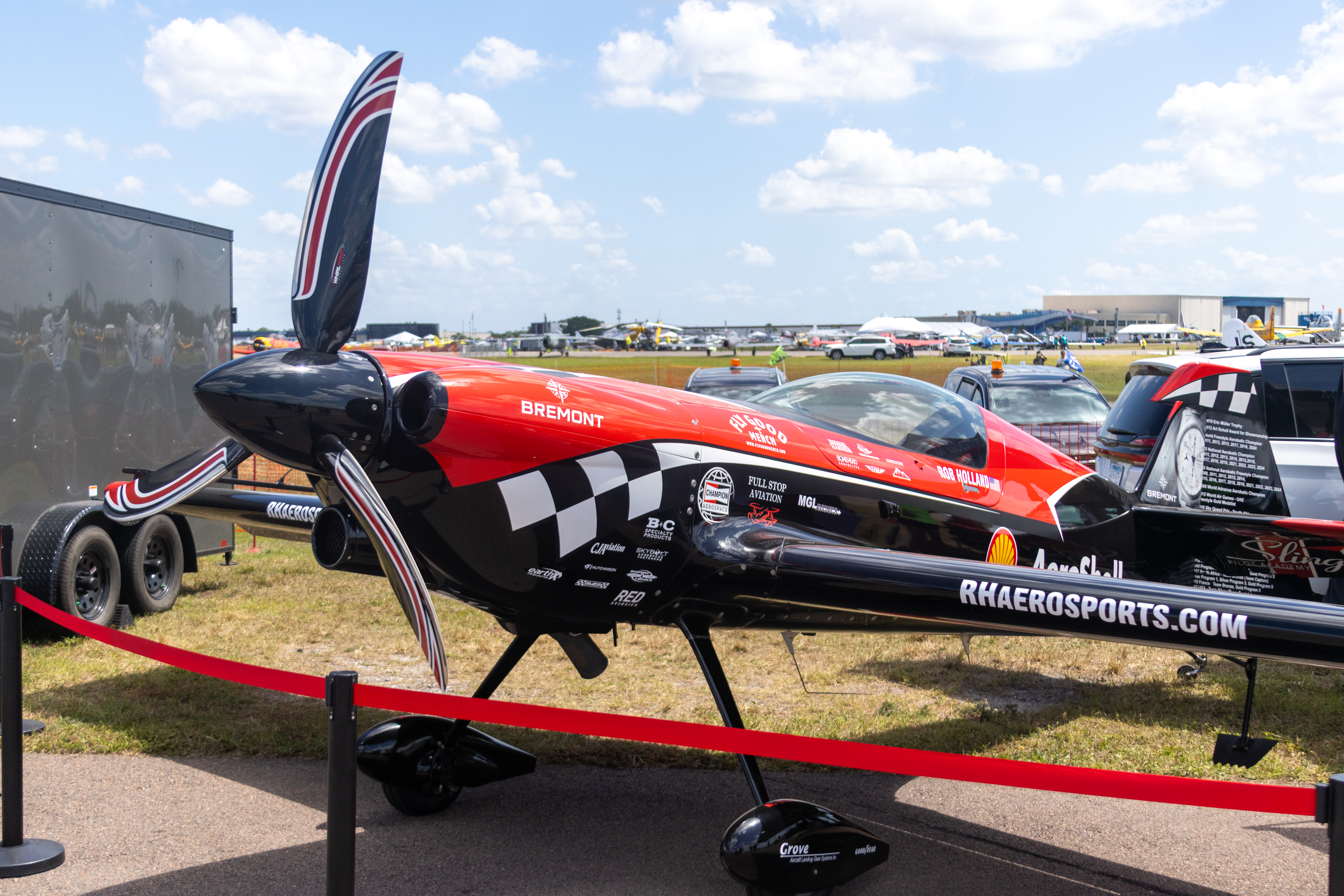
Rob Holland's MXS-RH pictured three weeks before the fatal accident.

On April 24, 2025, Holland died in an accident when his MX Aircraft MXS crashed on approach into Langley Air Force Base in advance of the Hampton Roads Airshow. An investigation into the crash was initiated by the National Transportation Safety Board (NTSB).

In the NTSB preliminary report it is thought that a counter-sunk screw used to access a compartment for weight to be added to the elevator came loose. This screw jammed the elevator and made him unable to control it, this subsequently led to the fatal crash. Eyewitnesses reported that Holland was around 50 feet (15 m) above the ground when his aircraft began to repeatedly change in attitude rapidly and eventually pitched up sharply and stalled before crashing.

== See also ==
- FAI World Aerobatic Championships
- International Aerobatic Club
