= FAI World Aerobatic Championships =

Competition in sport aviation

The FAI World Aerobatic Championships (WAC) is a competition in sport aviation organized by CIVA (Commission Internationale de Voltige Arienne), the aerobatic commission of the Fédération Aéronautique Internationale, the world air sports federation.

The WAC was formed in 1960, replacing the freestyle Lockheed Trophy contests.

== Winners Aresti Cup ==
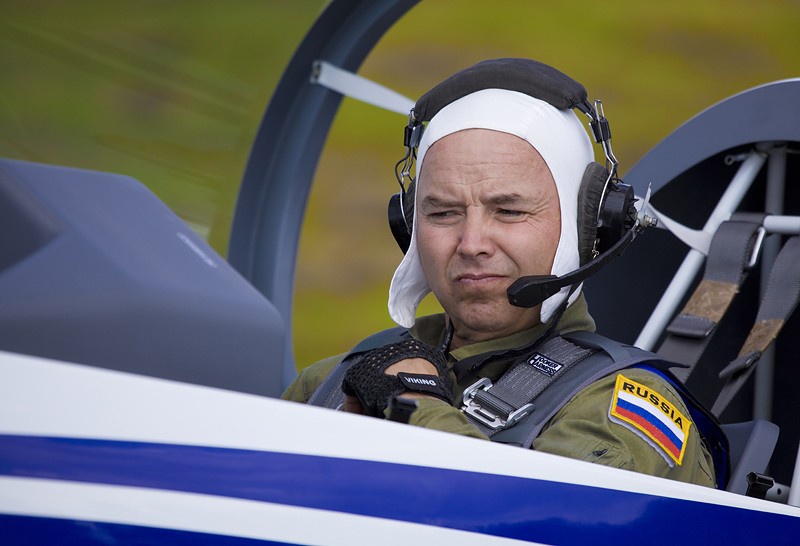
Three-time World Champion Mikhail Mamistov

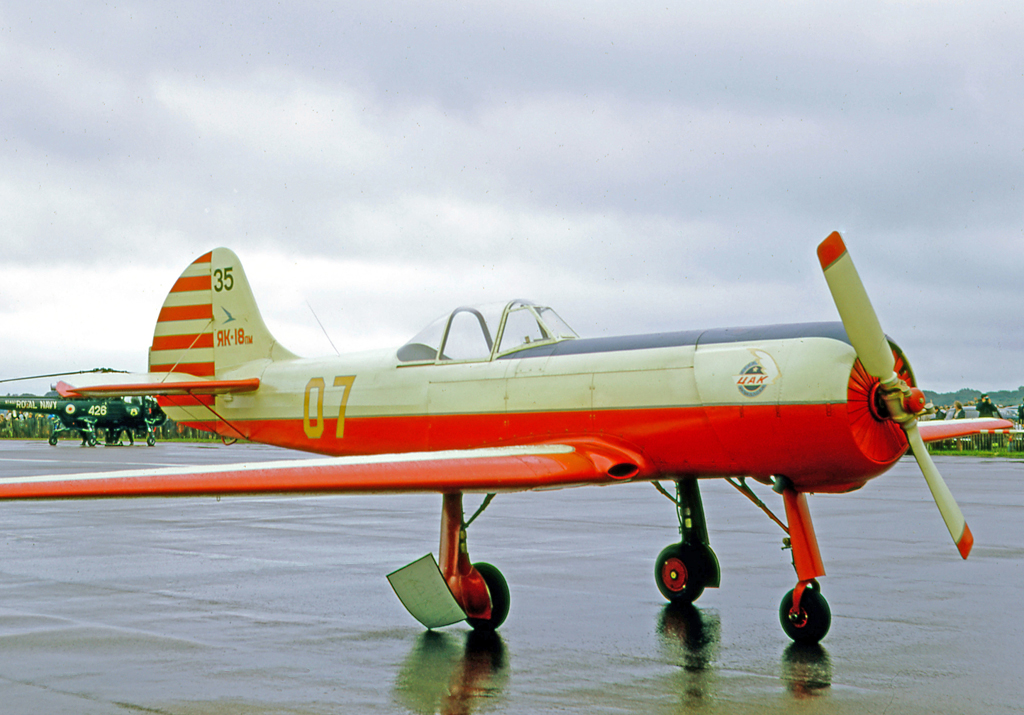
Yak-18PM at the 1970 WAC at Hullavington

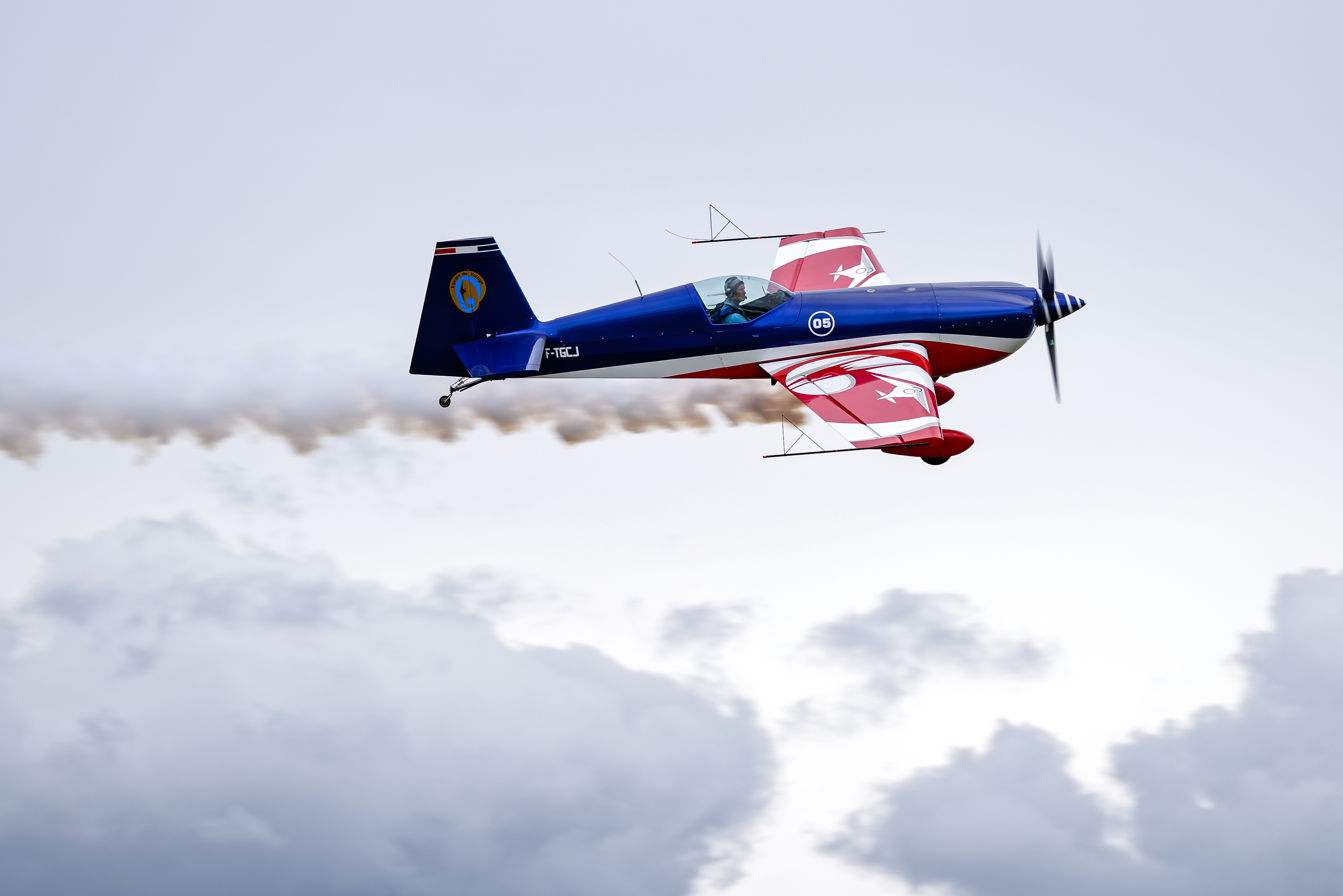
Extra 330SC flown by Renaud Ecalle and Francois Le Vot

No.	Year	Location	Country	World Champion	Airplane	Ref
33rd	2026	Mason City, United States	France	Florent Oddon	Extra 330SC	
32nd	2024	Mokre, Poland	France	Florent Oddon	Extra 330SC	
31st	2022	Leszno, Poland	France	Florent Oddon	Extra 330SC	
30th	2019	Châteauroux–Déols, France		Louis Vanel	Extra 330SC	
29th	2017	Malalane, South Africa	Russia	Mikhail Mamistov	Extra 330SC	
28th	2015	Châteauroux, France		Alexandre Orlowski	Extra 330SC	
27th	2013	North Texas, United States	France	François Le Vot	Extra 330SC	
26th	2011	Foligno, Italy	Russia	Mikhail Mamistov	Su-26M3	
25th	2009	Silverstone, United Kingdom	France	Renaud Ecalle	Extra 330SC	
24th	2007	Granada, Spain		Ramón Alonso	Su-31	
23rd	2005	Burgos, Spain	Russia	Sergey Rakhmanin	Su-26M3	
22nd	2003	Lakeland, Florida, United States	Russia	Sergey Rakhmanin	Su 31	
21st	2001	Burgos, Spain	Russia	Mikhail Mamistov	Su-31	
20th	2000	Muret, France		Eric Vazeille	CAP 232	
19th	1998	Trenčín, Slovakia	France	Patrick Paris	CAP 232	
18th	1996	Oklahoma City, United States	Russia	Victor Chmal	Su 26	
17th	1994	Debrecen, Hungary	France	Xavier de Lapparent	CAP 231EX	
16th	1992	Le Havre, France	—	Competition not held	—	
15th	1990	Yverdon, Switzerland	France	Claude Bessiere	CAP 231	
14th	1988	Red Deer, Canada	United States	Henry Haigh	Super Star	
13th	1986	South Cerney, United Kingdom	Czechoslovakia	Petr Jirmus	Z-50 LS	
12th	1984	Békéscsaba, Hungary	Czechoslovakia	Petr Jirmus	Z-50 LS	
11th	1982	Spitzerberg, Austria	USSR	Victor Smolin	Yak 50	
10th	1980	Oshkosh, United States		Leo Loudenslager	Laser Z-200	
9th	1978	České Budějovice, Czechoslovakia		Ivan Tuček	Z-50 L	
8th	1976	Kyiv, USSR		Victor Letsko	Yak 50	
—	1974	No competition	—	—	—	
7th	1972	Salon de Provence, France	United States	Charlie Hillard	Pitts S-1S 200	
6th	1970	Hullavington, United Kingdom	USSR	Igor Egorov	Yak-18PM	
5th	1968	Magdeburg, East Germany		Erwin Bläske	Z526A	
4th	1966	Moscow, USSR		Vladimir Martemianov	Yak-18PM	
3rd	1964	Bilbao, Spain		Tomás Castaño	Zlin Z326 TM	
2nd	1962	Budapest, Hungary		Josef Tóth	Z-326	
1st	1960	Bratislava, Czechoslovakia		Ladislav Bezák	Zlin 226T	

== Winners by teams ==
FAI WAC	Year	Location	Team winner	Country
33rd	2026	Mason City, Iowa, United States	TBD	
32nd	2024	Mokre, Poland	Florent Oddon, Louis Vanel, Victor Lalloue	France
31st	2022	Leszno, Poland	Florent Oddon, Alexandre Orlowski, Louis Vanel	France
30th	2019	Châteauroux–Déols, France	Louis Vanel, Alexandre Orlowski, Florent Oddon	France
29th	2017	Malalane, South Africa	Alexandre Orlowski, François Rallet, Olivier Masurel	France
28th	2015	Châteauroux, France	Alexandre Orlowski, François Rallet, Aude Lemordant	France
27th	2013	North Texas, USA	Francois Le Vot, Olivier Masurel, Francois Rallet	France
26th	2011	Foligno, Italy	Mikhail Mamistov, Oleg Shpolyanskiy, Svetlana Kapanina	Russia
25th	2009	Silverstone, United Kingdom	Renaud Ecalle, François Le Vot, Pierre Varloteaux	France
24th	2007	Burgos, Spain	Renaud Ecalle, Olivier Masurel, Matthieu Roulet	France
23rd	2005	Burgos, Spain	Sergey Rakhmanin, Oleg Shpolyanskiy, Svetlana Kapanina	Russia
22nd	2003	Lakeland, Florida, United States	Sergey Rakhmanin, Svetlana Kapanina, Alexandre Krotov	Russia
21st	2001	Burgos, Spain	Mikhail Mamistov, Oleg Shpolyanskiy, Svetlana Kapanina	Russia
20th	2000	Muret, France	Eric Vazeille, Eddy Dussau, Catherine Maunoury	France
19th	1998	Trenčín, Slovakia	Nicolai Timofeev, Svetlana Kapanina, Victor Tchmal	Russia
18th	1996	Oklahoma City, United States	Victor Tchmal, Nicolai Timofeev, Svetlana Kapanina	Russia
17th	1994	Debrecen, Hungary	Xavier De Lapparent, Patrick Paris, Dominique Roland	France
16th	1992	Le Havre, France	Competition not completed because of the time	—
15th	1990	Yverdon, Switzerland	Claude Bessiere, Patrick Paris, Jean-Paul Mondiere	France
14th	1988	Red Deer, Canada	Henry Haigh, Kermit Weeks, Clint McHenry	United States
13th	1986	South Cerney, United Kingdom	Victor Smolin, Nikolai Nikitiuk, Sergei Boriak	USSR
12th	1984	Békéscsaba, Hungary	Kermit Weeks, Henry Haigh, Alan Bush	United States
11th	1982	Spitzerberg, Austria	Viktor Smolin, Nikolai Nikitiuk, Jurgis Kairys	USSR
10th	1980	Oshkosh, United States	Leo Loudenslager, Henry Haigh, Kermit Weeks	United States
9th	1978	České Budějovice, Czechoslovakia	Ivan Tuček, Jiří Pospíšil, Daniel Polonec	Czechoslovakia
8th	1976	Kyiv, USSR	Leo Loudenslager, Henry Haigh, Kermit Weeks	United States
7th	1972	Salon de Provence, France	Charlie Hillard, Gene Soucy, Tom Poberezny	United States
6th	1970	Hullavington, United Kingdom	Svetlana Savitskaya, Zinaida Lizunova, Lidia Leonova	USSR
5th	1968	Magdeburg, East Germany	Erwin Bläske, Monika Schösser (Fleck), Peter Kahle	East Germany
4th	1966	Moscow, USSR	Vladimir Piskunov, Vadim Ovsyankin, Vitold Pochernin	USSR
3rd	1964	Bilbao, Spain	Ladislav Bezák, Ladislav Trebatický, Frantisek Skácelík	Czechoslovakia
2nd	1962	Budapest, Hungary	József Tóth, Sándor Katona, Péter Fejes	Hungary
1st	1960	Bratislava, Czechoslovakia	Ladislav Bezák, Jiří Bláha, František Skácelík	Czechoslovakia

== See also ==
- FAI European Aerobatic Championships
- Aerobatic maneuver
- Competition aerobatics
- Aerobatic aircraft
