= FAI European Aerobatic Championships =

The FAI European Aerobatic Championship is an aerobatic competition held biennially, alternating with the World Aerobatic Championship.

== Manfred Strößenreuther cup winners ==
=== Individual winners ===
FAI EAC	Year	Location	Unlimited winner	Aerobatic aircraft	Freestyle winner	Aerobatic aircraft
1st	1977	Esbjerg, Denmark	(Germany) Manfred Strößenreuther	Pitts S1-S	-	-
2nd	1979	Châteauroux, France	(Soviet Union) Viktor Letsko	Yak 50	-	-
3rd	1981	Tobaj, Austria	(Soviet Union) Valentina Yaikova (Goldobina)	Yak 50	-	-
4th	1983	Ravenna, Italy	(Czechoslovakia) Petr Jirmus, Valentina Yaikova (Goldobina)	Zlin Z-50LS	-	-
5th	1985	České Budějovice, Czechoslovakia	(Czechoslovakia) Petr Jirmus	Zlin Z-50LS	-	-
6th	1987	Speichersdorf, West Germany	(Soviet Union) Nikolai Nikitiuk	Su 26M	(Soviet Union) Victor Smolin	Su 26M
7th	1989	Békéscsaba, Hungary	(Soviet Union) Jurgis Kairys	Su 26M	-	-
8th	1991	Muret, France	(Soviet Union) Nikolai Nikitiuk	Su 26M	-	-
9th	1993	Grosseto, Italy	(France) Patrick Paris	CAP 231EX	-	-
10th	1995	Hradec Králové, Czech Republic	(France) Patrick Paris	CAP 232	(Hungary) Péter Besenyei	Extra 300S
11th	1997	Antalya, Turkey	(France) Patrick Paris	CAP 232	-	-
12th	1999	Córdoba, Spain	(Russia) Sergey Rakhmanin		-	-
13th	2002	Panevėžys, Lithuania	(Spain) Ramón Alonso		(Germany) Klaus Schrodt	
14th	2004	Kaunas, Lithuania	(Russia) Mikhail Mamistov		(Germany) Klaus Schrodt	Extra 330 XS
15th	2006	Grenchen, Switzerland	(Russia) Mikhail Mamistov	Su 26 M3	(Austria) Hannes Arch	Edge 540
16th	2008	Hradec Králové, Czech Republic	(Russia) Mikhail Mamistov	Su 26M	(France) Renaud Écalle	Extra EA 330SC
17th	2010	Toužim, Czech Republic	(France) Renaud Écalle	Extra 330SC	-	-
18th	2012	Dubnica nad Váhom, Slovakia	(Russia) Mikhail Mamistov	Su 26M3	(United Kingdom) Gerald Cooper	XA41
19th	2014	Kecskemét, Hungary	(Spain) Cástor Fantoba	Su-26M	(Czech Republic) Martin Šonka	Extra 330SC
20th	2016	Moravská Třebová, Czech Republic	(Russia) Mikhail Mamistov	Extra 330SC	(Czech Republic) Martin Šonka	Extra EA-300SR
21st	2018	Jindřichův Hradec, Czech Republic	(France) Alexandre Orlowski	Extra 300SC	(Czech Republic) Martin Šonka	Extra 300SR
22nd	2023	Pavullo nel Frignano, Italy	(France) Florent Oddon	Extra 300SC	(France) Florent Oddon	Extra 300SC

=== Winners by teams ===
FAI EAC	Year	Location	Winner team	Country
1st	1977	Esbjerg, Denmark	-	-
2nd	1979	Châteauroux, France	-	-
3rd	1981	Tobaj, Austria	Valentina Yaikova (Goldobina), Victor Smolin, Liubov Nemkova (Morokhova)	Soviet Union
4th	1983	Ravenna, Italy	Valentina Yaikova (Goldobina), Khalide Makagonova (Ajnetdinova), Victor Smolin	Soviet Union
5th	1985	České Budějovice, Czechoslovakia	Victor Smolin, Nikolai Nikitiuk, Valentina Yaikova (Goldobina)	Soviet Union
6th	1987	Speichersdorf, West Germany	Nikolai Nikitiuk, Victor Smolin, Jurgis Kairys	Soviet Union
7th	1989	Békéscsaba, Hungary	Jurgis Kairys, Nikolai Nikitiuk, Liubov Nemkova (Morokhova)	Soviet Union
8th	1991	Muret, France	Nikolai Nikitiuk, Alexander Lyubarets, Sergei Boriak	Soviet Union
9th	1993	Grosseto, Italy		
10th	1995	Hradec Králové, Czech Republic	Patrick Paris, Dominique Roland, Pascale Alajouanine	France
11th	1997	Antalya, Turkey	Patrick Paris, Eddy Dussau, Eric Vazeille	France
12th	1999	Córdoba, Spain	Sergey Rakhmanin, Oleg Shpolyansky, Mikhail Mamistov	Russia
13th	2002	Panevėžys, Lithuania	Sergey Rakhmanin, Victor Tchmal, Oleg Shpolyansky	Russia
14th	2004	Kaunas, Lithuania	Mikhail Mamistov, Sergey Rakhmanin, Oleg Shpolyansky	Russia
15th	2006	Grenchen, Switzerland	Mikhail Mamistov, Oleg Shpolyansky, Victor Tchmal	Russia
16th	2008	Hradec Králové, Czech Republic	Mikhail Mamistov, Oleg Shpolyansky, Svetlana Kapanina	Russia
17th	2010	Toužim, Czech Republic	Mikhail Mamistov, Alexandre Krotov, Elena Klimovich	Russia
18th	2012	Dubnica nad Váhom, Slovakia	François Le Vot, Olivier Masurel, Nicolas Ivanoff	France
19th	2014	Kecskemét, Hungary	François Le Vot, Mikaël Brageot, Alexandre Orlowski	France
20th	2016	Moravská Třebová, Czech Republic	Masurel Olivier, Mikaël Brageot, Alexandre Orlowski	France
21st	2018	Jindřichův Hradec, Czech Republic	Alexandre Orlowski, Louis Vanel, Mikaël Brageot	France
22nd	2023	Pavullo nel Frignano, Italy	Florent Oddon, Louis Vanel	France

== See also ==
- FAI World Aerobatic Championships
- Aerobatic maneuver
- Competition aerobatics
