= 2010 Red Bull Air Race World Championship =

Seasons
- ← 2009 2014 →

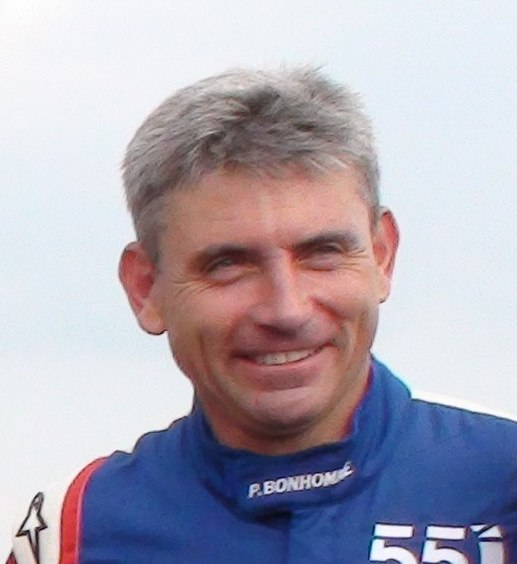
Paul Bonhomme claimed his second consecutive Air Race World Championship, defeating Hannes Arch by four points.

The 2010 Red Bull Air Race World Championship was the eighth official Red Bull Air Race World Championship series. Paul Bonhomme became champion for the second successive year, finishing each of the six rounds of the championship in the top three placings, two of which were victories. Hannes Arch was the only other round winner, taking four victories but finished four points behind Bonhomme, after an eleventh-place finish in the season-opener in the United Arab Emirates. Nigel Lamb finished third with three runner-up placings, and three fourth places.

At the end of the season, Red Bull Air Race GmbH announced that the series would take a one-year break in 2011, to reorganize and strengthen development and commercial aspects of the series.

== Aircraft and pilots ==
No.	Pilot	Aircraft	Rounds Contested
4	(United States) Kirby Chambliss	Edge 540	All
5	(Hungary) Péter Besenyei	MX Aircraft MXS-R	All
7	(Brazil) Adilson Kindlemann	MX Aircraft MXS-R	1
8	(Czech Republic) Martin Šonka	Edge 540	All
9	(United Kingdom) Nigel Lamb	MX Aircraft MXS-R	All
18	(Russia) Sergey Rakhmanin	MX Aircraft MXS-R	All
21	(Germany) Matthias Dolderer	Edge 540	All
27	(France) Nicolas Ivanoff	Edge 540	All
28	(Austria) Hannes Arch	Edge 540	All
31	(Japan) Yoshihide Muroya	Edge 540	1–4, 6
36	(Spain) Alejandro Maclean	MX Aircraft MXS-R	All
55	(United Kingdom) Paul Bonhomme	Edge 540	All
84	(Canada) Pete McLeod	Edge 540	All
95	(Australia) Matt Hall	MX Aircraft MXS-R	1–4, 6
99	(United States) Michael Goulian	Edge 540	All

=== New pilots ===
Two new pilots joined the Red Bull Air Race Series for 2010 season as Mike Mangold and Glen Dell left the series. They were Martin Šonka from the Czech Republic and Adilson Kindlemann from Brazil.

== Race calendar and results ==
Round	Location	Country	Date	Fastest Qualifying	Winning Pilot	Winning Aircraft
1	Mina' Zayid, Abu Dhabi	United Arab Emirates	March 26–27	Hannes Arch	Paul Bonhomme	Edge 540
2	Swan River, Perth	Australia	April 17–18	Paul Bonhomme	Hannes Arch	Edge 540
3	Flamengo Beach, Rio de Janeiro	Brazil	May 8–9	Hannes Arch	Hannes Arch	Edge 540
4	Windsor, Ontario	Canada	June 5–6	Nigel Lamb	Hannes Arch	Edge 540
5	New York City	United States	June 19–20	Hannes Arch	Paul Bonhomme	Edge 540
6	EuroSpeedway Lausitz	Germany	August 7–8	Paul Bonhomme	Hannes Arch	Edge 540
7	River Danube, Budapest	Hungary	Cancelled			
8	Lisbon	Portugal	Cancelled			

== Championship standings ==
Rank	Pilot	Race Results (Place)						Points
Rank	Pilot	(United Arab Emirates) UAE	(Australia) AUS	(Brazil) BRA	(Canada) CAN	(United States) USA	(Germany) GER	Points
1	Paul Bonhomme	1	3*	3	2	1	2*	64
2	Hannes Arch	11*	1	1*	1	4*	1	60
3	Nigel Lamb	2	4	2	4*	2	4	55
4	Kirby Chambliss	6	8	5	3	3	6	41
5	Pete McLeod	5	5	7	9	5	8	33
6	Nicolas Ivanoff	9	6	6	7	6	5	33
7	Matt Hall	8	2	4	DSQ	EX	3	31
8	Matthias Dolderer	7	7	10	5	10	7	26
9	Michael Goulian	4	11	8	6	7	13	24
10	Péter Besenyei	3	10	11	10	8	9	21
11	Alejandro Maclean	12	13	9	11	9	10	9
12	Yoshihide Muroya	10	9	12	DNS		12	5
13	Sergey Rakhmanin	15	12	14	8	12	14	4
14	Martin Šonka	13	14	13	12	11	11	2
15	Adilson Kindlemann	14						0

Colour	Result
Gold	Winner
Silver	Second place
Bronze	Third place
Green	Points classification
Blue	Non-points classification
Blue	Non-classified finish (NC)
Purple	Retired, not classified (Ret)
Red	Did not qualify (DNQ)
Red	Did not pre-qualify (DNPQ)
Black	Disqualified (DSQ)
White	Did not start (DNS)
White	Withdrew (WD)
White	Race cancelled (C)
Blank	Did not practice (DNP)
Blank	Did not arrive (DNA)
Blank	Excluded (EX)

(*) indicates the pilot received an extra point for the fastest time in Qualifying

Position	1st	2nd	3rd	4th	5th	6th	7th	8th	9th	10th	11th	12th	13th	14th	15th	Qualifying Fastest
Points	12	10	9	8	7	6	5	4	3	2	1	0	0	0	0	1

== Incidents ==
At about 11:50AM local time, (3:50 UTC) on 15 April, Brazilian pilot Adilson Kindlemann crashed his MXS-R aircraft into the Swan River in Perth, Western Australia during practice. Rescuers were on the scene within one minute. Kindlemann was taken to Royal Perth Hospital where it was found that he had no serious injuries. It was only the previous day (14 April) that the pilots completed their underwater emergency training. Kindlemann was the first South American to contest the Air Race and was three-times Brazilian aerobatics champion (Unlimited category) when he joined the competition with 18 years aerobatics experience; over 11,000 hours flight time; and about 1,200 hours of aerobatics, as detailed on the official Red Bull Air Race website.

During qualifying for the race in Windsor, Matt Hall nearly crashed his aircraft into the Detroit River. The aircraft lost lift after a series of high-G turns and dipped both wings and a wheel into the water before Hall powered up and out of what could have been a bad wreck. His aircraft was too damaged to continue and he was disqualified from competing both that weekend and the following race in New York.

Spanish pilot Alejandro Maclean was killed on 17 August, when his aircraft crashed into the ground while performing a manoeuvre during a training exercise at Casarrubios del Monte in Spain.
