= 2008 Red Bull Air Race World Series =

Seasons
- ← 2007 2009 →

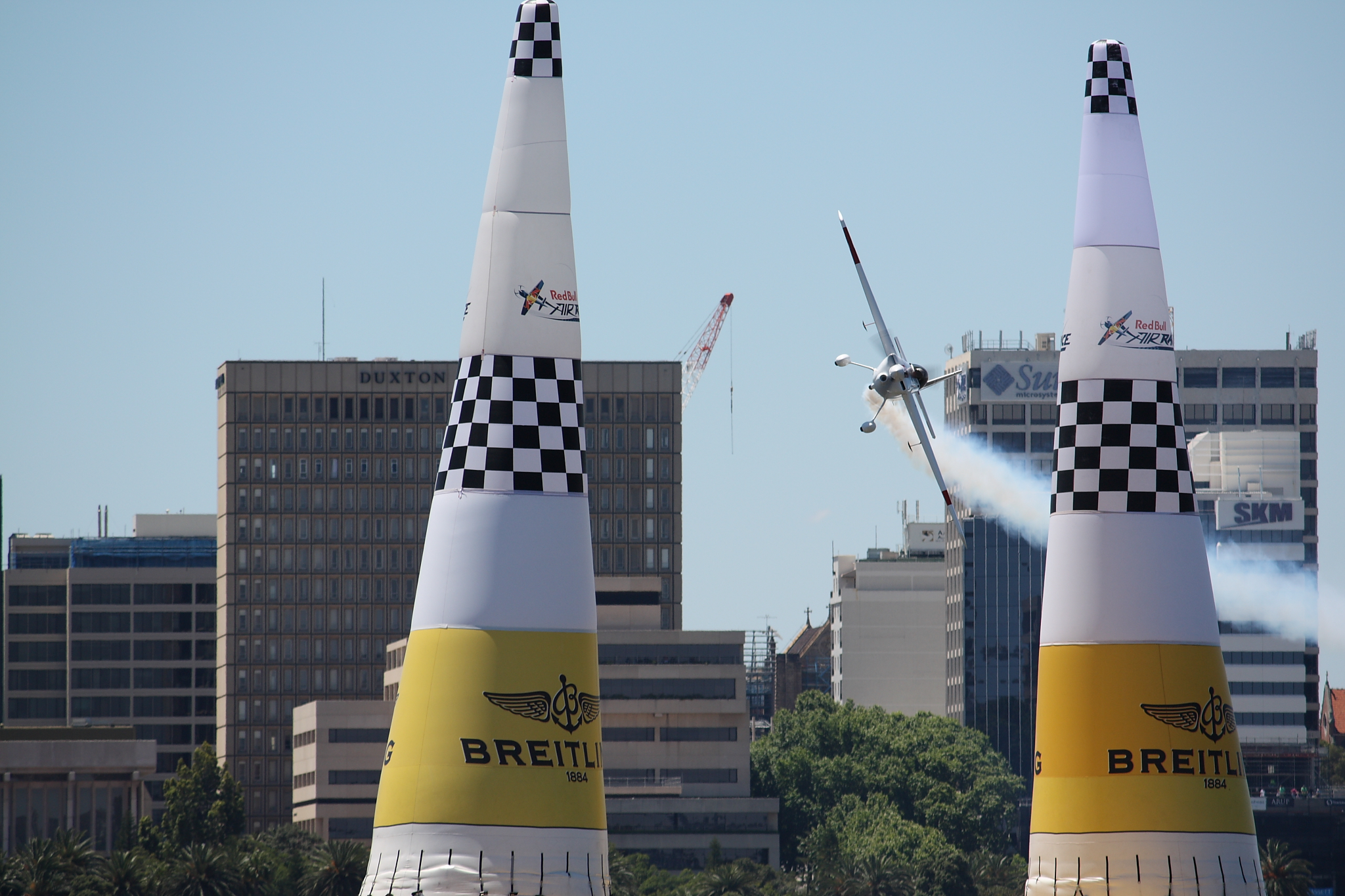
Paul Bonhomme approaches the start/finish pylons in the Perth race en route to the win.

The 2008 Red Bull Air Race World Series season was the sixth Red Bull Air Race World Series season. The 2008 champion was Hannes Arch, who won the series for the first time.

== Aircraft and pilots ==
Pilot	Aircraft	No.
(Austria) Hannes Arch	Zivko Edge 540	28
(Hungary) Péter Besenyei	Zivko Edge 540	3
(United Kingdom) Paul Bonhomme	Zivko Edge 540	2
(United States) Kirby Chambliss	Zivko Edge 540	4
(South Africa) Glen Dell	Zivko Edge 540	45
(United States) Michael Goulian	Zivko Edge 540	99
(United Kingdom) Steve Jones	Zivko Edge 540	19
(United States) Mike Mangold	Zivko Edge 540	1
(Russia) Sergey Rakhmanin	Zivko Edge 540	18
(United Kingdom) Nigel Lamb	MX2	9
(Spain) Alejandro Maclean	MX2	36
(France) Nicolas Ivanoff	Extra 300SR	27

=== New pilots ===
South African Glen Dell was the only new pilot to join the Red Bull Air Race Series for the 2008 season as Klaus Schrodt and Frank Versteegh left the series.

== Race calendar and results ==
Round	Location	Country	Date	Winning Pilot	Winning Aircraft
1	(United Arab Emirates) Mina' Zayid, Abu Dhabi	United Arab Emirates	April 10–11	(United Kingdom) Paul Bonhomme	Zivko Edge 540
2	(United States) San Diego, California	United States	May 3–4	(United Kingdom) Paul Bonhomme	Zivko Edge 540
3	(United States) Detroit, Michigan *	United States	May 31–June 1	(United States) Kirby Chambliss	Zivko Edge 540
	(Sweden) Stockholm *	Sweden	July 5–6	cancelled	
4	(Netherlands) Erasmusbrug, Rotterdam	Netherlands	July 19–20	(United Kingdom) Paul Bonhomme	Zivko Edge 540
5	(United Kingdom) River Thames, London	United Kingdom	August 2–3	(United States) Kirby Chambliss	Zivko Edge 540
6	(Hungary) River Danube, Budapest	Hungary	August 19–20	(Austria) Hannes Arch	Zivko Edge 540
7	(Portugal) River Douro, Porto	Portugal	September 6–7	(Austria) Hannes Arch	Zivko Edge 540
	(Spain) Barcelona *	Spain	September 27–28	cancelled	
8	(Australia) Swan River, Perth	Australia	November 1–2	(United Kingdom) Steve Jones	Zivko Edge 540

* Due to strong winds, the first day of racing in Detroit was cancelled.

* Due to course complications, the race in Stockholm was cancelled.

* Due to security reasons, the race in Spain was cancelled.

== Championship standings ==
Rank	Pilot	UAE (United Arab Emirates)	U.S. (United States)	U.S. (United States)	NED (Netherlands)	GBR (United Kingdom)	HUN (Hungary)	POR (Portugal)	AUS (Australia)	Total points
1	(Austria) Hannes Arch	2	4	3	2	3	1	1	3	61
2	(United Kingdom) Paul Bonhomme	1	1	2	1	7	3	10	1	54
3	(United States) Kirby Chambliss	5	3	1	4	1	12	2	8	46
4	(United States) Mike Mangold	3	2	4	5	6	4	3	9	44
5	(Hungary) Péter Besenyei	4	8	5	6	4	5	7	7	34
6	(United Kingdom) Steve Jones	7	9	7	3	9	2	4	6	33
7	(United Kingdom) Nigel Lamb	8	6	12	8	5	6	5	2	30
8	(Spain) Alejandro Maclean	6	7	9	10	8	7	8	4	21
9	(France) Nicolas Ivanoff	9	10	6	11	2	10	9	5	19
10	(United States) Michael Goulian	11	5	8	7	11	8	6	10	16
11	(South Africa) Glen Dell	12	12	11	12	10	11	12	12	0
12	(Russia) Sergey Rakhmanin	10	11	10	9	12	9	11	11	2
Rank	Pilot	UAE (United Arab Emirates)	U.S. (United States)	U.S. (United States)	NED (Netherlands)	GBR (United Kingdom)	HUN (Hungary)	POR (Portugal)	AUS (Australia)	Total points

Position	1st	2nd	3rd	4th	5th	6th	7th	8th	9th	10th	11th	12th
Points	9	8	7	6	5	4	3	2	1	0	0	0
