= Jurgis Kairys =

Lithuanian air racer

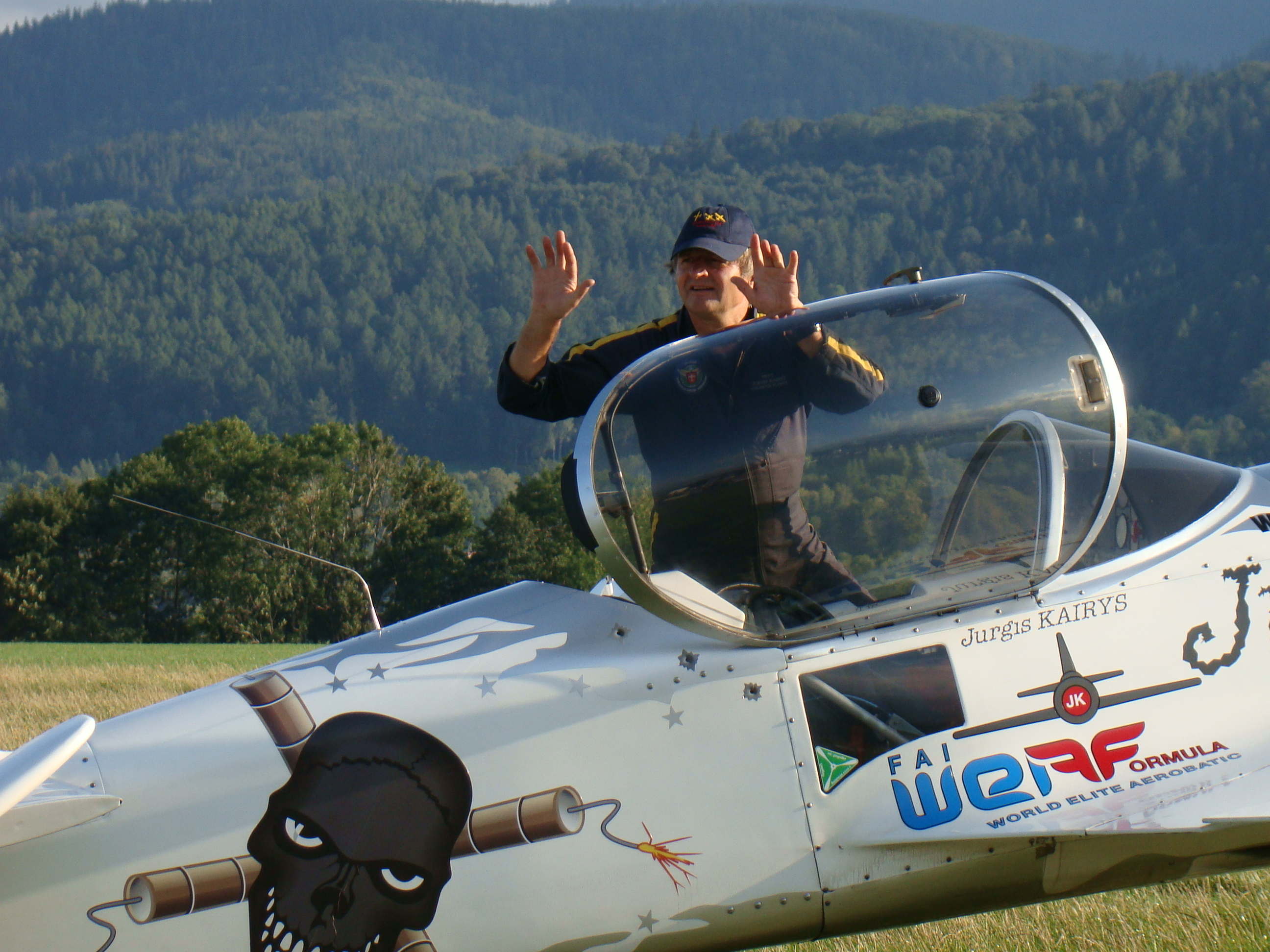
- Kairys in his Su-31

Personal information
- Nationality: Lithuanian
- Born: 6 May 1952 (age 74) Krasnoyarsk, Russian SFSR, Soviet Union

Sport
- Country: Lithuania
- Sport: AirSport
- Event: Aerobatic
Medal record
World Championships
Gold medal – first place	1990 Yverdon	Freestyle
Gold medal – first place	1994 Debrecen	Freestyle
Silver medal – second place	1988 Red Deer	Freestyle
Silver medal – second place	1996 Oklahoma City	Freestyle
Silver medal – second place	2009 Silverstone	Freestyle
Bronze medal – third place	1988 Red Deer	Unlimited
Bronze medal – third place	2011 Foligno	Freestyle
European Championships
Gold medal – first place	1989 Bekescsaba	Freestyle
Bronze medal – third place	1987 Plössen	Freestyle
Bronze medal – third place	1993 Grosseto	Unlimited

Jurgis Kairys (born 6 May 1952 in Krasnoyarsk Krai) is a Lithuanian aerobatic pilot and aeronautical engineer.

== Biography ==
Jurgis Kairys was born on 6 May 1952 in Sharipovo, Krasnoyarsk Krai, Russian SFSR, Soviet Union (now Russia), where his family had been deported during the Soviet occupation of Lithuania. After returning to Lithuania, he graduated from Kaltinėnai Secondary School in 1970. He studied at the Vyborg Aviation Technical School from 1970 to 1973, attended the Vilnius Civil Engineering Institute in 1978–1979, and graduated from the Leningrad Civil Aviation Academy in 1984.

From 1973 to 1977, Kairys worked as an engineer-mechanic at the Kaunas Airport aviation workshops. He subsequently joined the Vilnius Aeroclub, where he worked as an engineer and flight instructor until 1989. Between 1989 and 1996, he served as a test pilot at the Sukhoi aircraft manufacturing plant, participating in the development and testing of the Su-26, Su-29 and Su-31 aerobatic aircraft and contributing to several technical innovations. In 1994, he founded the aviation company Kairio skrydžiai ("Kairys Flights"). He has also served as president of the Darius and Girėnas Aeroclub of Vilnius.

== See also ==
- Competition aerobatics
