= Catherine Maunoury =

French aerobatic pilot

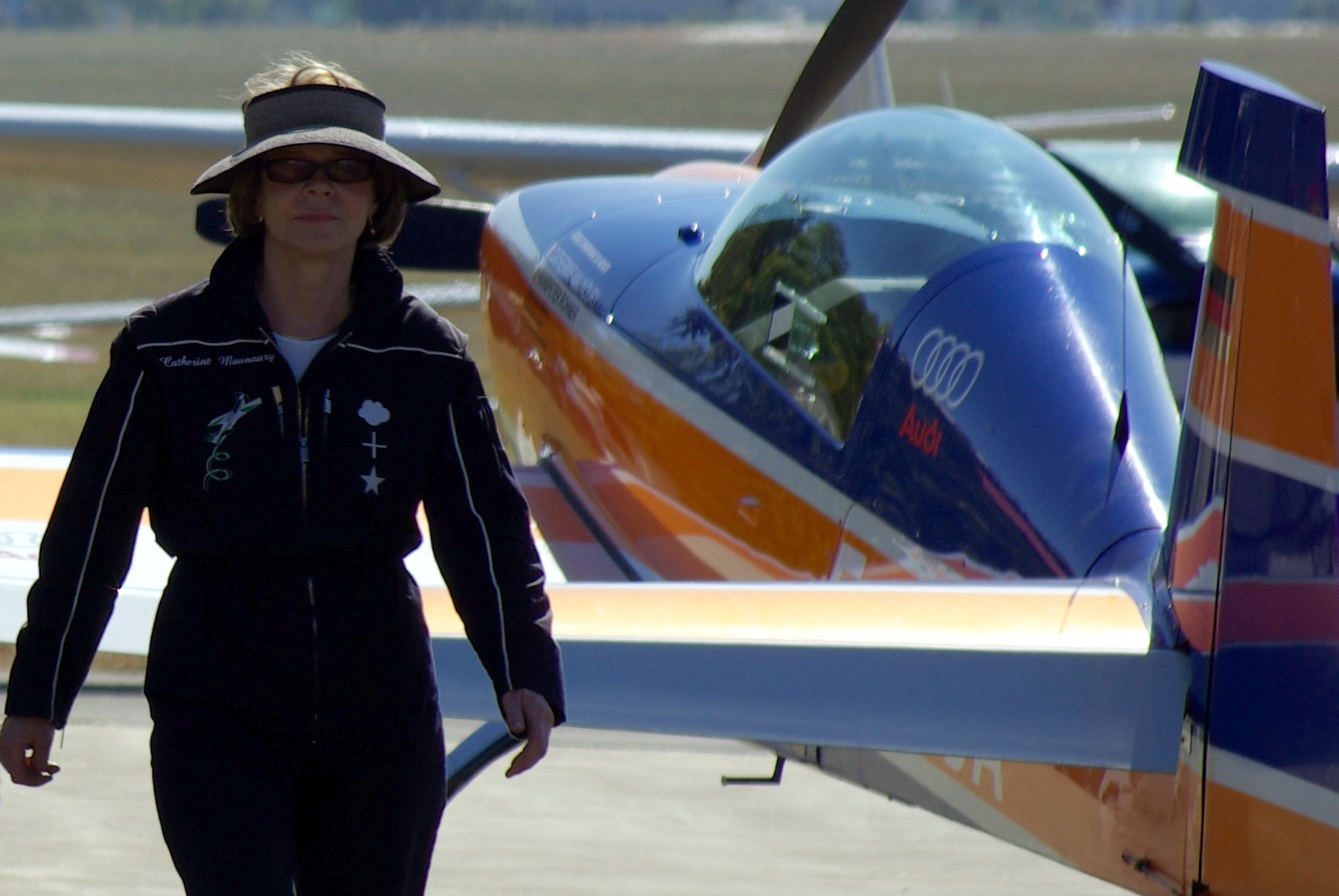
Catherine Maunoury and her Extra 300LP after a demonstration at the Gimont airshow

Catherine Maunoury is a French aerobatic pilot.

She won the World Aerobatic Championships in 1988 and 2000 in the female category. Only Svetlana Kapanina won this title more often.

In 2005 she was awarded the Centenary Medal by the Fédération Aéronautique Internationale.

== Honors and awards ==
- Commander of the Order of Legion of Honour
- Commander of the Ordre National du Mérite
- Knight of the Ordre des Arts et des Lettres
