= Svetlana Kapanina =

Russian aerobatics pilot

- Светлана Капанина
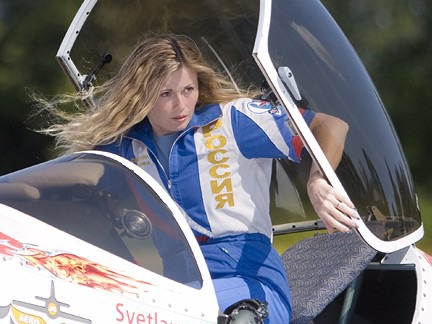
- Kapanina in 2011 at the Otopeni Airshow
- Born: Svetlana Vladimirovna Kapanina; 28 December 1968 (age 57); Shchuchinsk, Kokchetav Oblast, Kazakh SSR, Soviet Union
- Citizenship: Soviet Union; Russia
- Education: Pharmaceutical Sciences; Tselinograd Medical School, 1987
Awards
Several others (see below)
- Website: http://www.kapanina.com/

Svetlana Vladimirovna Kapanina (Russian: Светлана Владимировна Капанина; born 28 December 1968) is a Kazakh-born Russian aerobatic pilot.

== Biography ==
Kapanina was born on 28 December 1968 in Shchuchinsk, Kokchetav Oblast, Kazakh Soviet Socialist Republic, Union of Soviet Socialist Republics (now Akmola Region, Republic of Kazakhstan). She dedicated herself to several sports modalities at school and always liked motorcycles and other motor vehicles. She enrolled at medical school in Tselinograd (now Astana), where she graduated in pharmaceutical sciences. She started flying at age 19, in 1988, on a Sukhoi Su-26M3, while working as a technician at the Kurgan sports aviation club of DOSAAF. By 1991 she was already an instructor pilot at DOSAAF's Irkutsk club, and then back at Kurgan. Also in 1991, she became a member of the Russian national aerobatic team. In 1995 she graduated from Kaluga aeronautical technical school.

She lives in Moscow with her husband and two children.

== Achievements in aerobatics ==
Kapanina was World Aerobatic Champion in the women's category in 1996, 1998, 2001, 2003, 2005, 2007 and 2011 and has won the title more times than any other pilot in the category. Additionally, she was overall World Air Games Champion in 1997 and 2001.

Together with Mikhail Mamistov and Oleg Spolyansky, she won the team gold medal in the 16th FAI European Aerobatic Championships 2008 in Hradec Králové (Czech Republic). She placed fourth overall and was best female participant.

== Honours and awards ==
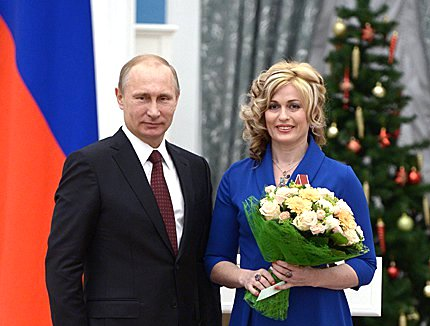
Putin awarding the Order of Courage

- Order of Courage (14 August 2014). President Vladimir Putin presented the order on 22 December 2014.
- Order of Honour (2002)
- Medal of the Order "For Merit to the Fatherland" 2nd class (1995)
- Honorary citizen of the Kurgan Oblast (2 February 2015)

In 1997, she received the Paul Tissandier Diploma by the Fédération Aéronautique Internationale (FAI). In 2005 she was awarded the Sabiha Gökçen Medal and the Centenary Medal by the FAI.

== See also ==
- Competition aerobatics
- FAI World Aerobatic Championships
- FAI European Aerobatic Championships
