= Olivier Masurel =

French aerobatic pilot (1981/1982–2024)

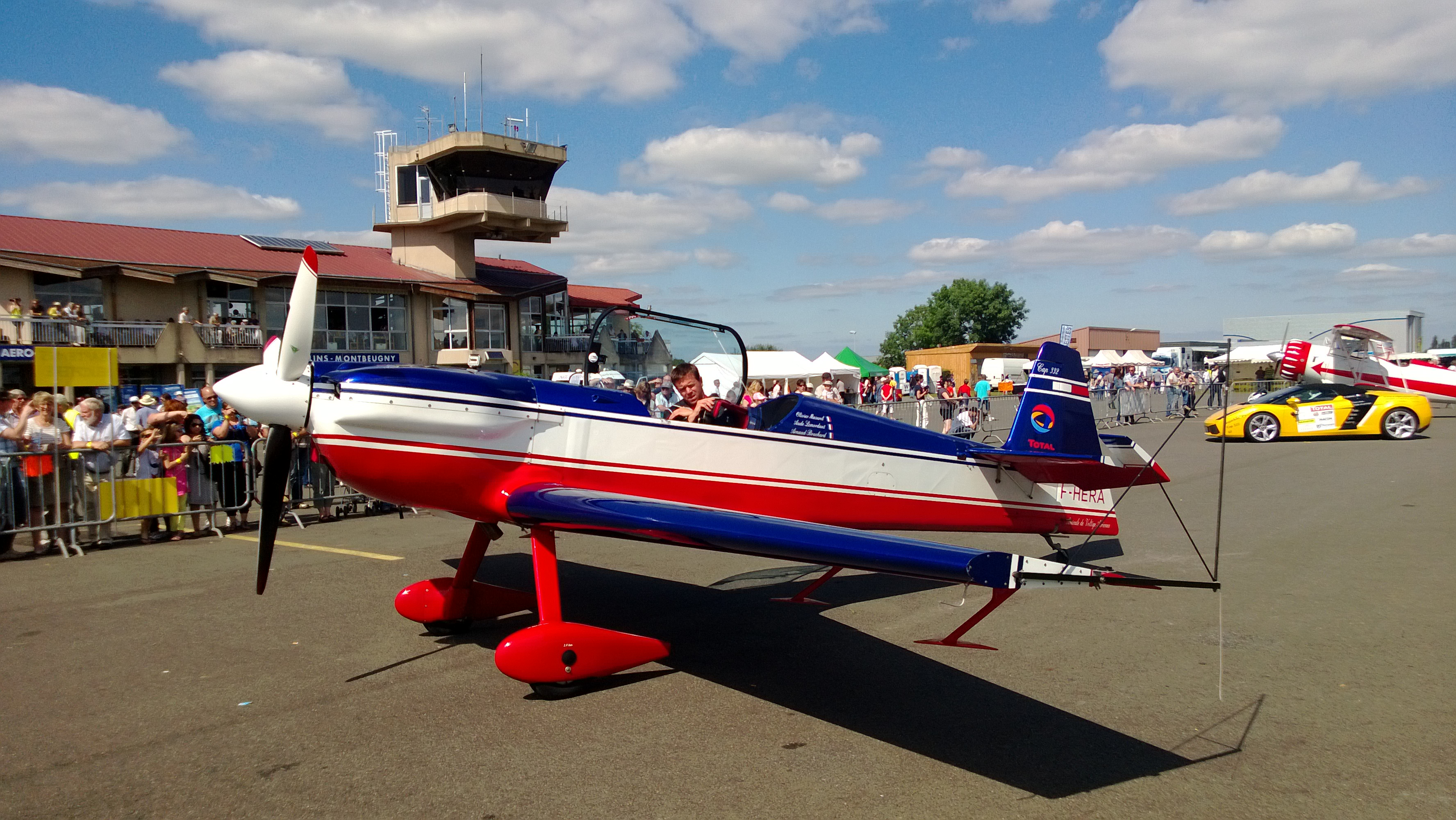
- Masurel in 2013
- Born: 1980; Bayonne
- Died: 5 May 2024 (aged 44); Alcázar de San Juan, Spain
- Occupation: Aerobatic pilot

Olivier Masurel (1980 – 5 May 2024) was a French aerobatic pilot. He was a French aerobatics champion and coach of the Advanced team in 2013.

== Biography ==
Masurel was an international aerobatics competitor, winning the FAI World Aerobatic Team Championships in 2007, 2013, and 2017. He was also FAI European Aerobatic Team Champion in 2012 and 2016. In 2011, he was Vice-World Champion in all categories. In 2012, he was overall champion of France. In 2013, he won the silver medal at the French championships in Moulins. He was the French single-seater champion in 2015 at Épernay.

Masurel died in an aviation accident in Alcázar de San Juan on 5 May 2024, when his aircraft collided with a vulture.
