= CAP21 =

CAP21 may refer to:

- Citizenship, Action, Participation for the 21st Century - a green liberal political party in France.
- Collaborative Arts Project 21 - an Off-Broadway theatre company and musical theatre training conservatory.
- A version of the Mudry CAP 20, a French single-seat aerobatic monoplane.
