= International Aerobatic Club =

Aviation organization dedicated to aerobatic flying

The International Aerobatic Club (IAC) is a division of the Experimental Aircraft Association (EAA) and the National Aeronautics Association (NAA). It promotes aerobatics and governs the sport of competition aerobatics in the United States under the regulations of the Fédération Aéronautique Internationale (FAI).

The IAC was founded in 1970 as an evolution of the EAA's "Precision Flying Division" to provide an organized method for advancing aerobatic skills via a "building block" competition system. It is responsible for pilot selection of Advanced and Unlimited Power, and Advanced Glider, aerobatic teams that represent the U.S. at World Aerobatic Championships events. IAC has grown to be the world's largest aerobatic organization.

IAC chapters throughout the U.S. promote aerobatics at a local level and host aerobatic critiques, seminars and competitions.

== See also ==
- IAC's official web site
- U.S. Advanced Aerobatic Team web site
- U.S. Unlimited Aerobatic Team web site
- British Aerobatic Association for information about the BAeA, IAC's counterpart in Britain.
- Aerobatics Canada's web site for information about Aerobatics Canada, IAC's counterpart in Canada.
