= Petr Jirmus =

Czech pilot

Personal information
- National team: Czechoslovakia
- Citizenship: Czech Republic
- Born: December 26, 1957 (age 67); České Budějovice

Sport
- Sport: Aerobatics

Achievements and titles
- World finals: 2x World Champion (1984, 1986)
- Regional finals: 2x European Champion (1983, 1985)

Petr Jirmus (born 26 December 1957) is a Czech pilot. He is notable for his achievements as an aerobatic pilot, winning the FAI World Aerobatic Championships in 1984 and 1986, being two-time winner of the FAI European Aerobatic Championships (in 1983 and 1985). In 1985, he was voted Sportsperson of the Year (Czechoslovakia). Since 2000, Jirmus was flying commercially for Travel Service Airlines.
