= Adilson Kindlemann =

Brazilian pilot (born 1973)

Adilson Kindelmann
- Born: May 4, 1973 (age 53)
- Website: adilsonkindlemann.com

Adilson Kindelmann (born May 4, 1973) is a Brazilian pilot, who competes in the Red Bull Air Race World Series. Working hard since 2007 to be able to compete, Kindlemann faced five training sessions and also participated at the World Aerobatic Championship in 2009. In October of the same year, he joined the Red Bull Air Race Qualification Camp at Cassarubios, in Madrid, Spain, gaining the Super License and allowing him to start competing in the 2010 Season. Kindlemann was the first South American to compete in the Red Bull Air Race World Championship – South America is now the 6th continent represented.

Currently an airline pilot with more than 11,000 flight hours, Adilson has about 700 hours of aerobatics. During his 19 years of experience in aerobatics, he has performed over 300 shows in Brazil, reaching an audience exceeding 1.8 million people.

Born in the countryside of São Paulo, Adilson made his first flight at age 15. For three consecutive years, he was the Brazilian champion at unlimited level competition, winning titles from 2001 to 2003. Another important achievement was the title of Honorary Member of the Brazilian Air Force.

Red Bull Air Race

Kindlemann Air Racing Team, of which Adilson is both pilot and owner, made the debut at Red Bull Air Race on March 27, 2010, in Abu Dhabi.

== 2010 Crash ==
During a training session at the second round of the 2010 Season (Perth, Australia) Kindelmann's aircraft crashed into the Swan River. It's understood that the aircraft stalled during a turn. He was able to level the wings before touching the water, but unfortunately after the initial contact, the aircraft flipped over. Adilson was uninjured and was rescued within minutes.

Kindelmann is the first pilot to crash during any part of the Red Bull Air Race.

Since the incident, the Brazilian pilot has been active in his quest to return to the sport. Initially, Kindlemann expected to return at the European leg of the competition for the last three races of 2010. However, along with the Committee of the Red Bull Air Race, had decided to return in 2011 until the series was suspended on safety grounds. He did not return when the series restarted in 2014.
