= 2009 Red Bull Air Race World Championship =

Seasons
- ← 2008 2010 →

The 2009 Red Bull Air Race World Championship was the seventh official Red Bull Air Race World Championship series. The 2009 champion was Paul Bonhomme, who won the series for the first time.

== Aircraft and pilots ==
Pilot	Aircraft	No.
(Austria) Hannes Arch	Edge 540	28
(United Kingdom) Paul Bonhomme	Edge 540	55
(United States) Kirby Chambliss	Edge 540	4
(United States) Mike Mangold	Edge 540	11
(Hungary) Péter Besenyei	MXS-R	5
(United Kingdom) Nigel Lamb	MXS-R	9
(Spain) Alejandro Maclean	MXS-R	36
(France) Nicolas Ivanoff	Edge 540	27
(United States) Michael Goulian	Edge 540	99
(Russia) Sergey Rakhmanin	MXS-R	18
(South Africa) Glen Dell	Edge 540	45
(Germany) Matthias Dolderer	Edge 540	21
(Australia) Matt Hall	MXS-R	95
(Canada) Pete McLeod	Edge 540	84
(Japan) Yoshihide Muroya	Edge 540	31

=== New pilots ===
Four new pilots joined the Red Bull Air Race Series for the 2009 season as Steve Jones left the series. They were Matthias Dolderer from Germany, Matt Hall from Australia, Yoshihide Muroya from Japan and Pete McLeod from Canada. McLeod was the youngest pilot in the history of the series, joining at 25 years of age.

== Race calendar and results ==
Round	Location	Country	Date	Fastest Qualifying	Winning Pilot	Winning Aircraft
1	(United Arab Emirates) Mina' Zayid, Abu Dhabi	United Arab Emirates	April 17–18	(Austria) Hannes Arch	(Austria) Hannes Arch	Edge 540
2	(United States) San Diego, California	United States	May 9–10	(Austria) Hannes Arch	(France) Nicolas Ivanoff	Edge 540
3	(Canada) Windsor, Ontario	Canada	June 13–14	(United States) Kirby Chambliss	(United Kingdom) Paul Bonhomme	Edge 540
4	(Hungary) River Danube, Budapest	Hungary	August 19–20	(United States) Kirby Chambliss	(United States) Michael Goulian	Edge 540
5	(Portugal) River Douro, Porto	Portugal	September 12–13	(United Kingdom) Paul Bonhomme	(United Kingdom) Paul Bonhomme	Edge 540
6	(Spain) Barcelona	Spain	October 3–4	(Austria) Hannes Arch	(United Kingdom) Paul Bonhomme	Edge 540

== Championship standings ==
Rank	Pilot	UAE (United Arab Emirates)	USA (United States)	CAN (Canada)	HUN (Hungary)	POR (Portugal)	ESP (Spain)	Total points
1	(United Kingdom) Paul Bonhomme	2	2	1	2	1*	1	67
2	(Austria) Hannes Arch	1*	3*	2	4	2	4*	60
3	(Australia) Matt Hall	5	5	7	7	3	9	36
4	(United States) Kirby Chambliss	9	12	3*	3*	8	5	34
5	(France) Nicolas Ivanoff	3	1	9	8	12	7	33
6	(United Kingdom) Nigel Lamb	4	6	8	9	11	2	32
7	(United States) Mike Mangold	7	7	4	6	5	11	32
8	(Hungary) Péter Besenyei	10	4	DNS	10	4	8	24
9	(Germany) Matthias Dolderer	11	13	13	5	6	3	23
10	(United States) Michael Goulian	14	14	6	1	9	11	22
11	(Russia) Sergey Rakhmanin	6	8	5	15	13	13	17
12	(Spain) Alejandro Maclean	8	10	10	11	7	10	16
13	(South Africa) Glen Dell	12	9	12	14	2	15	13
14	(Japan) Yoshihide Muroya	13	11	DNS	12	10	6	9
15	(Canada) Pete McLeod	15	15	11	13	14	12	1
Rank	Pilot	UAE (United Arab Emirates)	USA (United States)	CAN (Canada)	HUN (Hungary)	POR (Portugal)	ESP (Spain)	Total points

(*) indicates the pilot received an extra point for the fastest time in Qualifying

Position	1st	2nd	3rd	4th	5th	6th	7th	8th	9th	10th	11th	12th	13th	14th	15th	Qualifying Fastest
Points	12	10	9	8	7	6	5	4	3	2	1	0	0	0	0	1
