= Glen Dell =

South African commercial airline trainer and aerobatics pilot

- Born: Glen Kennelly Dell; 9 April 1962; Johannesburg, South Africa
- Died: 12 October 2013 (aged 51); Johannesburg, South Africa
- Cause of death: Aircrash
- Aviation career

Racing career
- First race: 2008
- Best position: 12th (2008)
- Aircraft: Zivko Edge 540

Glen Dell (9 April 1962 – 12 October 2013) was a South African commercial airline trainer and aerobatics pilot, who was qualified to race in the Red Bull Air Race World Championship in seasons 2008 and 2009.

== Biography ==
Dell's father was a World War II pilot, and he himself got his Private Pilot License around the year 1979. He then joined the South African Air Force to fly helicopters. After obtaining his Commercial Pilot License, he joined South African Airways in 1994, where he became a Senior Training Captain.

In 2003, the competition aircraft Glen owned was built from traditional aluminium and the plane was considered heavy when compared to the newer composite designs emerging from Europe and the USA. In view of upgrading to a competitive composite aircraft and after extensive research, Glen decided to explore the option of producing a locally designed and manufactured aerobatic aircraft.

Glen approached a small and relatively unknown aviation company specialising in composite aircraft manufacturing, Aerocam. Based in Centurion, Pretoria, Aerocam had a good reputation within the aviation industry for innovative, high technological design and manufacturing capabilities. Aerocam's credentials include the design and development of composite aircraft components for various sectors within aviation. These include military RPV design and manufacture, commercial production of King Air 200 series cargo pods and chemical spray systems for specialised oil spill treatment aircraft. Civilian projects undertaken consist of assembly of various composite kit aircraft including Thunder Mustang and Sea Wind and the production of the Celstar GA-1 competition aerobatic glider in which won a gold and silver at the 1989 World Championships.

Celstar GA-1

Aerocam went about producing an aircraft that would be competitive at International level. In just one year the prototype aircraft took to the air and was branded the Slick 360. This craft was used to secure the 2004 National title for Glen.

Starting in 1985, he won the National Aerobatic Championships in various categories 12 times. He competed in the World Aerobatic Championships since 1994, and became Advanced World Aerobatic Champion in 2004.

Dell died in Sunninghill Hospital in Johannesburg suffering burns sustained when his aircraft, an Extra EA-330 crashed on 12 October 2013 at the Secunda Airshow in Secunda, Mpumalanga.

== Red Bull Air Races ==
He first flight dated 2008 in the Red Bull Air Race World Series.

(South Africa) Glen Dell at the Red Bull Air Race World Series
Year	1	2	3	4	5	6	7	8	9	10	11	12	Points	Wins	Rank
2008	(United Arab Emirates); 12th	(United States); 12th	(United States); 11th	(Sweden); CAN	(Netherlands); 12th	(United Kingdom); 10th	(Hungary); 11th	(Portugal); 12th	(Spain); CAN	(Australia); 12th			0	0	12th

Legend:

- CAN: Cancelled
- DNP: Did not participate
- DNS: Did not show
- DQ: Disqualified
- NC: Not classified

== See also ==
- Competition aerobatics
