= Pascale Alajouanine =

French aviator and aerobatics champion

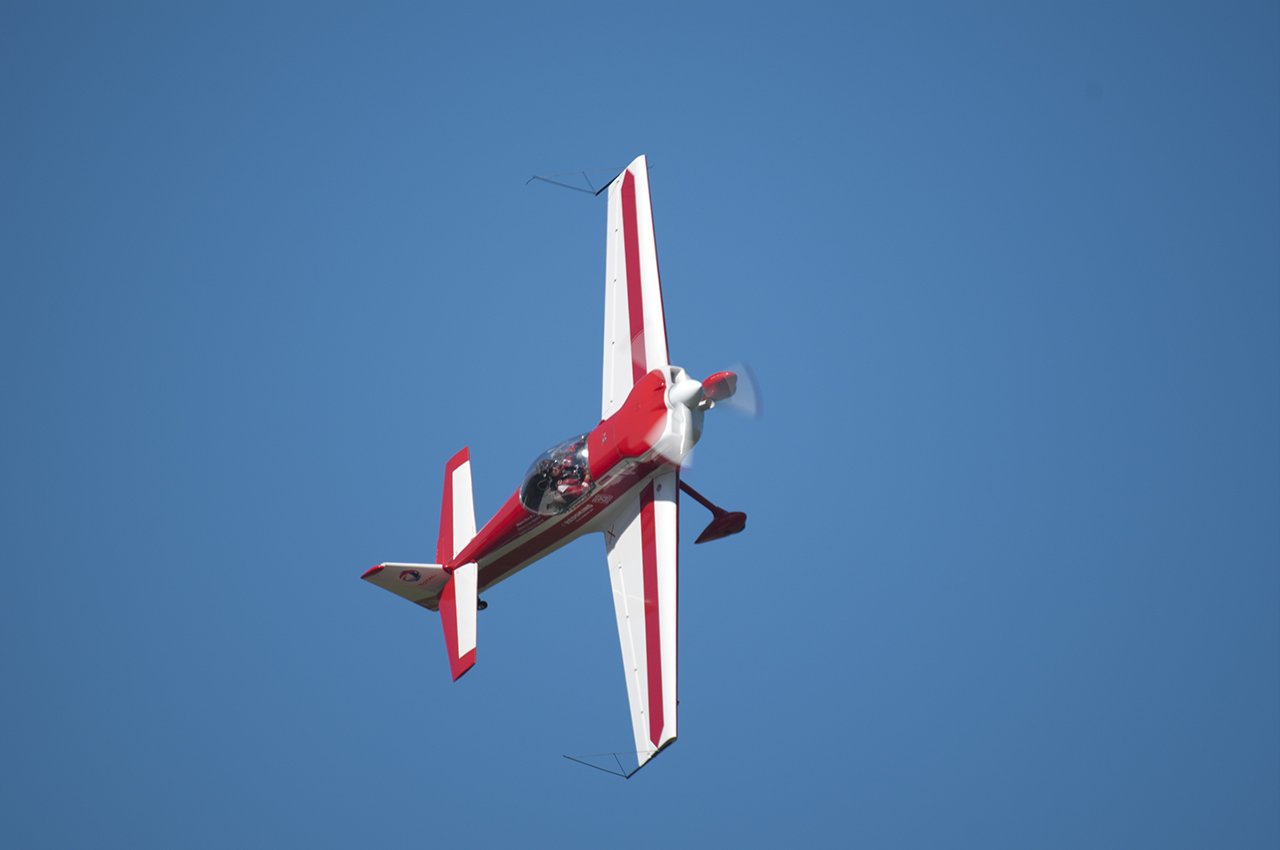
Pascale Alajouanine's mudry cap 232 at Guiscriff airshow 2010

Pascale Alajouanine (born 23 April 1955) is a French aviator and aerobatics champion.

Alajouanine was born in Hazebrouck, Nord, France. She works part-time as an optician. She is a member of the French national aerobatics team and a CAP10 champion in France. She also flies CAP 232 aircraft.
