= Marche Verte =

- Marche Verte patch
- Active: 1988 – present
- Country: Morocco
- Branch: Royal Moroccan Air Force
- Role: Aerobatic flight display team
- Size: 7 Aircraft
- Colours: Red, Yellow, Green

Aircraft flown
- Trainer: Avions Mudry & Cie CAP 232
- Transport: CASA CN-235.

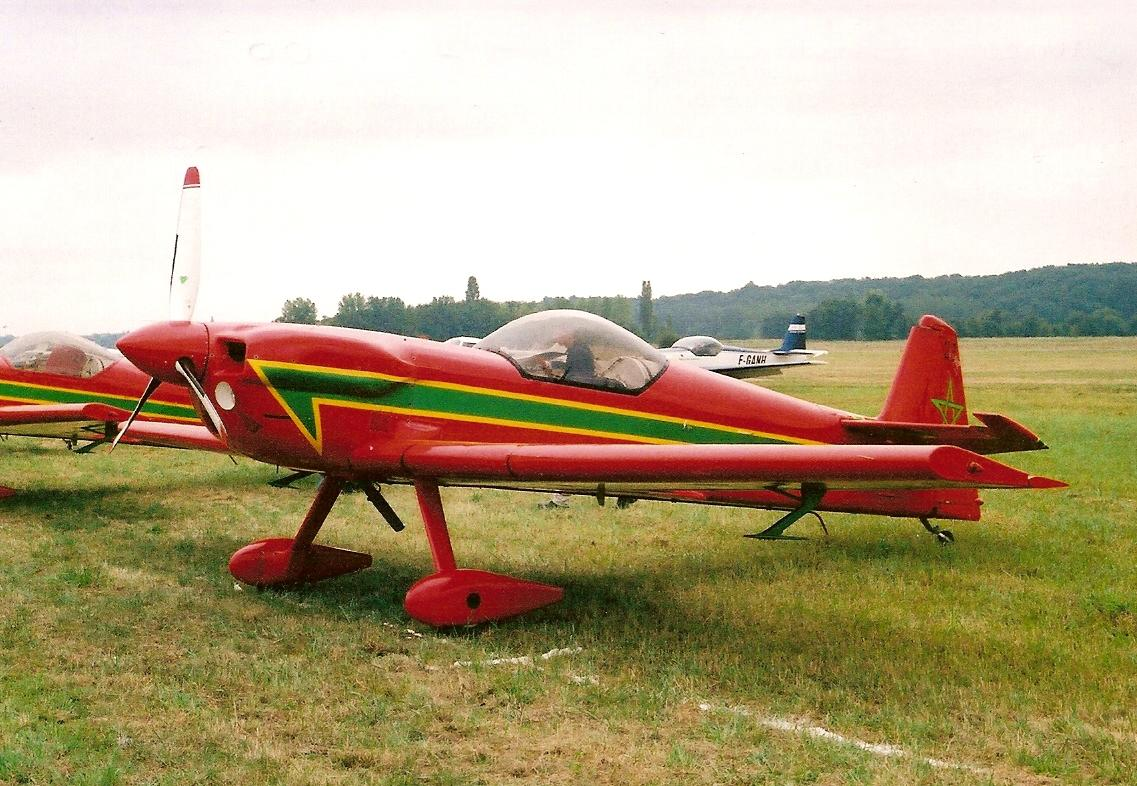
A Mudry CAP 230 of the Marche Verte aerobatic team

Marche Verte (English: Green March) is the aerobatic demonstration team of the Royal Moroccan Air Force and the official aerobatic team of Morocco. The Marche Verte is named for the 1975 "Green March. The team was formed in 1988 when French pilot Jean-Pierre Otelli was tasked with establishing an aerobatic team. Initially, the team consisted of only two planes. In the course of time this was increased to seven.

For aerobatic display purposes the team uses the French built trainer Avions Mudry & Cie CAP 232. The support plane is a twin-turbo-prop CASA CN-235.

== Fleet ==
- 7 Avions Mudry & Cie CAP 232
- 1 CASA CN-235

== See also ==
- Royal Moroccan Air Force
- History of Western Sahara
