= Victor Tchmal =

Russian aerobatic pilot (1960–2015)

Victor Tchmal (13 October 1960 – 14 June 2015) was a Russian glider and powered aerobatic pilot.

He won the 18th FAI World (Powered) Aerobatic Championships 1996 in Oklahoma City flying a Sukhoi Su-26. In the 6th FAI World Glider Aerobatic Championships in Fayence in 1995 he won the team gold medal together with Mikhail Mamistov and Sergey Rakhmanin. They all flew Swift S-1.
