= Mudry CAP 20 =

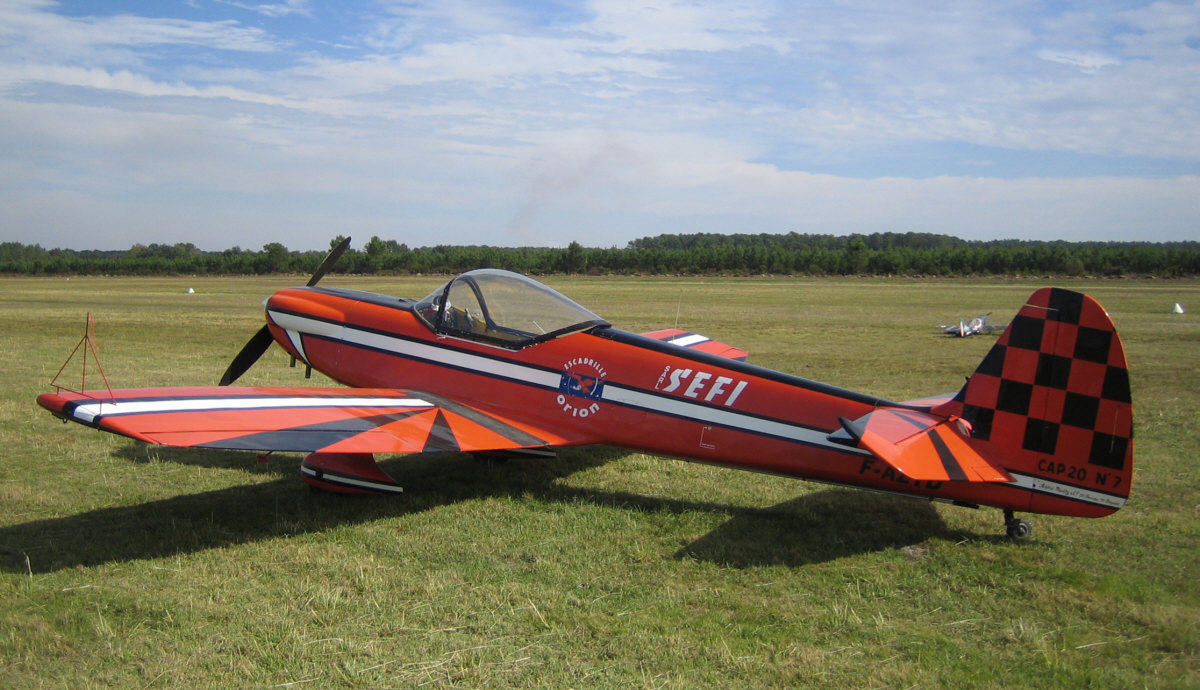
- CAP-20 #7 in 2007

General information
- Type: Single-seat aerobatic monoplane
- Manufacturer: Avions Mudry
- Number built: 12

History
- Manufactured: November 1976 to July 1979
- Introduction date: November 1976
- First flight: 15 January 1976

The Mudry CAP 20 is a French family of aerobatic competition single seater monoplanes.

== Design and development ==
The Mudry CAP 20 was developed at the same time as the CAP 10, as a single-seat aerobatic version. It was followed by a lightweight version designated the CAP 20L which in turn was replaced by the CAP 21 with more advanced wing.

The CAP 20 was developed as a single-seat acrobatic version of the company's CAP 10; it was used by the French Air Force's flying demonstration team, Equipe de Voltige Aerienne. The CAP 20L is externally similar to the 20, but is a structurally new design. The wing planform is more angular; the dihedral is less (1.5 degrees); the fuselage cross-section is distinct, with a rounded top (the 20 used a triangular-shaped top deck). Its dimensions are slightly reduced, and the empty weight was considerably lower (the L stands for leger, or light).

Production of the 20L was suspended in July 1979, when managers decided to improve its wing design. However, when the new wing was introduced, the overall design was tweaked to the point that a new designation (CAP 21) was used to designate the series.

The CAP-21 was then developed as the CAP-230.

== Variants ==
CAP 20
Initial version, 9 aircraft (1 CAP-20, 3 CAP-20A, 4 CAP-20B, 1 CAP-20E)
CAP 20L-180
Lightweight variant powered by a 180 hp (134 kW) Avco Lycoming piston engine, only one aircraft produced.
CAP 20LS-200
Lightweight variant powered by a 200 hp (149 kW) Avco Lycoming IO-360-RCF piston engine, 12 aircraft.
CAP 21
Improved version with new advanced aerofoil section wing and new landing gear, 18 aircraft.
CAP-21-260
A CAP-21 retrofitted with a 260 hp (194 kW) engine.

== Operators ==
France

- French Air Force (CAP 20)

== Specifications (CAP 21) ==
Data from Jane's All The World's Aircraft 1988-89

General characteristics

- Crew: 1
- Length: 6.46 m (21 ft 2 in)
- Wingspan: 8.08 m (26 ft 6 in)
- Height: 1.52 m (5 ft 0 in)
- Wing area: 9.2 m^{2} (99 sq ft)
- Airfoil: V16F
- Empty weight: 500 kg (1,102 lb)
- Max takeoff weight: 620 kg (1,367 lb)
- Powerplant: 1 × Textron Lycoming IO-360-A1B 4-cyl. air-cooled horizontally-opposed piston engine
- Propellers: 2-bladed Hartzell constant-speed propeller

Performance

- Maximum speed: 299 km/h (186 mph, 161 kn)
- Cruise speed: 265 km/h (165 mph, 143 kn)
- Stall speed: 85 km/h (53 mph, 46 kn)
- Never exceed speed: 380 km/h (240 mph, 210 kn)
- Endurance: 2 hours
- g limits: +6 -5
- Rate of climb: 14 m/s (2,800 ft/min)
