= MX Aircraft MX2 =

MX2
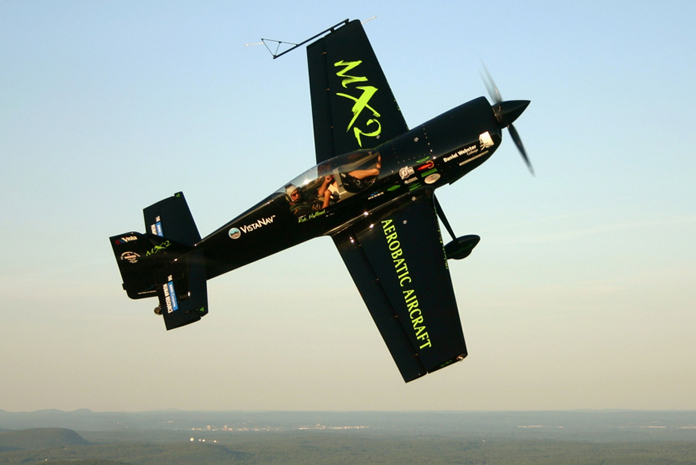
- Rob Holland Flies his MX2 near Nashua, NH

General information
- Type: Aerobatic
- National origin: Australia
- Manufacturer: MX Aircraft

History
- First flight: 2002
- Developed from: Giles G-202

The MX2 is a carbon fiber, two seat tandem sport aircraft produced by MX Aircraft of Perth, Western Australia. The MX2 has been used by competitors in the annual Red Bull Air Race World Championship.

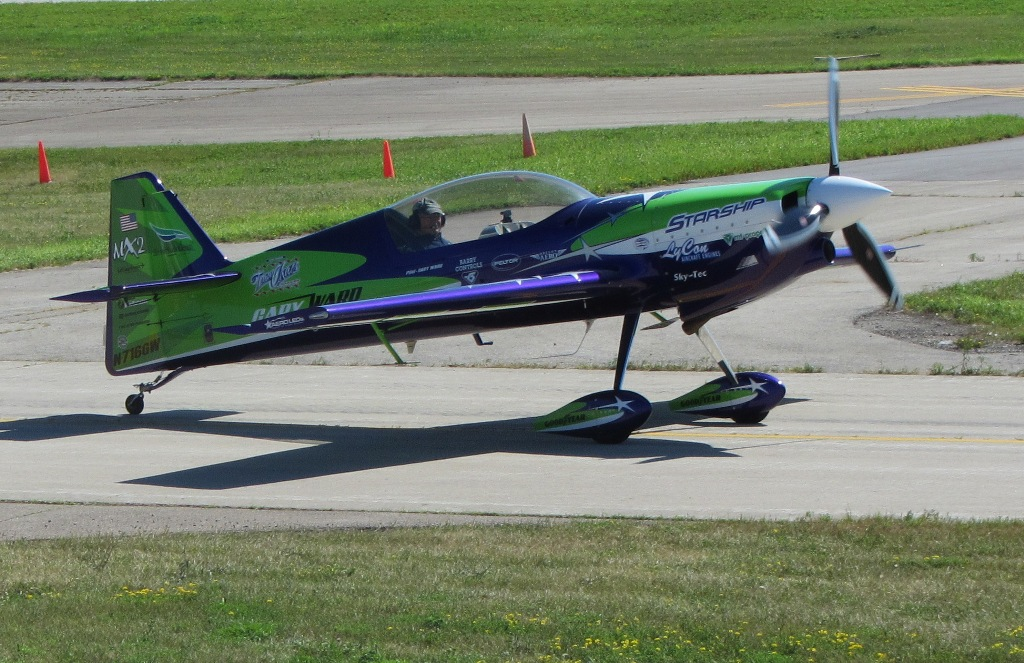
Gary Ward MX2

== Design and development ==
The MX2 was based on the Giles G-202 aerobatic trainer, the first prototype was a modified G-202 and first flew in May 2002. The first aircraft of the initial production batch of five first flew in May 2005. The MX2 is a carbon-fibre low wing cantilever monoplane with full span ailerons and a conventional landing gear with a tailwheel. It has an enclosed cockpit for two in tandem on reclining seats and a single piece canopy. The MX2 is powered by a 260 hp (194 kW) Lycoming IO-540 flat-six piston engine with a three-blade tractor propeller. Optimised for aerobatic speed and agility the MX2 can pull a G-load of plus and minus 14 Gs, giving it tight turns and loops and a range of aerobatic maneuvers.

Rob Holland won the 2008 World Advanced Aerobatic Championships in an MX2 and the 2018 US National Aerobatic Championships.

An MX2 raced a Supermarine Spitfire around the Isle of Wight for the 70th anniversary of the first Spitfire produced. The Spitfire won.

== Specifications ==
Data from Jane's All the World's Aircraft 2008-2009

General characteristics

- Crew: 2
- Length: 21 ft 6 in (6.55 m)
- Wingspan: 24 ft 0 in (7.32 m)
- Height: 6 ft 0 in (1.83 m)
- Wing area: 102 sq ft (9.5 m^{2})
- Empty weight: 1,287 lb (584 kg)
- Gross weight: 2,150 lb (975 kg)
- Powerplant: 1 × Lycoming IO-540 flat-six piston engine, 260 hp (194 kW)

Performance

- Maximum speed: 220 kn (253 mph, 407 km/h)
- Stall speed: 58 kn (67 mph, 108 km/h)
- g limits: ±12
- Roll rate: 420°/s

== See also ==
Related development

- CAP Aviation CAP-222
- MX Aircraft MXS
