= Mikhail Mamistov =

Russian aerobatic pilot (born 1961)

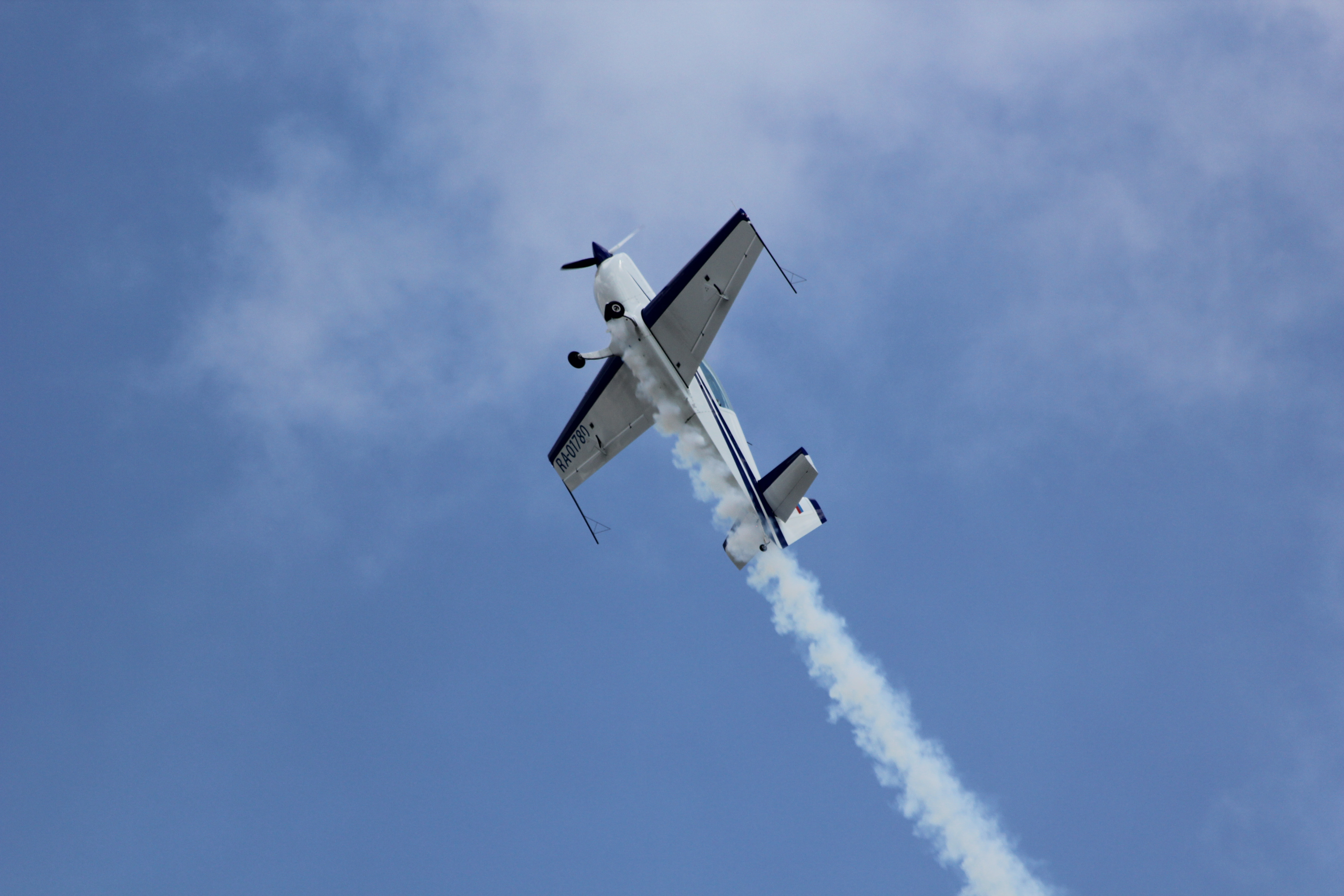
Mikhail Mamistov with Extra 300L aircraft over Helsinki-Malmi airport.

Mikhail Mamistov (born 26 April 1961, in Leningrad), is a Russian powered and glider aerobatic pilot.

== Glider aerobatics ==
He won the FAI World Glider Aerobatic Championships 1995 and 1997, and the FAI European Glider Aerobatic Championships 1996.

== Powered aerobatics ==
In 2001 he won the FAI World (Powered) Aerobatic Championships and World Air Games Powered Aerobatic Championships. In 2006 and 2008 he won the FAI European (Powered) Aerobatic Championships. In September 2017, he won the World Aerobatic Championship in Malelane, South Africa, flying the Extra 330SC.

== See also ==
- Competition aerobatics
- FAI World Aerobatic Championships
- FAI European Aerobatic Championships
