= Lockheed Trophy =

Freestyle aerobatics award

The Lockheed Trophy was awarded for freestyle aerobatics

The Lockheed Trophy was awarded in freestyle aerobatic competition held in England from 1955 to 1965. The trophy was superseded by the Biancotto Trophy competition, named after three-time Lockheed trophy winner Leon Biancotto, who died in competition in 1962

== History ==
In 1963 the Lockheed trophy competition was held during the Baginton National Air Race.
