= MX Aircraft MXS =

Aircraft

MXS
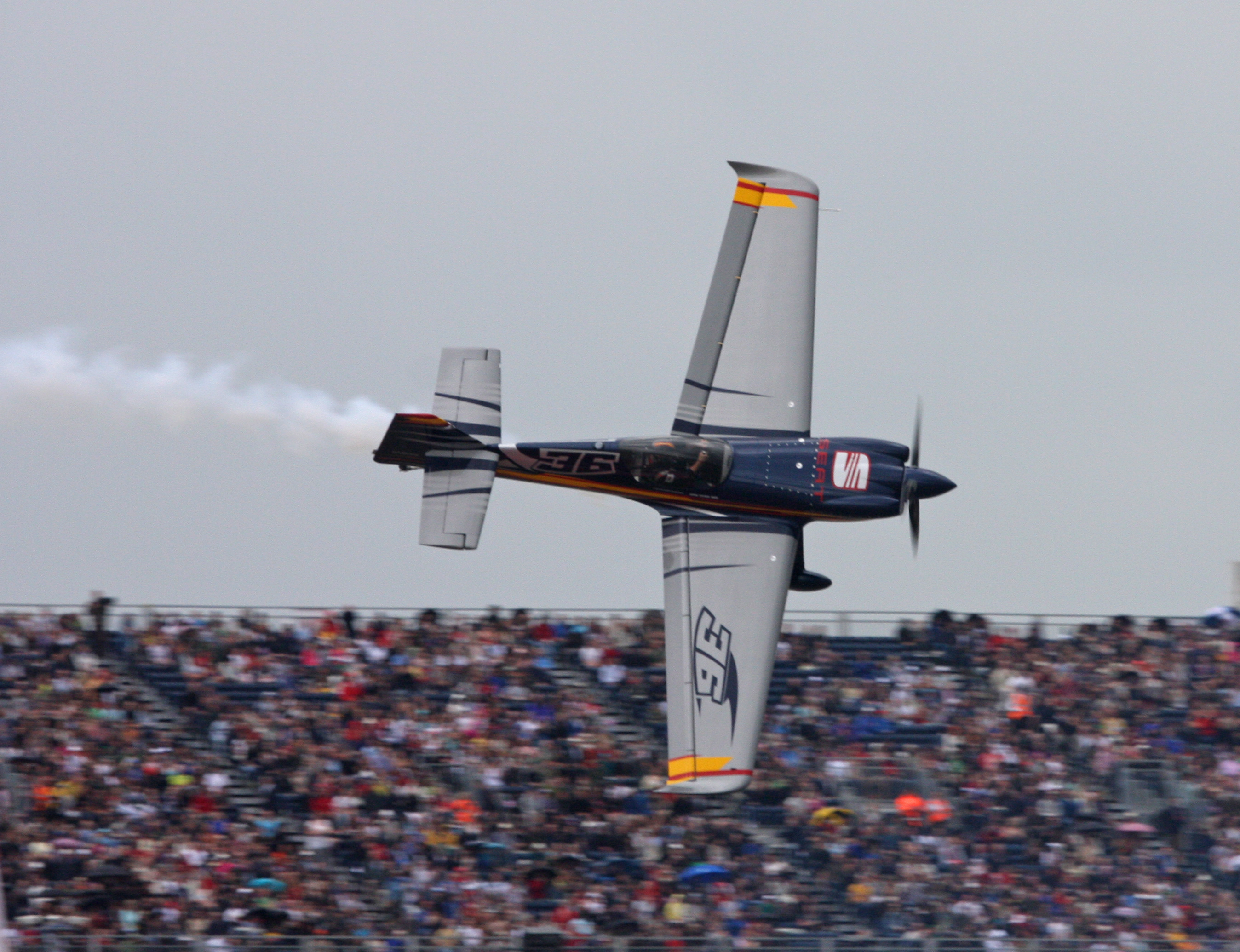

General information
- Type: Aerobatic monoplane
- National origin: Perth Western, Australia
- Manufacturer: MX Aircraft
- Status: Active

The MXS is a single-seat aerobatic aircraft made of carbon fiber and built by MX Aircraft Company, a manufacturer located at Jandakot Airport in Perth, Western Australia. The MXS-R is a race variant flown by several pilots in the Red Bull Air Race World Championship. The planes are all-composite in construction, piston-powered, low-wing monoplanes. They are produced both in kit form for amateur construction, and completed ready to fly at the factory.

The MXS has won an entire decade of US Nationals Aerobatic Championships and World 4 Minute Free Style Championships and is regarded as the highest performance aerobatic airplane in the world. Pilot Rob Holland won the Eric Muller Trophy flying a MXS at the 2019 World Aerobatic championships.

The two-seat version is called the MX2 and has reached notable fame, becoming World Aerobatic Advanced Champion under the control of Rob Holland in 2008 and also vice-world aerobatics advanced champion in 2010.

== Specifications ==
Data from MXS Homepage

General characteristics

- Crew: one pilot
- Capacity: one (pilot only)
- Length: 6.51 m (21.35 ft)
- Wingspan: 7.3 m (24 ft)
- Height: 1.8 m (6 ft)
- Empty weight: 572 kg (1,260 lb)
- Gross weight: 726 kg (1,600 lb)
- Max takeoff weight: 835 kg (1,840 lb)
- Fuel capacity: 219.55 litre (58 US gal) (optional long range 295.26 litre (78 US gal))
- Powerplant: 1 × Lycoming AEIO-540EXP MT Propeller MTV9 203 20D blades, 190–280 kW (250–380 hp) Hartzell 3 blade "Claw" counterweighted propeller

Performance

- Maximum speed: 426 km/h (265 mph, 230 kn)
- Cruise speed: 330 km/h (210 mph, 180 kn)
- Stall speed: 107 km/h (67 mph, 58 kn)
- Never exceed speed: 430 km/h (260 mph, 230 kn)
- Range: 1,390 km (860 mi, 750 nmi)
- Rate of climb: 18 m/s (3,500 ft/min)
- Roll rate: 420°/sec

== See also ==
- Zivko Edge 540
- Corvus Racer 540
- Extra EA-300

Related development

- CAP Aviation CAP-222
- MX Aircraft MX2
