= British Aerobatic Association =

UK sport governing body

- Abbreviation: BAeA
- Formation: 1 May 1974; 52 years ago

The British Aerobatic Association (BAeA) handles all domestic aerobatic competitions in the United Kingdom.

== History ==
The association was formed on 1 May 1974. Its members teach and fly aerobatics at many airfields across the United Kingdom. The association is recognised by Royal Aero Club as the governing body of sport aerobatics.

== Activities ==
The BAeA holds 12-14 aerobatic events around the UK and Ireland each year.
