= Mudry CAP 230 =

Aerobatic aircraft family

CAP 232
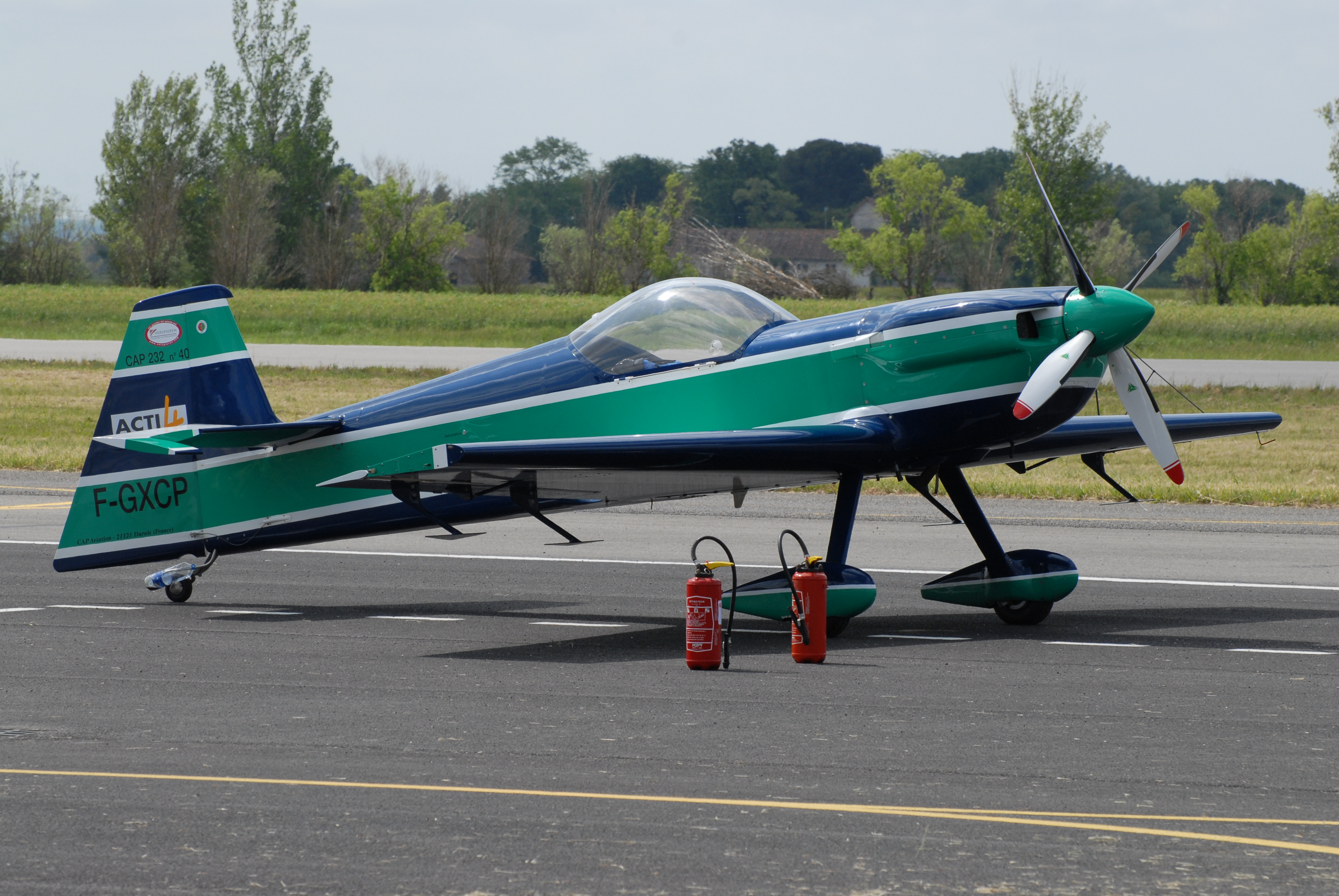
- CAP-232 at Airexpo 2007

General information
- Type: Competition aerobatic aircraft
- Manufacturer: Avions Mudry & Cie (now Apex Aircraft)
- Primary user: Moroccan Air Force

History
- Introduction date: 1998
- First flight: 1997
- Developed from: Mudry CAP-20

The CAP Aviation CAP-23x family is a family of aircraft designed for competition aerobatics. The CAP 230 airframe was a direct development of the CAP 21 competition single seater strengthened to cope with a 300 hp (220 kW) 6-cylinder Lycoming AEIO-540 engine instead of the 200 hp (150 kW) original 4-cylinder Lycoming AEIO-360.

== Design and development ==
The CAP 230 was primarily developed in 1985 for the French Air Force. From the basic CAP 21 airframe, trailing edge apex triangular surfaces were added to the basic trapezoidal wing and a full wooden construction. It withstood +10/-10 G-forces, had a 270 degrees/second roll rate and a top speed of 400 km/h. Between 1986-1990 this was the mount of the French Air Force aerobatics team (French: Equipe de Voltige de l'Armée de l'Air).

The CAP 231 was developed in 1990. The fuselage design remained unchanged and only leading edge triangular apex surfaces were added to reduce buffeting during high G pullups. The CAP 231 was world champion in 1990. Between 1990-1998 this was the mount of the French Air Force aerobatics team.

To increase performance, in 1991, a carbon-fiber wing taken from an EXTRA 260 (thus the -EX name) was adapted to a few CAP 231 airframes.

The CAP 231EX evolved in 1994. While the fuselage construction retained wood, a carbon-fiber wing was specially designed for durability and light weight. The design has won the World Championships in 1998, 2000 and 2007, as well as a number of other national-level competitions. It has a roll rate of 420° per second and a climb rate of nearly 3,300 feet per minute.

The CAP 232 just like the -230 and -231/-231EX were slightly modified to strengthen the fuselage structure after a fatal accident in 2005 which grounded them for a full year. Fuselage rib n°2 holding the landing gear and the wing spar has been reinforced externally and internally. The planes are now back to competition and came second (individual with a -231EX), sixth with a -232, and first team at the WAC 2007. In the years 1999-2005, examples were flown by the French Air Force aerobatics team.

== Operators ==
=== Military ===
Morocco
8 aircraft, flown by the Royal Moroccan Air Force air display team Marche Verte
France
The French Air Force aerobatic team owned CAP 230, 231 and 232

=== Civilian ===
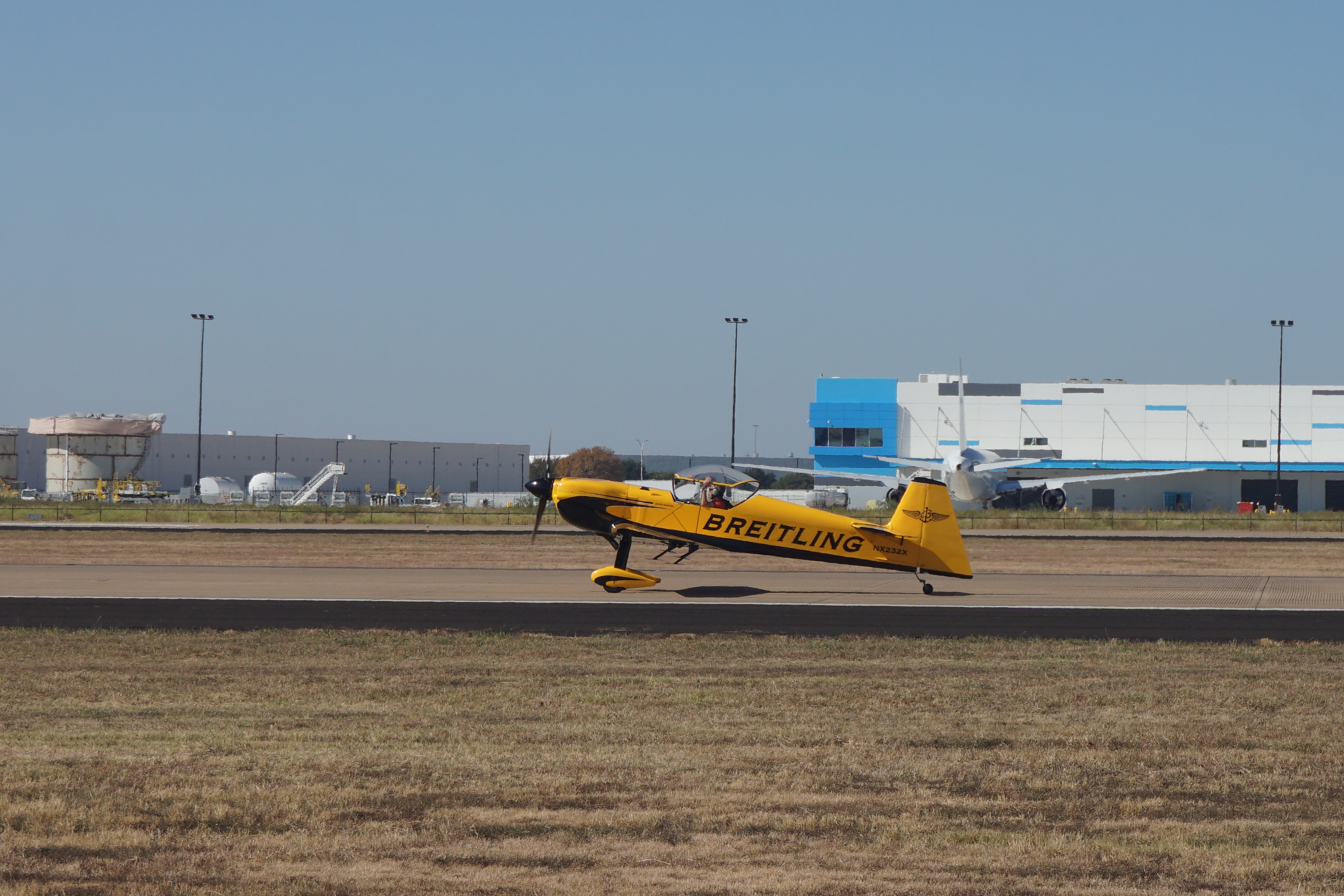
Mike Gallaway's Mudry CAP 230 at the 2019 Fort Worth Alliance Air Show

Airclubs and privates own planes of all subtypes.

== Specifications (CAP 231) ==
Data from Jane's All The World's Aircraft 1993–94

General characteristics

- Crew: 1
- Length: 6.75 m (22 ft 2 in)
- Wingspan: 8.08 m (26 ft 6 in)
- Height: 1.9 m (6 ft 3 in)
- Wing area: 9.86 m^{2} (106.1 sq ft)
- Airfoil: V16F (16%)
- Empty weight: 630 kg (1,389 lb)
- Gross weight: 730 kg (1,609 lb)
- Max takeoff weight: 820 kg (1,808 lb)
- Fuel capacity: 65 L (17 US gal; 14 imp gal)
- Powerplant: 1 × Lycoming AEIO-540-L1 B5D 6-cylinder air-cooled horizontally-opposed piston engine, 224 kW (300 hp)
- Propellers: 3 or 4-bladed constant-speed propeller

Performance

- Maximum speed: 330 km/h (210 mph, 180 kn)
- Cruise speed: 300 km/h (190 mph, 160 kn)
- Stall speed: 90 km/h (56 mph, 49 kn)
- Never exceed speed: 400 km/h (250 mph, 220 kn)
- Range: 360 km (220 mi, 190 nmi)
- g limits: ±10
- Roll rate: 270°/s at 300 km/h (190 mph; 160 kn)
- Rate of climb: 16 m/s (3,100 ft/min)
- Wing loading: 74 kg/m^{2} (15 lb/sq ft)
- Power/mass: 0.31 kW/kg (0.19 hp/lb)

== See also ==
Aircraft of comparable role, configuration, and era

- Zivko Edge 540
- Sukhoi Su-26
- Extra 300
