= Competition aerobatics =

Air sport

Competition aerobatics is an air sport in which ground-based judges rate the skill of pilots performing aerobatic flying. It is practised in both piston-powered single-engine airplanes and also gliders.

An aerobatic competition is sanctioned by a national aero club, its designee, or in the case of international competitions, by CIVA, the Commission Internationale de Voltige Aerienne, which is a constituent body of the Fédération Aéronautique Internationale (FAI). The sanctioning body establishes the rules that apply to the competition, including entry qualifications for all participants, operating procedures, and judging criteria.

A pilot enters a competition in a category of their choice, which defines the level of difficulty of the aerobatic sequences to be flown. Within each category, a pilot flies one or more flight programs. Each flight receives a total score from the judges; ranking each pilot's combined total scores for all flight programs within each category determines that category's winner.

== Categories ==
Five power categories are flown in the U.S. (and other countries that adopt the BAeA model). They vary by difficulty of the individual aerobatic maneuvers they contain, as well as the combination of those maneuvers within the sequence. In order of increasing difficulty, the power categories are:

- Primary (elsewhere: Club, Espoir)
- Sportsman (elsewhere Sports); earlier in the UK "Standard".
- Intermediate/Yak-52
- Advanced, Avancée
- Unlimited

Some aero clubs include a Classic category for airplanes without inverted fuel and oil systems. The sequences flown are similar to those flown in the Sportsman category. A one-design Yak-52 class exists in many countries which is flown in conjunction with the intermediate class.

Four glider categories are:

- Sportsman or Sports
- Intermediate
- Advanced
- Unlimited

Categories flown in a competition are announced in advance.

== Flight programs ==
Within each category, each pilot flies one or more flight programs. They are:

- Known: Determined each year by the national aero club. It is flown by all competitors at all contests all year long. In the past this was known as the Q (for qualifying) program.
- Free Known: At FAI championships each pilot integrates 5 'Known' figures with 5 of their own that are freely selected from the Aresti Catalog so that together the 10 figures meet the specified overall versatility and total-K (difficulty) requirements.
- Free: In this program, each pilot is given the opportunity to demonstrate his personal flying skills, creative talent and his aircraft performance by designing his own sequence.
- Unknown: This program is made known to the contestants only about 12 hours before the competition. The figures are chosen by either teams or pilots, each submitting a single figure. Under CIVA rules pilots fly up to three Free Unknown sequences (see below). In Local contests often the governing body or the contest chief judge choose the unknown sequence. The pilots must not practice before flying the unknown sequence. (For classes Intermediate and above.)
- Free Unknown: Teams or pilots together select 10 figures (7 for gliders) that they must all use in a similar fashion to the Free Known system, adding up to 4 additional figures (2 for gliders) that are employed principally to reposition or turn-around the aircraft to ensure smooth continuity of the whole sequence.
- 4-minute Free or Final Freestyle: Only the top unlimited pilots might be invited to fly this final program. In this program pilots strive to display their creativity and superior skills as performers, the judging here being almost entirely subjective as opposed to objective assessments of figures according to the Aresti system as used for all other programs.

== Aerobatic box ==

The aerobatic box is a volume of airspace in which the aircraft must remain while performing a sequence. Its length and width are each 1,000 metres (3,280 ft). Its height varies based on whether FAI, national aero club or local rules apply to the competition. White ground markers at each corner of the box make it visible to the pilot from the air. For most categories, penalties are assessed for flight outside the aerobatic box.

The box has two axes, the identification of which is based on the location of the judges. The X-Axis (called the A-Axis by some aero clubs), runs across the line of sight of the judges. It is along this axis that most figures are usually flown. In some contests a center line is marked along the middle of the X-Axis.

The Y-Axis (called the B-Axis by some aero clubs) runs perpendicular to the X-Axis, toward and away from the judges. This axis is used for cross-box position correction. The official wind direction is always declared by contest officials to be along the X-Axis. This, however, does not always reflect reality, and generally during the course of a sequence the competitor will drift either toward or away from the judging line. The competitor can extend or shorten maneuvers flown along the Y-Axis to obtain the desired positioning.

The box floor is as high as 460 metres (1,510 ft) above ground level (AGL) for Primary level competitors and as low as 100 metres (328 ft) AGL for Unlimited level competitors. The box ceiling is as high as 1,000 metres (3,280 ft) above its floor. Before a category starts, a competitor will mark the box by flying along its boundaries at its floor. This allows the judges to visualize the box in the sky and prepares them to adjudge an aircraft flying below the box floor.

At a groundspeed of 300 kilometres per hour (190 mph) the pilot has 12 seconds from entering the box on the one side before exiting the box on the other.

== Judging ==
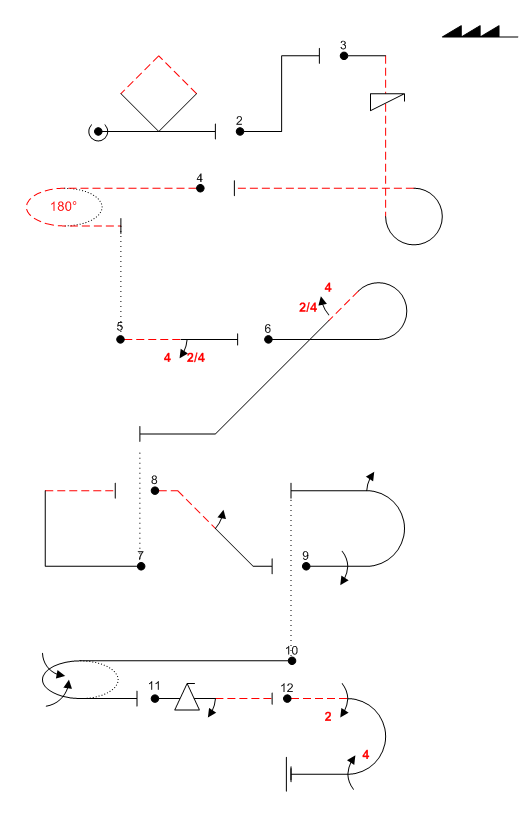
An aerobatic sequence in Aresti notation.

Each category within a competition may have between 3 and 9 grading judges, each of whom is accredited by the contest's sanctioning body. They are positioned between 150 and 250 metres (490 and 820 ft) back from the edge of the box, at the center of the X-Axis and facing that axis. Each grading judge is assisted by an assistant judge, who reads Aresti notation and verbalizes to the grading judge each figure to be flown, and if possible also a recorder (also called a writer or scribe), who records the judges marks and comments, commentary and ancillary information on a competitor's score sheet. For some flight programs, a single individual may serve concurrently as assistant judge and recorder.

A grading judge assesses the quality of each figure flown according to well-defined criteria and assigns it a numerical mark in steps of 0.5 between 0 and 10. Under FAI and some national aero clubs' rules, the judge may also assign a mark of "Hard Zero" to indicate that the wrong figure was flown, or a "Perception Zero" if a mandatory though subtle element of the figure is perceived to have been missing. At the conclusion of each flight, the grading judge assigns a Presentation or Positioning mark based on the competitor's placement of figures within the aerobatic box throughout the sequence. A grading judge also determines if the competitor has flown below the floor of the box or above its ceiling. Each grading judge is further charged with assessing whether a competitor is flying safely and advocating for the competitor's disqualification if not.

A chief judge oversees the operation of the judging line. He or she is often responsible for sequencing competitors into the aerobatic box, identifying and resolving judging and safety issues, reviewing the judges marking sheets, assessing penalties, monitoring the aerobatic box for traffic conflicts, conducting briefings for pilots and judging line personnel, and certifying scores. A chief judge is typically assisted by 2 or more individuals. In some competitions, a chief judge may concurrently serve as a grading judge.

Corner judges (also called boundary judges or line judges) may also be used and are positioned at the edge of the buffer zones, 50 metres (160 ft) along each axis beyond marked corners of the aerobatic box. They monitor and record each excursion beyond the buffer zone; the competitor earns a penalty for each such excursion. Each corner judge guards 2 of the 4 lines that define the box. In most competitions, 2 corner judges are used, located at opposing corners. Two judges guard each line; they must agree that a competitor has crossed a boundary in order for the competitor earn a penalty. In FAI championships more accurate electronic feedback systems are required to provide a constant measurement of the aircraft position, and hence its excursions beyond the buffer zone if these occur; if such equipment is not available this task is confined to the judge's position grade.

Deadline judges may be positioned along a deadline, if one has been established by the contest's sanctioning body. They monitor and record each infringement of the deadline. The competitor earns a penalty for each such infringement, that penalty being more severe than an excursion out of the aerobatic box.

== Judging downgrades summary ==
Here is a précis of the principal "faults" that you should look for and the number of marks to deduct whilst you are applying standard CIVA rules of critique to sequence programmes at all levels.

=== At the entry to and exit from every figure element ===
Horizontal start & finish lines	Deduction
Off axis left or right n-deg	1 point/5 deg
Climbing or diving n-deg	1 point/5 deg
One wing low n-deg	1 point/5 deg
No distinct line drawn	1 point each
Flying in wrong direction on the "A" axis	Mark = Hard Zero (HZ)

=== Family 1 - lines and angles ===
Horizontal 45's & verticals	Deduction
Climbing or diving n-deg (before or after roll)	1 point/5 deg
Steep or shallow n-deg (before or after roll)	1 point/5 deg
Positive or negative n-deg (before or after roll)	1 point/5 deg
No line drawn before or after roll	1 point each
Longer or shorter line before or after roll	1 to 3 points

=== Family 2 - turns and rolling turns ===
Turns	Deduction
Rolling entry or exit (i.e. a "co-ordinated" turn)	1 to 2 points
Bank angle too shallow (less than 60 deg)	1 point/5 deg
Bank angle varied	1 point/variation

Rolling turns	Deduction
Roll rate varied	1 point/variation
Roll stopped or turn and then restarted	2 points
Not an even integration of rolls at end	1 point/5 deg
Not enough / too many rolls or a flick-roll seen	Mark = hard zero

Both types	Deduction
Turn rate or radius varied	1 point/variation
Climbing or diving in turn	1 point/5 deg

Exit	Deduction
Was n-deg early or late	1 point/5 deg

=== Family 3 - combinations of lines ===
All figures	Deduction
Smaller or larger 2nd etc. corner	1 to 3 points
Longer or shorter 2nd etc. line	1 to 3 points

=== Family 5 - stall turns ===
Up/down lines	Deduction
Up/down-line pos/neg/left/right n-deg (before or after roll)	1 point/5 deg
Short, long or no line drawn up/down (before or after roll)	1 to 3 points

The turn	Deduction
Turn-around too wide (pivot beyond wingtip)	1 point/wing length
Rolled or pitched n-deg in turn-around	1 point/5 deg
Exit pull or push radius smaller or larger	1 to 3 points

=== Family 6 - tail slides ===
Up/down lines	Deduction
Up/down-line pos/neg/left/right n-deg (before or after roll)	1 point/5 deg (was 2 per 5 - beware!)
Short, long or no line drawn up/down (before or after roll)	1-3 points

The slide	Deduction
No slide seen	Mark = Perception Zero (PZ)
Yawed or rolled n-deg in slide	1 point/5 deg
Exit pull/push radius smaller or larger	1 to 3 points
Pitched the wrong way (wheels up or down)	Mark = Hard Zero (HZ)

=== Family 7 - loops and eights ===
Half & full loops	Deduction
Large or small radius at top or in 1st/2nd etc. quarter	1 to 3 points
Line drawn between roll and looping segment	2 points
Roll not central in looping segment	1 to 3 points
Off axis during looping segment	1 point/5 deg
Higher or lower exit	1 to 3 points

Eights	Deduction
Smaller or larger 2nd half	1 to 3 points
Lower or higher 2nd half (horizontal)	1 to 3 points

With corners	Deduction
Longer or shorter 2nd etc. line length	1 to 3 points
Larger or smaller 2nd etc. corner	1 to 3 points
Up/down-line pos/neg/left/right n-deg {before or after roll}	1 point/5 deg
1st/2nd etc. 45 steep or shallow {before or after roll}	1 point/5 deg
Horizontal segment off axis left/right/up/down	1 point/5 deg

=== Family 8 - combinations of lines, angles and loops ===
Humpty bumps	Deduction
Up/down-line pos/neg/left/right n-deg (before or after roll)	1 point/5 deg
Rolled or yawed in half-loop	1 point/5 deg
Larger or smaller 2nd quarter loop in half-loop	1 to 3 points
Push instead of pull, or pull instead of push	Mark = hard zero

=== Family 9 - rolls and spins ===
Slow rolls	Deduction
Rolled n-deg short or too far	1 point/5 deg
Roll barrelled (pitched and/or yawed whilst rolling)	1 point/5 deg
Roll rate varied	1 point/variation
Axis changed left/right/up/down n-deg during/after roll	1 point/5deg
Hesitation at random point	2 points
Wrong type of roll substituted	Mark = Hard Zero (HZ)

Hesitation rolls	Deduction
Climbed or sank in knife	1 to 2 points
Slower or faster 2nd etc. half/quarter/eighth	1 to 3 points
Under/over rotated 1st/2nd etc. half/quarter/eighth	1 point/5 deg
Hesitation missed (wrong type of roll substituted)	Mark = Hard Zero (HZ)

Flick rolls	Deduction
Part flicked and part aileron'd roll	2 to 5 points
Not flicked (no stall seen)	Mark = Perception Zero (PZ)
Positive instead of negative, or neg instead of pos	Mark = Hard Zero (HZ)

Combinations of rolls	Deduction
Any line between two rolls	At least 2 points
Significant(?) line between rolls	Mark = Hard Zero (HZ)
Same direction when opposite required (or vice versa)	Mark = Hard Zero (HZ)
Wrong number of rolls where linked	Mark = Hard Zero (HZ)

Rolls immediately prior to or just after looping	Deduction
Any line between stopping loop/roll and starting roll/loop	At least 2 points
Roll starts before loop finishes	1 point/5 deg (from required line)
Significant line between rolls	Mark = Hard Zero (HZ)

Spin entry	Deduction
Entry not stalled, and/or "rolled" in – not spinning	Mark = Perception Zero (PZ)
Flicked entry (too fast)	Mark = Perception Zero (PZ)

Spin exit	Deduction
Spin rotation short or too far n-deg	1 point/5 deg
Line after was positive or negative n-deg	1 point/5 deg
No line drawn after	Mark = Hard Zero (HZ)

== In popular culture ==
Several of the aforementioned concepts are shown in the 1980 film Cloud Dancer, whose technical advisor and chief pilot was the former world champion aerobatic pilot Tom Poberezny.

== Governing bodies ==
The FAI is the international governing body for all airborne sports. Its Commission Internationale de Voltige Aerienne (CIVA) governs competition aerobatics. While FAI itself oversees international competitions, it recognizes national aero clubs to regulate competition aerobatics locally. A national aero club often delegates this responsibility to an affiliate organization focused on aerobatics.

In the U.S., the International Aerobatic Club (IAC) is the National Aeronautic Association's delegate for aerobatics. In the UK, the Royal Aero Club designates the British Aerobatic Association (BAeA) to fill this role. In South Africa the FAI appoints the Aeroclub of South Africa which in turn appoints the Sport Aerobatic Club of South Africa to manage all aerobatic events.

== See also ==
- FAI World Grand Prix
- European and World Glider Aerobatic Championships
- List of articles about Aerobatic pilots
- International Aerobatic Club (USA), British Aerobatic Association (UK)
