= List of Red Bull Air Race World Championship winners =

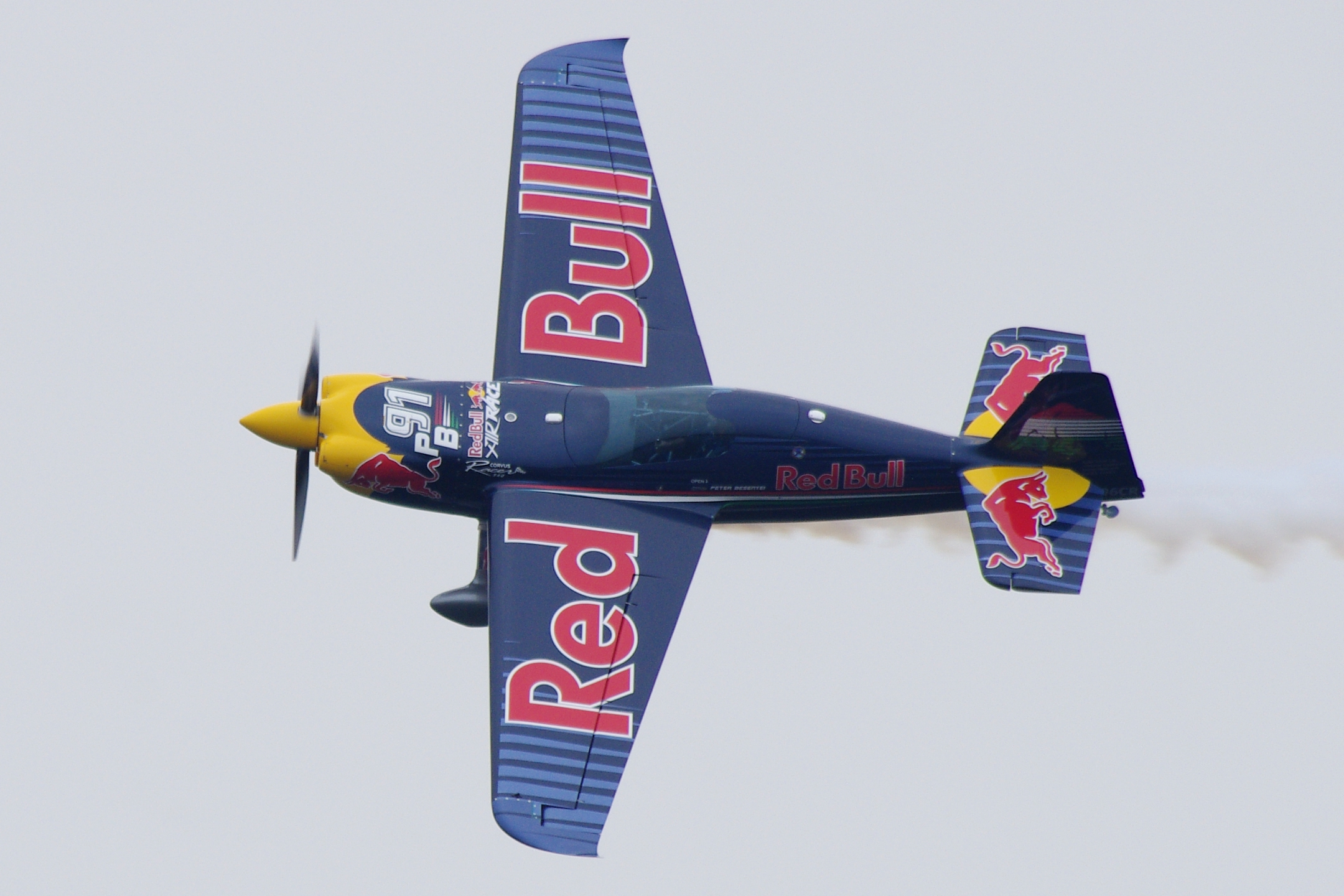
Péter Besenyei – winner of the inaugural series in 2003 – during the Chiba leg of the 2015 championship

The Red Bull Air Race World Championship (formerly known as the Red Bull Air Race), established in 2003 and created by Red Bull GmbH, was an international series of air races in which entrants compete to navigate a challenging obstacle course in the fastest time. Pilots flew individually against the clock and were required to complete tight turns through a slalom course consisting of inflatable pylons, known as "Air Gates". The races were held mainly over water near cities, but were also held at airfields or natural wonders (such as Sugarloaf Mountain and Monument Valley). Races were usually flown on weekends with the first day for qualification then knockout finals the day after. The events attracted large crowds and are broadcast, both live and in highlights, in many nations. At each venue, the top ten places earned World Championship points. The air racer with the most points at the end of the Championship became Red Bull Air Race World Champion. After a three-year hiatus from 2011 for safety improvements and reorganisation, the Air Race resumed in 2014.

The inaugural series comprising two races was won by the Hungarian pilot Péter Besenyei who went on to secure second place the following three series. The most successful pilot in the history of the championship is Briton Paul Bonhomme who won the title on three occasions, in 2009, 2010 and 2015. British and American pilots are the most successful, with four titles for each nationality. The championship was cancelled after the 2019 event.

== History ==
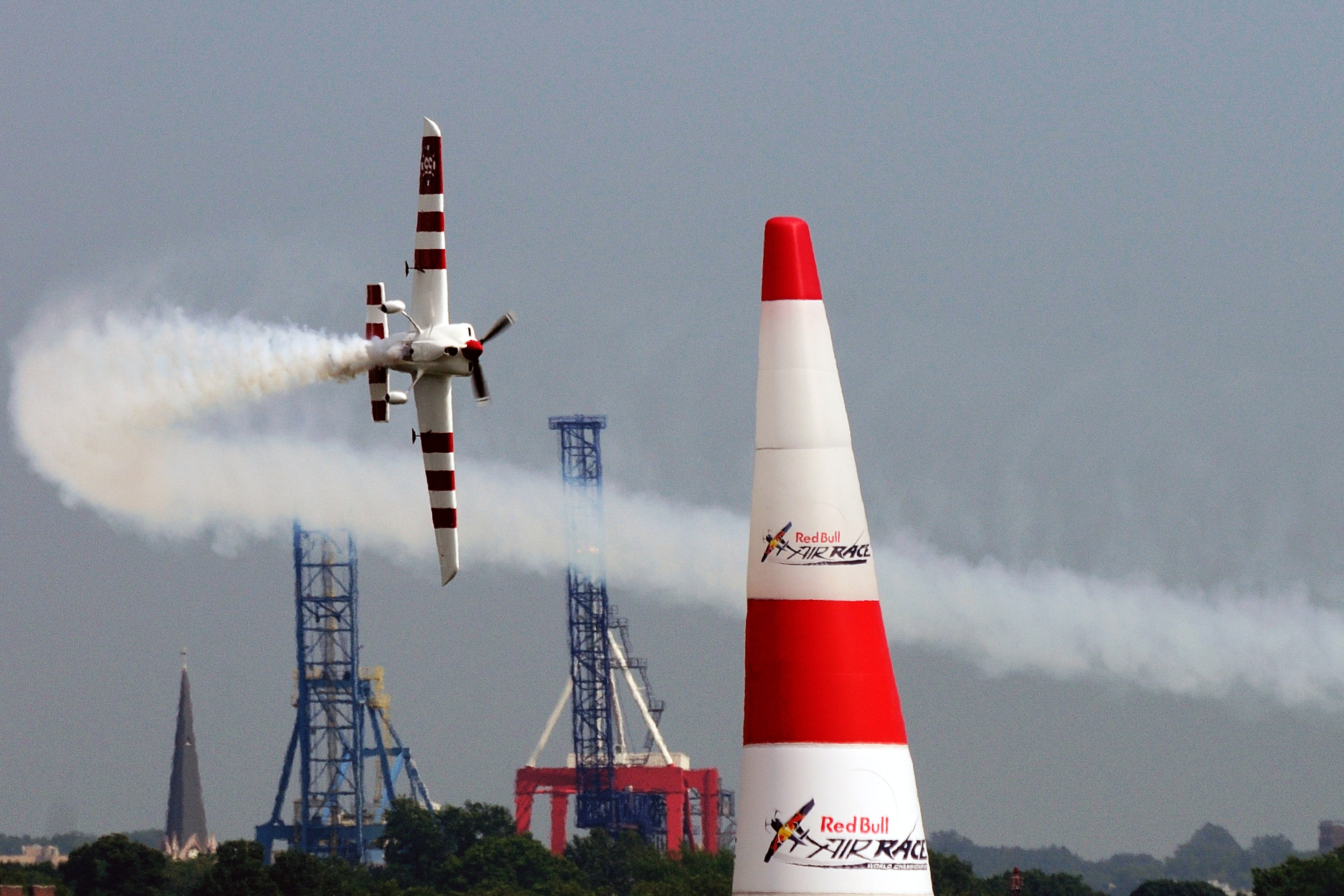
Paul Bonhomme – winner of the championship in 2009, 2010 and 2015 – during the New York leg of the 2010 series

The inaugural series in 2003, which consisted of two races, one in Austria and one in Hungary, was won by the Hungarian pilot Péter Besenyei, with the German Klaus Schrodt coming second, followed by the American Kirby Chambliss. The format was expanded the following year to encompass three venues, the United States, the United Kingdom and Austria, and was won by Chambliss. The 2005 series expanded the competition to seven races, of which American pilot Mike Mangold won five to secure the title. The 2006 series included eight. Chambliss won four races against ten other pilots to win his second title in three years. The following series included ten venues with thirteen competitors, and ended with Mangold winning his second title, ahead of British pilot Paul Bonhomme and Besenyei.

In the 2008 series, Austrian qualifier Hannes Arch took the title on his first attempt in a championship featuring eight rounds. Bonhomme finished second and Chambliss took third place. The 2009 series featured fifteen pilots but at fewer venues, six in total. The previous year's runner-up Bonhomme took the title, winning three races and placing second in the other three. Arch was second and Australian newcomer Matt Hall came third. Bonhomme defended his title in the 2010 series, placing in the top three in each race of a six-race season. Arch came second again, and British pilot Nigel Lamb finished third.

No Red Bull Air Race series took place between 2011 and 2013 inclusively, during which time new safety measures and standardised engines were introduced. The 2014 series was the first to divide the field into classes, namely the "Master Class", and the "Challenger Class" in which young pilots compete. The title was taken by Lamb, followed by Arch and Bonhomme. The following series took place across eight venues and was won by Bonhomme, followed by Hall and Arch. In 2016, the Red Bull Air Race season was held at seven locations, with the German pilot Matthias Dolderer winning his first title. Hall finished second and Arch placed posthumously third, having died in an unrelated helicopter accident before the end of the championship. The 2017 Red Bull Air Race World Championship was won by the Japanese pilot Yoshihide Muroya, with Czech pilot Martin Šonka second and Canadian Pete McLeod third. Šonka went one better the following year, winning the title ahead of Matt Hall and Michael Goulian.

== Winners and runners-up ==
Key
†	Indicates posthumous placing

Series	Image	Winner		Second place		Third place		Ref(s)
Series	Image	Name	Nationality	Name	Nationality	Name	Nationality	Ref(s)
2003	Peter Besenyei	Péter Besenyei	HUN	Klaus Schrodt	GER	Kirby Chambliss	USA	
2004	Kirby Chambliss in 2010	Kirby Chambliss	USA	Péter Besenyei	HUN	Steve Jones	GBR	
2004	Kirby Chambliss in 2010	Kirby Chambliss	USA	Péter Besenyei	HUN	Klaus Schrodt	GER	
2005	Mike Mangold in 2007	Mike Mangold	USA	Péter Besenyei	HUN	Kirby Chambliss	USA	
2006	Kirby Chambliss in 2010	Kirby Chambliss	USA	Péter Besenyei	HUN	Mike Mangold	USA	
2007	Mike Mangold in 2007	Mike Mangold	USA	Paul Bonhomme	GBR	Péter Besenyei	HUN	
2008	Hannes Arch	Hannes Arch	AUT	Paul Bonhomme	GBR	Kirby Chambliss	USA	
2009	Paul Bonhomme	Paul Bonhomme	GBR	Hannes Arch	AUT	Matt Hall	AUS	
2010	Paul Bonhomme	Paul Bonhomme	GBR	Hannes Arch	AUT	Nigel Lamb	GBR	
2011	No event							
2012	No event							
2013	No event							
2014	Nigel Lamb	Nigel Lamb	GBR	Hannes Arch	AUT	Paul Bonhomme	GBR	
2015	Paul Bonhomme	Paul Bonhomme	GBR	Matt Hall	AUS	Hannes Arch	AUT	
2016	Matthias Dolderer	Matthias Dolderer	GER	Matt Hall	AUS	Hannes Arch †	AUT	
2017	Yoshihide Muroya	Yoshihide Muroya	JPN	Martin Šonka	CZE	Pete McLeod	CAN	
2018	Martin Šonka	Martin Šonka	CZE	Matt Hall	AUS	Michael Goulian	USA	
2019		Matt Hall	AUS	Yoshihide Muroya	JPN	Martin Šonka	CZE	
