= 2005 Red Bull Air Race World Series =

Seasons
- ← 2004 2006 →

The 2005 Red Bull Air Race World Series was the third Red Bull Air Race World Series season. It began on April 8, 2005 and ended on October 8.

In the 2005 season, the RAF Kemble in the United Kingdom was replaced by Longleat and Reno, Nevada in the United States with San Francisco, California. The number of race locations grew from three to seven by adding Abu Dhabi in the United Arab Emirates, Rotterdam in the Netherlands, Zeltweg in Austria and Rock of Cashel in Ireland.

The previous year's competitors from the USA, Michael Goulian and Martin David, did not participate in the 2005 season. British Nigel Lamb joined the Red Bull Air Race from the Longleat leg onwards. American pilot Mike Mangold, won five of the seven races, became champion in 2005 with a total of 36 points followed by Hungarian Péter Besenyei (32 points). Kirby Chambliss from the United States, ranked on third place with 21 points.

== Race calendar ==
2005 Red Bull Air Race World Series Race Calendar
Leg	Date	Place	Country
1	April 8	Port of Mina' Zayid, Abu Dhabi	United Arab Emirates
2	June 12	Erasmusbrug, Rotterdam	The Netherlands
3	June 25	Zeltweg Air Base	Austria
4	July 24	Rock of Cashel	(Republic of Ireland) Ireland
5	August 7	Longleat, Wiltshire	United Kingdom
6	August 20	River Danube, Budapest	Hungary
7	October 8	Marina Green and Aquatic Park, San Francisco, California	United States

== Standings and results ==
2005 Red Bull Air Race World Series Standings and Results
Rank	Pilot	UAE (United Arab Emirates)	NED (Netherlands)	AUT (Austria)	IRL (Republic of Ireland)	GBR (United Kingdom)	HUN (Hungary)	United States	Total Points
1	Mike Mangold	3	1	1	5	1	1	1	36
2	Péter Besenyei	1	2	2	1	3	4	4	32
3	Kirby Chambliss	9	4	4	DNS	2	2	2	21
4	Klaus Schrodt	5	3	7	4	4	5	3	18
5	Paul Bonhomme	6	7	3	3	5	3	5	17
6	Steve Jones	2	5	5	6	6	6	9	12
7	Nicolas Ivanoff	4	6	6	2	7	7	6	11
8=	Frank Versteegh	8	8	8	7	8	DNS	8	0
8=	Alejandro Maclean	7	9	9	TP	10	9	10	0
8=	Nigel Lamb	DNP	DNP	DNP	DNP	9	8	7	0

Legend:

- DNP: Did not participate
- DNS: Did not show
- TP: Technical problems

== Aircraft ==
2005 Red Bull Air Race World Series Aircraft
Aircraft	Constructor	Pilot
CAP-232	CAP Aviation	Nicolas Ivanoff
Extra 230	Extra Flugzeugbau	Nicolas Ivanoff
Extra 300L	Extra Flugzeugbau	Nigel Lamb; Alejandro Maclean; Frank Versteegh
Extra 300S	Extra Flugzeugbau	Péter Besenyei; Paul Bonhomme; Steve Jones; Klaus Schrodt
Sukhoi Su-26	Sukhoi Corporation	Alejandro Maclean
Sukhoi Su-31	Sukhoi Corporation	Alejandro Maclean
Zivko Edge 540	Zivko Aeronautics	Kirby Chambliss; Mike Mangold
