= 2004 Red Bull Air Race World Series =

Seasons
- ← 2003 2005 →

The 2004 Red Bull Air Race World Series was the second Red Bull Air Race World Series season. It debuted on June 20, 2004 and ended on September 18.

In the 2004 season, the number of Air Race venues increased from two to three locations. The leg in Zeltweg Austria was removed and RAF Kemble (now called Cotswold Airport) in the United Kingdom became the season opener. Reno, Nevada in the United States was also added to the calendar. And the race in Budapest moved away from Tokol Airport, to the Danube, creating the first race over water.

In addition to the previous year's competitors, three pilots from the USA, Mike Mangold, Michael Goulian and David Martin, a Dutch pilot Frank Versteegh and Nicolas Ivanoff of France took part at the Air Races in 2004. American Kirby Chambliss, became champion in 2004 with a total of 17 points winning two of the three races, followed by Hungarian Péter Besenyei (12 points), who won both races in 2003. British pilot Steve Jones and German aviator Klaus Schrodt shared the 3rd place with eight points.

== Race calendar ==
2004 Red Bull Air Race World Series Race Calendar
Leg	Date	Place	Country
1	June 20	RAF Kemble	United Kingdom
2	August 20	River Danube, Budapest	Hungary
3	September 18	Reno, Nevada	United States

== Standings and results ==
2004 Red Bull Air Race World Series Standings and Results
Rank	Pilot	GBR (United Kingdom)	HUN (Hungary)	United States	Total Points
1	Kirby Chambliss	1	1	2	17
2	Péter Besenyei	3	3	3	12
3	Steve Jones	2	4	7	8
3=	Klaus Schrodt	4	2	DNS	8
5	Mike Mangold	DNP	DNP	1	6
6	Frank Versteegh	5	6	DNS	3
6=	Michael Goulian	DNP	DNP	4	3
8	Paul Bonhomme	6	7	6	2
8=	Nicolas Ivanoff	DNP	5	DNS	2
8=	David Martin	DNP	DNP	5	2
11	Alejandro Maclean	DNP	8	DNS	0

Legend:

- DNP: Did not participate
- DNS: Did not show

== Aircraft ==
2004 Red Bull Air Race World Series Aircraft
Aircraft	Constructor	Pilot
Extra 230	Extra Flugzeugbau	Nicolas Ivanoff
Extra 300L	Extra Flugzeugbau	Frank Versteegh
Extra 300S	Extra Flugzeugbau	Péter Besenyei; Paul Bonhomme; Steve Jones; Klaus Schrodt
Sukhoi Su-26	Sukhoi Corporation	Alejandro Maclean
Zivko Edge 540	Zivko Aeronautics	Kirby Chambliss; Mike Mangold
