= Frank Versteegh =

Dutch aerobatics pilot

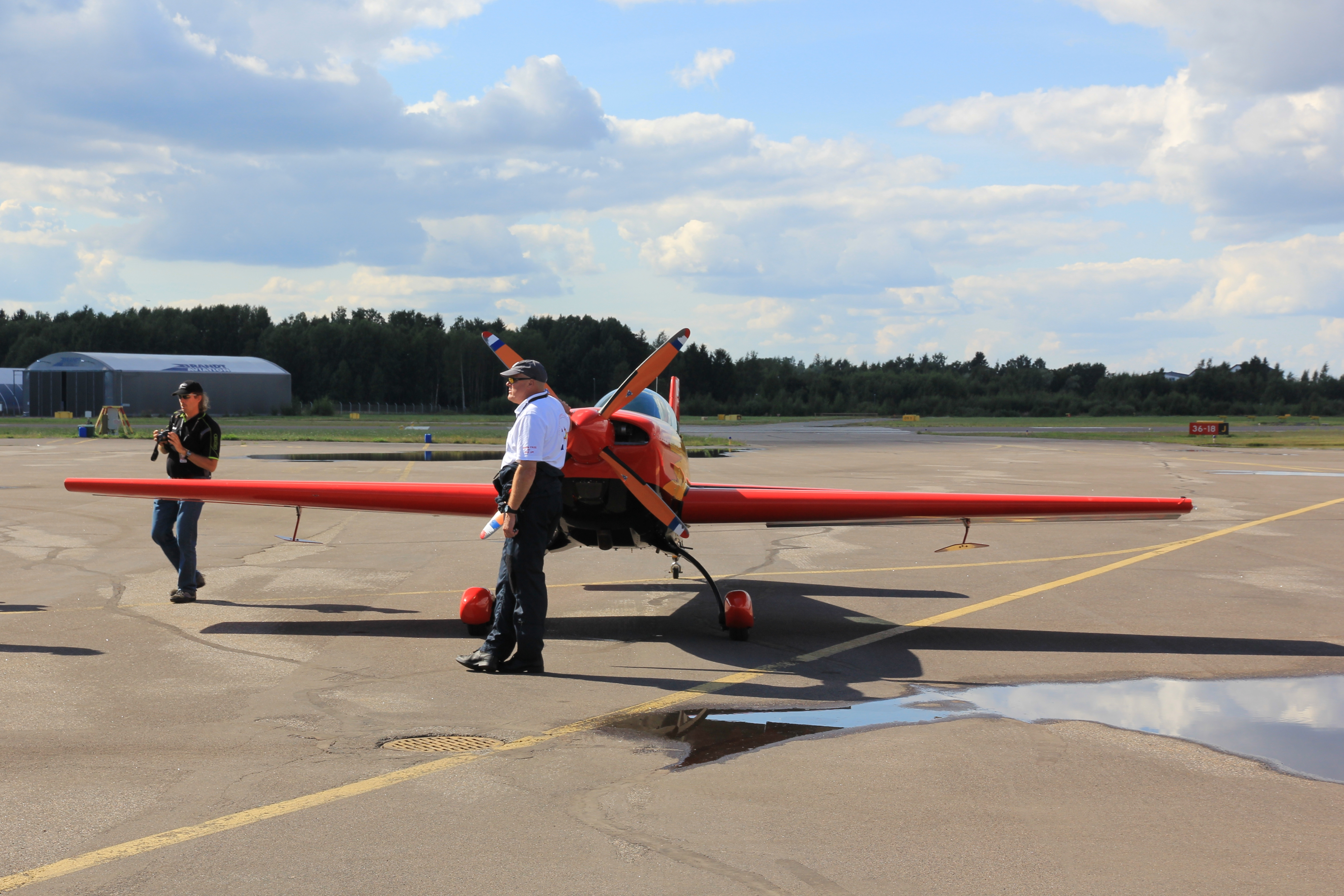
- Frank Versteegh with his Extra 300L aircraft at Helsinki-Malmi airport
- Born: September 19, 1954 (age 72); Oosterbeek, Netherlands
- Aviation career

Racing career
- First race: 2003
- Best position: 6th (2004)
- Aircraft: Zivko Edge 540
- Website: aerobatics.nl

Frank Versteegh (born 19 September 1954) is a Dutch aerobatics pilot. He is also an airshow organiser, a flight safety committee member, a FAI judge and a freestyle aerobatics competitor.

Versteegh was born in Oosterbeek, the Netherlands and started his flying career in 1972 at the age of 18. Between 1982 and 1994, he competed in European and World Championships. During his career, he flew in over 1,250 aerobatic displays at major aviation events all over the world, using over 160 different types of aircraft.

He flew his first display in a Cessna 150 aerobat in 1983. Between 1987 and 1989, he flew in the Pitts S-2S G-SOLO, which also flew in the Rothmanns team as a solo aircraft. In 1989, the Pitts was sold to a German buyer. He flew back in a newly acquired Zlin 50 LS which had been Manfred Strossenreuther's prior to his death near Teuge in the Netherlands. In this aircraft, Versteegh won the Open Dutch National Unlimited Aerobatic Championship in that same year.

His sponsor "Shake 20" made it possible to purchase his new Extra 300, a mid-wing composite mono-plane. Versteegh flew three years in this plane under a Shake 20 license, but changed to a new sponsor "Volny" in 1995. During 1996, Volny made it possible to purchase his current airplane, the Extra 300L. In July 1997, he was the first pilot ever to make a touch and go in an Extra 300L (D-EZOZ) on a 70-meter-long river freighter. He performed the feat on the Rhine at Rhenen in his home country. The stunt took place during an airshow which was attended by 50,000 spectators.

After participating in the FAI World Cup of Aerobatics for three years, he specialized in freestyle aerobatics and skydancing. Currently, Versteegh is one of the selected pilots in the Red Bull Air Race World Series, already participating since the event started in 2003. He was, however, unable to score any points in the 2005 and 2006 series finishing in 8th and 11th position.

Versteegh has a Jack Russell Terrier called "Joe the Co", who is known as his mascot. Joe the Co was born on 12 July 1996 and has been flying alongside Versteegh in the Extra 300L, the Bücker "Jungmann", Robinson R44, A-26 Invader and many other aircraft. The dog joins Versteegh in most of his airshows.

== Competitions and tournaments ==
1982–1994

- Dutch Aerobatic Champion

1985

- South African Masters La Mercy, Durban, South Africa

1987

- Eurobatics Speichersdorf, Germany

1989

- Masters Palaborwa, South Africa
- Eurobatics Becescaba, Hungary

1990

- Masters Ocaña, Spain
- World Championship, Yverdon, Switzerland

1991

- International Masters of Aerobatics, Argentina
- Eurobatics, Toulouse, France

1992

- World Championship, Le Havre, France

1993

Contest director World Glider Aerobatic Championship, Venlo, Netherlands

- Breitling World Cup of Aerobatics

1998

- Freestyle Cup Sassuolo, Italy (Winner of the Reggiani Freestyle Cup)

2000

- Freestyle Cup Milano Bresso, Italy (Silver medal)

2002

- Italian Free Style Championship Sassuolo (Second position)

2003

- Melilla Masters, Spain and Morocco
- Italy Reggiani Trophy (Fourth position)

2006

- Italian Freestyle championships (First position)

(Netherlands) Frank Versteegh at the Red Bull Air Race World Series
| Year | 1 | 2 | 3 | 4 | 5 | 6 | 7 | 8 | 9 | 10 | 11 | 12 | Points | Wins | Rank |
|---|---|---|---|---|---|---|---|---|---|---|---|---|---|---|---|
| 2004 | (United Kingdom); 5th | (Hungary); 6th | (United States); DNS | | | | | | | | | | 3 | 0 | 6th |
| 2005 | (United Arab Emirates); 8th | (Netherlands); 8th | (Austria); 8th | (Republic of Ireland); 7th | (United Kingdom); 8th | (Hungary); DNS | (United States); 8th | | | | | | 0 | 0 | 8th |
| 2006 | (United Arab Emirates); 10th | (Spain); 11th | (Germany); 10th | (Russia); CAN | (Turkey); 10th | (Hungary); DQ | (United Kingdom); 10th | (United States); DQ | (Australia); 11th | | | | 0 | 0 | 11th |
| 2007 | (United Arab Emirates); 6th | (Brazil); 10th | (United States); 6th | (Turkey); 6th | (Spain); CAN | (Switzerland); 9th | (United Kingdom); 8th | (Hungary); 8th | (Portugal); 11th | (United States); 12th | (Mexico); CAN | (Australia); 12th | 3 | 0 | 11th |

Legend:

- CAN: Cancelled
- DNP: Did not participate
- DNS: Did not show
- DQ: Disqualified
- NC: Not classified

== See also ==
- Competition aerobatics
