= Alejandro Maclean =

Spanish air racer (1969–2010)

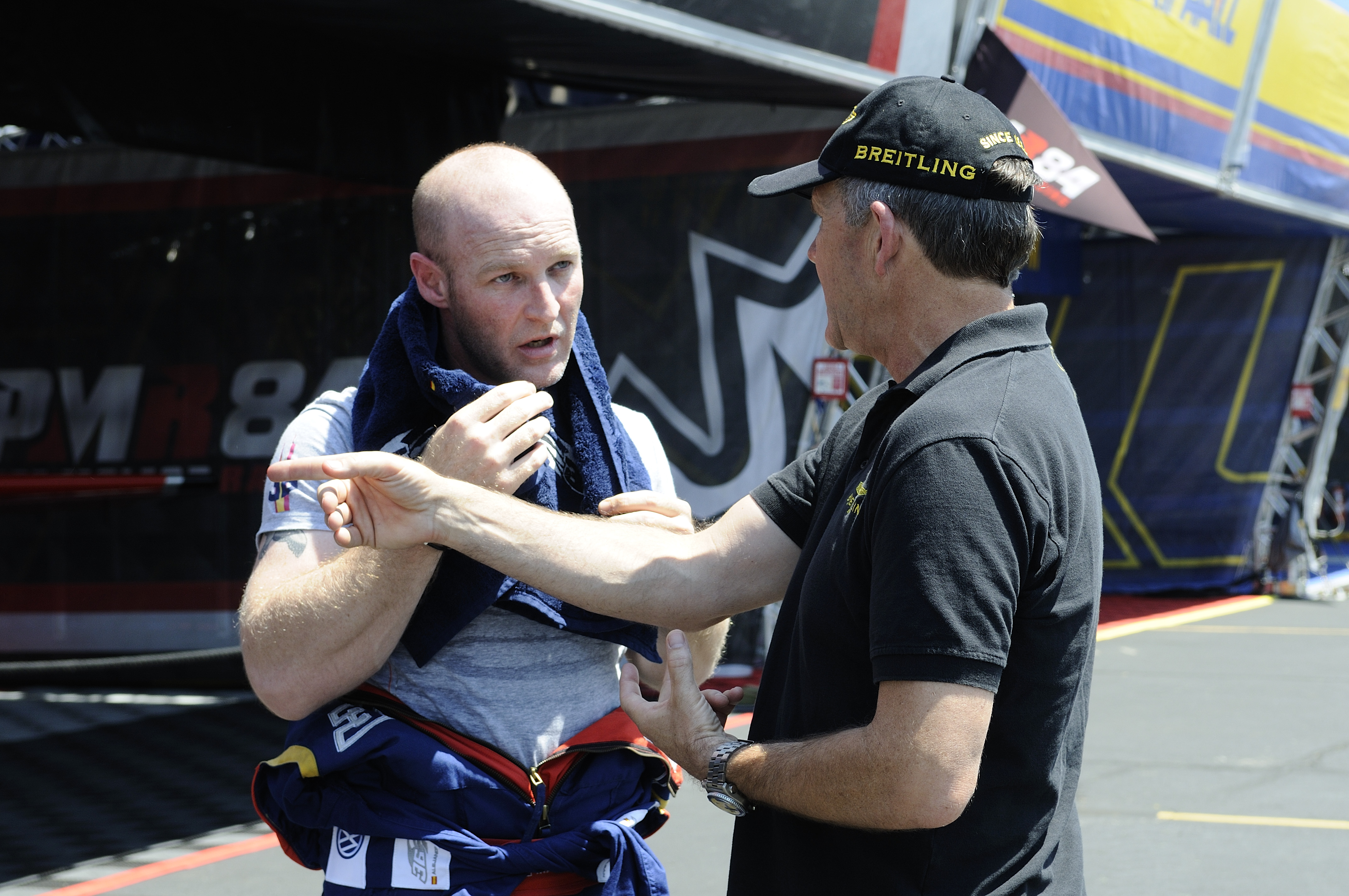
- Maclean with Nigel Lamb
- Born: 6 August 1969
- Died: 17 August 2010 (aged 41); Casarrubios del Monte, Spain
- Aviation career

Racing career
- First race: 2003
- Best position: 6th (2007)
- Aircraft: MXS-R
- Website: maclean.es

Alejandro "Álex" Maclean (6 August 1969 – 17 August 2010) was a Spanish TV film producer and aerobatics pilot, who competed in the Red Bull Air Race World Championship under the number 36. Maclean was nicknamed "The Flying Matador".

Maclean, whose grandfather was Scottish and hence his family name, was fascinated by airplanes as a child. So, he built and collected model airplanes, and later stepped up to remote controlled planes. At the age of 18, he bought his own Ultralight. Soon, he began to try out some basic manoeuvres in his new plane. The aerobatics resulted in his first accident. Maclean later experienced two more serious air accidents during aerobatics flights.

In 2005 Maclean became captain of the Spanish aerobatics team.

He had a partnership in a TV film production company, enjoyed skydiving, flying helicopters, horse-riding and waterskiing. Maclean was married to Emma. The couple has two sons Alejandro and Eduardo.

He died on 17 August 2010, when his plane crashed into the ground, while performing a manoeuvre during a training exercise in Casarrubios del Monte, Spain.

== Achievements ==
- European champion in unlimited aerobatics
- The winner of 1998 Lithuanian Open Aerobatic Championship
- Two-time Spanish aerobatics champion

(Spain) Alejandro Maclean at the Red Bull Air Race World Championship
Year	1	2	3	4	5	6	7	8	9	10	11	12	Points	Wins	Rank
2003	(Austria); NC	(Hungary); DNS											0	0	NC
2004	(United Kingdom); DNP	(Hungary); 8th	(United States); DNS										0	0	11th
2005	(United Arab Emirates); 7th	(Netherlands); 9th	(Austria); 9th	(Republic of Ireland); TP	(United Kingdom); 10th	(Hungary); 9th	(United States); 10th						0	0	8th
2006	(United Arab Emirates); 4th	(Spain); 7th	(Germany); DNS	(Russia); CAN	(Turkey); 7th	(Hungary); 8th	(United Kingdom); 7th	(United States); DQ	(Australia); 7th				3	0	9th
2007	(United Arab Emirates); 7th	(Brazil); 2nd	(United States); 5th	(Turkey); 4th	(Spain); CAN	(Switzerland); 7th	(United Kingdom); 4th	(Hungary); 7th	(Portugal); 8th	(United States); 8th	(Mexico); CAN	(Australia); 4th	16	0	6th
2008	(United Arab Emirates); 6th	(United States); 7th	(United States); 9th	(Sweden); CAN	(Netherlands); 10th	(United Kingdom); 8th	(Hungary); 7th	(Portugal); 8th	(Spain); CAN	(Australia); 4th			21	0	8th
2009	(United Arab Emirates); 8th	(United States); 10th	(Canada); 10th	(Hungary); 11th	(Portugal); 7th	(Spain); 10th							16	0	12th
2010	(United Arab Emirates); 12th	(Australia); 13th	(Brazil); 9th	(Canada); 11th	(United States); 9th	(Germany); 10th	(Hungary); CAN	(Portugal); CAN					9	0	11th

Legend:

- CAN: Cancelled
- DNP: Did not participate
- DNS: Did not show
- DQ: Disqualified
- NC: Not classified
- TP:Technical Problems

== See also ==
- Competition aerobatics
