= Steve Jones (aviator) =

British pilot (born 1960)

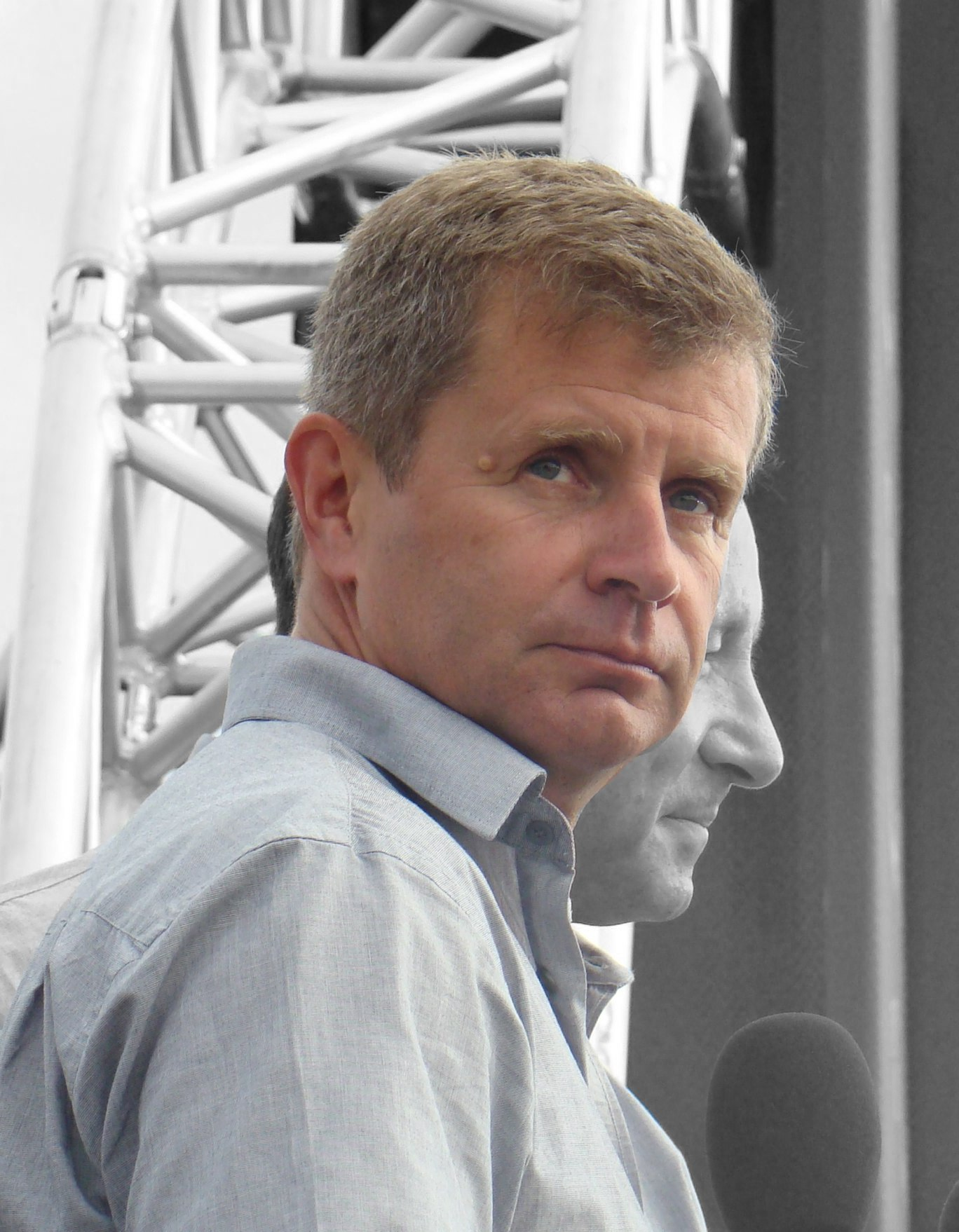
- Steve Jones in 2010
- Born: 5 January 1960 (age 66)
- Aviation career

Racing career
- First race: 2004
- Best position: 3rd (2004)
- Aircraft: Zivko Edge 540
- Website: Profile at air-races.com

Steve Jones (born 5 January 1960) is a British airline and aerobatics pilot who competed in the Red Bull Air Race World Series, flying a Zivko Edge 540. He is now the championship's head judge.

Jones had his first flying lesson at just five years old, in 1965, in a Cessna, on the knee of a family friend. He became a pilot both commercially and competitively.

Commercially, Jones was formerly a captain for British Airways, flying a Boeing 747. He spends his off-season working on and racing vintage cars. His company is also rebuilding two vintage wooden racing aircraft.

Since 1994, Jones has flown competitively and as a display pilot with Paul Bonhomme in their Red Bull Matadors Team. They have taken their show around the world from the UAE to Japan. Jones flies as the wingman. Jones was a competitive Red Bull Air Race pilot from the first UK race which took place in Kemble UK in 2004. In the Red Bull Air Race series of 2007, he won in Porto, Portugal, defeating Mike Mangold.

Jones retired from Airrace as a competitor at the end of the 2008 season. He spent the next two seasons as technical commentator for TV and Internet coverage.

Red Bull Air Race took a 3-year break, returning in 2014. Jones came back as race director and head of training.

On 16 November 2021 Steve Jones became the record holder for electrically powered planes over a 3km course, with a speed of 559.9km/h (345.4mph) in the Spirit of innovation, built for Rolls Royce buy the now defunct Electroflight.

Jones is not to be confused with Steve Jones, glider pilot, who was winner of the 2001 and 2014 World Gliding Championships.

== 1995 British Aerobatics Champion ==
- 1995 UK Freestyle Aerobatics Champion
- FAI WGP Championships – three 1st place medals, one 2nd place medal
- All FAI WGP results in the formation team category as the Sukhoi Duo/Matadors

== Flying achievements ==
- 2000 FAI World Grand Prix, Gold Medal, Japan
- 2001 FAI WGP, Silver, Japan
- 2002 FAI WGP, Silver, Czech Republic; Gold, Japan
- 2004 FAI WGP, Gold, U.A.E.
- 2005 FAI WGP, Gold, Switzerland
- 2005 FAI WGP, Bronze, U.A.E.; Gold, Switzerland

Steve Jones at the Red Bull Air Race World Series
Year	1	2	3	4	5	6	7	8	9	10	11	12	Points	Wins	Rank
2003	(Austria); NC	(Hungary); DNS											0	0	NC
2004	(United Kingdom); 2nd	(Hungary); 4th	(United States); 7th										8	0	3rd
2005	(United Arab Emirates); 2nd	(Netherlands); 5th	(Austria); 5th	(Republic of Ireland); 6th	(United Kingdom); 6th	(Hungary); 6th	(United States); 9th						12	0	6th
2006	(United Arab Emirates); 8th	(Spain); 10th	(Germany); 7th	(Russia); CAN	(Turkey); 8th	(Hungary); 1st	(United Kingdom); DQ	(United States); DQ	(Australia); 5th				8	0	6th
2007	(United Arab Emirates); 5th	(Brazil); 8th	(United States); 7th	(Turkey); 12th	(Spain); CAN	(Switzerland); 4th	(United Kingdom); 6th	(Hungary); 5th	(Portugal); 1st	(United States); 4th	(Mexico); CAN	(Australia); 10th	17	0	5th
2008	(United Arab Emirates); 7th	(United States); 9th	(United States); 7th	(Netherlands); 3rd	(United Kingdom); 9th	(Hungary); 2nd	(Portugal); 4th	(Spain); CAN	(Australia); 6th				33	0	6th

Legend:

- CAN: Cancelled
- DNP: Did not participate
- DNS: Did not show
- DQ: Disqualified
- NC: Not classified

== See also ==
- Competition aerobatics
