= 2006 Red Bull Air Race World Series =

Seasons
- ← 2005 2007 →

The 2006 Red Bull Air Race World Championship was the fourth Red Bull Air Race season and second as a World Championship. It began on March 18, 2006, and ended on November 19.

In the 2006 season Rotterdam in the Netherlands, Zeltweg in Austria, and Rock of Cashel in Ireland were removed from the calendar. The number of races increased from seven to nine. The new places were Barcelona in Spain, Berlin in Germany, Saint Petersburg in Russia, Istanbul in Turkey and Perth in Australia. Only eight of the races were held after the cancellation of the 4th leg in Saint Petersburg. The race in Longleat, United Kingdom was also cancelled due to high winds, however, Friday's Qualifying results were used as the official race results.

Michael Goulian from the US, who had paused in 2005, returned in 2006 to compete again as the 11th pilot. The American pilot Kirby Chambliss, took four wins and became World Champion with a total of 38 points followed by Hungarian Péter Besenyei (35 points). 2005 World Champion Mike Mangold from the United States, finished third with 30 points.

== Race calendar ==
2006 Red Bull Air Race World Series Race Calendar
Leg	Date	Place	Country
1	March 18	Port of Mina' Zayid, Abu Dhabi	United Arab Emirates
2	May 6	Beaches of Bogatell and Nova Icària, Barcelona	Spain
3	May 27	Tempelhof International Airport, Berlin	Germany
4	June 17	River Neva, Saint Petersburg	Russia
5	July 29	Golden Horn, Istanbul	Turkey
6	August 20	River Danube, Budapest	Hungary
7	September 2	Longleat, Wiltshire	United Kingdom
8	October 7	Marina Green and Aquatic Park, San Francisco, California	United States
9	November 19	Swan River, Perth	Australia

== Standings and results ==
2006 Red Bull Air Race World Series Standings and Results
Rank	Pilot	UAE (United Arab Emirates)	ESP (Spain)	GER (Germany)	RUS (Russia)	TUR (Turkey)	HUN (Hungary)	GBR (United Kingdom)	USA (United States)	AUS (Australia)	Total Points
1	Kirby Chambliss	1	3	1	CAN	1	5	3	1	3	38
2	Péter Besenyei	3	1	2	CAN	3	DQ	2	2	1	35
3	Mike Mangold	2	2	3	CAN	4	3	4	4	4	30
4	Paul Bonhomme	7	8	6	CAN	2	2	1	3	2	26
5	Michael Goulian	6	9	5	CAN	DNS	4	5	5	6	11
6	Steve Jones	8	10	7	CAN	8	1	DQ	DQ	5	8
7	Klaus Schrodt	DQ	4	4	CAN	9	7	8	6	10	7
7=	Nicolas Ivanoff	5	5	9	CAN	5	6	9	9	9	7
9	Alejandro Maclean	4	7	DNS	CAN	7	8	7	DQ	7	3
9=	Nigel Lamb	9	6	8	CAN	6	DQ	6	8	8	3
11	Frank Versteegh	10	11	10	CAN	10	DQ	10	DQ	11	0

Legend:

- CAN: Cancelled
- DQ: Disqualified
- DNS: Did not show

== Aircraft ==
2006 Red Bull Air Race World Series Aircraft
Aircraft	Constructor	Pilot
Extra 300L	Extra Flugzeugbau	Frank Versteegh
Extra 300S	Extra Flugzeugbau	Péter Besenyei; Paul Bonhomme; Nicolas Ivanoff; Nigel Lamb; Klaus Schrodt
MX2	MXR Technologies	Michael Goulian (Race Abu Dhabi only); Nigel Lamb (Race San Francisco only); Frank Versteegh (Race San Francisco only)
Velox Revolution 1	Velox Aviation	Péter Besenyei (Training Abu Dhabi only)
Zivko Edge 540	Zivko Aeronautics	Péter Besenyei; Paul Bonhomme; Kirby Chambliss; Steve Jones; Alejandro Maclean; Mike Mangold
