= 2007 Red Bull Air Race World Series =

Seasons
- ← 2006 2008 →

The 2007 Red Bull Air Race World Series was the fifth Red Bull Air Race World Series season.

== New pilots ==
Sergey Rakhmanin of Russia and Austrian Hannes Arch were chosen to join the 2007 series after completing a qualification course in October 2006, held in Arizona, United States. This takes the number of pilots to 13.

== Race calendar ==
Three locations more were added to the race calendar in 2007, extending the number of rounds from 9 to 12. However, only 10 races were run due to cancellation of the legs in Barcelona, Spain and Acapulco, Mexico. The first race was held on April 6 in Abu Dhabi, United Arab Emirates and the last one was on November 3 in Perth, Australia.

2007 Red Bull Air Race World Series Race Calendar
Leg	Date	Place	Country
1	April 6	Port of Mina' Zayid, Abu Dhabi	United Arab Emirates
2	April 21	Enseada de Botafogo, Rio de Janeiro	Brazil
3	May 12	Monument Valley, Arizona	United States of America
4	June 2	Golden Horn, Istanbul	Turkey
5	July 15	Interlaken, Bern	Switzerland
6	July 29	River Thames, London	United Kingdom
7	August 20	River Danube, Budapest	Hungary
8	September 1	River Douro, Porto	Portugal
9	September 22	San Diego, California	United States of America
10	November 3	Swan River, Perth	Australia

== Standings and results ==
2007 Red Bull Air Race World Series Standings and Results
Rank	Pilot	UAE (United Arab Emirates)	BRA (Brazil)	United States	TUR (Turkey)	SUI (Switzerland)	GBR (United Kingdom)	HUN (Hungary)	POR (Portugal)	United States	AUS (Australia)	Total Points
1	Mike Mangold	2	3	3	1	2	1	1	2	5	3	47
2	Paul Bonhomme	3	1	2	2	1	2	3	3	1	5	47
3	Péter Besenyei	1	5	1	5	3	3	4	4	6	7	31
4	Kirby Chambliss	4	6	4	3	5	5	2	5	2	6	28
5	Steve Jones	5	8	7	12	4	6	5	1	4	10	17
6	Alejandro Maclean	7	2	5	4	7	4	7	8	8	4	16
7	Nicolas Ivanoff	9	11	12	13	8	9	12	6	7	1	7
8	Michael Goulian	7	DNS	11	7	6	DNS	9	9	9	2	6
9	Nigel Lamb	11	7	8	8	10	7	6	7	3	8	5
10	Hannes Arch	13	4	10	11	12	11	10	12	10	9	3
11	Frank Versteegh	6	10	6	6	9	8	8	11	12	12	3
12	Sergey Rakhmanin	12	9	9	10	13	10	11	10	11	11	0
13	Klaus Schrodt	9	12	13	9	11	12	13	13	13	13	0

Legend:

- DNS: Did not show

Mike Mangold won on countback over Paul Bonhomme. Both pilots had the same number of points, first, second, third and fifth places, resulting in the results of qualification being taken into account.

== Aircraft ==
2007 Red Bull Air Race World Series Aircraft
Aircraft	Pilot
Zivko Edge 540	Hannes Arch; Péter Besenyei; Paul Bonhomme; Kirby Chambliss; Michael Goulian; Steve Jones; Alejandro Maclean; Mike Mangold; Sergey Rakhmanin; Frank Versteegh
MX2	Nigel Lamb
CAP-232	Nicolas Ivanoff
Extra 300SR	Nicolas Ivanoff
Extra 300S	Klaus Schrodt
