= 2003 Red Bull Air Race World Series =

Seasons
- ← none 2004 →

The 2003 Red Bull Air Race World Series was the 1st Red Bull Air Race World Series season. It started on June 28, 2003 and ended on August 20.

In the 2003 season, there were two air race venues only, Zeltweg in Austria and Budapest in Hungary.

Six pilots competed in the first leg. Due to a timing dispute, no points were given. In the second and final round, only three pilots participated. Hungarian Péter Besenyei won the race in Budapest and so the 2003 championship with 6 points. Klaus Schrodt from Germany became second before the American pilot Kirby Chambliss.

== Race calendar ==
2003 Red Bull Air Race World Series Race Calendar
Leg	Date	Place	Country
1	June 28	Zeltweg Air Base	Austria
2	August 20	Tököl Airport, Budapest	Hungary

== Standings and results ==
2003 Red Bull Air Race World Series Standings and Results
Pos.	Pilot	AUT (Austria)	HUN (Hungary)	Points
1	(Hungary) Péter Besenyei	1	1	6
2	(Germany) Klaus Schrodt	NC	2	5
3	(United States) Kirby Chambliss	DNP	3	4
NC	(Lithuania) Jurgis Kairys	2	DNS	0
NC	(United Kingdom) Paul Bonhomme	3	DNS	0
NC	(United Kingdom) Steve Jones	NC	DNS	0
NC	(Spain) Alejandro Maclean	NC	DNS	0

Legend:

- DNP: Did not participate
- DNS: Did not show
- NC: Not classified

== Aircraft ==
2003 Red Bull Air Race World Series Aircraft
Aircraft	Constructor	Pilot
Extra 300L	Extra Flugzeugbau	Péter Besenyei
Extra 300S	Extra Flugzeugbau	Klaus Schrodt
Sukhoi Su-26M	Sukhoi Corporation	Paul Bonhomme; Jurgis Kairys
Sukhoi Su-31	Sukhoi Corporation	Alejandro Maclean; Steve Jones
