= Paul Bonhomme =

British air racer

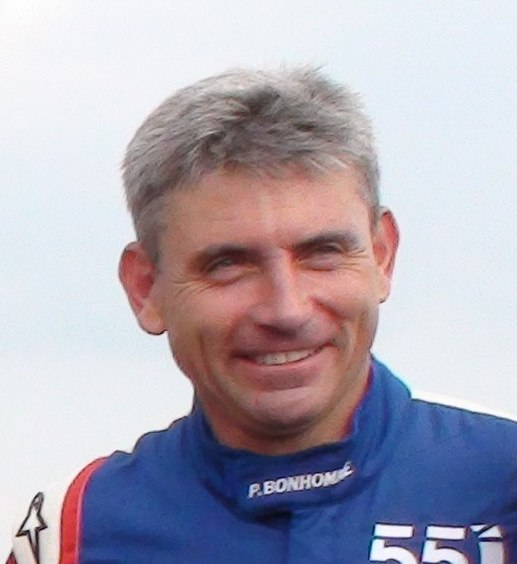
- Born: 22 September 1964 (age 62)
- Aviation career

Racing career
- First race: 2003
- Best position: 1st (2009, 2010 and 2015)
- Aircraft: Zivko Edge 540
- Website: teambonhomme.com https://www.facebook.com/teambonhomme55

Paul Bonhomme (born 22 September 1964) is a British aerobatic and commercial airline pilot and was owner/race pilot of Team Bonhomme, the Red Bull Air Race World Championship Team from 2003 to 2015.

== Racing career ==
Bonhomme was born into a family of aviators. His father was an airline pilot and his mother, who worked mostly as a nurse, did a stint as a stewardess in the late 50's. His brother is also commercial pilot.

Bonhomme's flying career started in 1980 at White Waltham Airfield as a general dogsbody by cleaning hangars, polishing aircraft and refuelling aircraft.

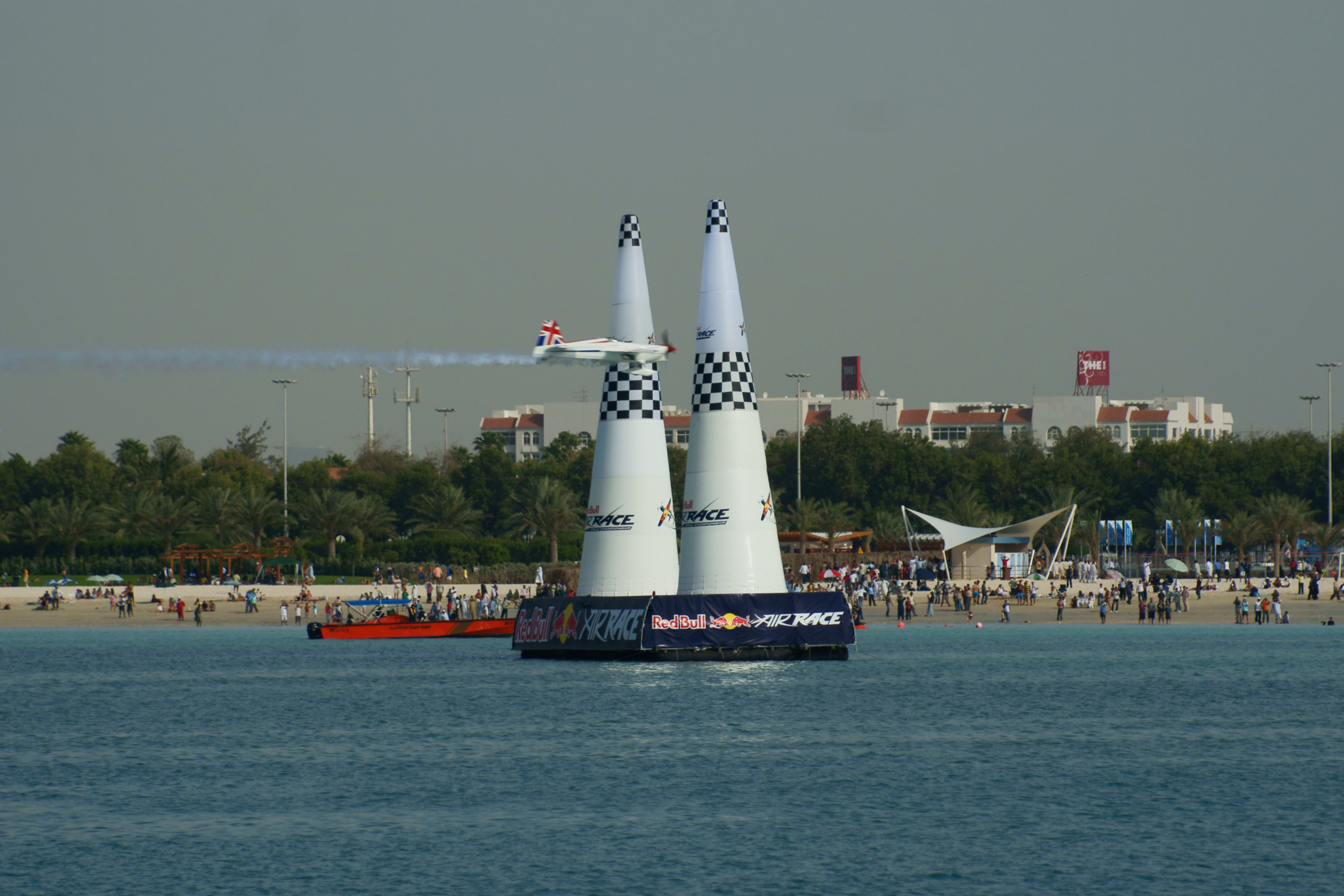
Bonhomme in the 2010 Red Bull Air Race

At age 18 he gained his Private Pilot Licence taking first the FAA licence at Redbird Airfield near Dallas, Texas and subsequently became a flight instructor. In 1985 he became an air taxi pilot and in 1987 joined Air Cymru, a Welsh charter airline, flying the Boeing 737. He now flies as a captain of Boeing 787s for British Airways.

His aerobatics career started in 1986, flying Richard Goode’s Pitts Special, the “Ultimate Pitts”. He went on to fly the Yak-50, Extra 300 and then the Sukhoi Su-26 in 1991 for Richard Goode Aerobatics. He has flown over 1000 public displays and flies vintage fighters for various companies including The Old Flying Machine Company and Aircraft Restoration Company at Duxford Aerodrome and Air Leasing at Sywell.

Aircraft types Bonhomme has flown include the Supermarine Spitfire (MkI, MkV, MkVIII, MkIX, MkIXT, MkXI and MkXIV), Hawker Hurricane, P-40 Kittyhawk, F4F Wildcat, F6F Hellcat, F8F Bearcat, P-47 Thunderbolt, P-63 Kingcobra, Hawker Sea Fury, P-51 Mustang and AD-4 Skyraider.

Starting in 1994 he flew formation displays and competitions around the world with his colleague former Air Race pilot and Television commentator Steve Jones as "The Matadors". They won three gold medals and one silver medal in the FAI series. He has competed in the Red Bull Air Race World Championship from its inception in 2003 until 2015, achieving an unsurpassed record of 46 podium finishes out of 65 races that includes 19 race wins. He was the World Champion in 2009, 2010 and 2015

== Awards ==
In 2010 Paul was awarded the Guild Sword of Honour by the Guild of Air Pilots and Air Navigators.

Bonhomme was the 2009 recipient of the Segrave Trophy.

== Personal life ==
Bonhomme's other activities include helicopter instructing (when he can find time) and his latest and most prized enjoyment is gliding. He glides from the Cambridge Gliding Centre at Gransden Lodge (the third most fantastic gliding airfield in the south of England). He is married with a stepson and three daughters, and lives in South Cambridgeshire, England.

(United Kingdom) Paul Bonhomme at the Red Bull Air Race World Championship
Year	1	2	3	4	5	6	7	8	9	10	11	12	Points	Wins	Rank
2003	(Austria); 3rd	(Hungary); NC											0	0	NC
2004	(United Kingdom); 6th	(Hungary); 7th	(United States); 6th										2	0	8th
2005	(United Arab Emirates); 6th	(Netherlands); 7th	(Austria); 3rd	(Republic of Ireland); 3rd	(United Kingdom); 5th	(Hungary); 3rd	(United States); 5th						17	0	5th
2006	(United Arab Emirates); 7th	(Spain); 8th	(Germany); 6th	(Russia); CAN	(Turkey); 2nd	(Hungary); 2nd	(United Kingdom); 1st	(United States); 3rd	(Australia); 2nd				26	1	4th
2007	(United Arab Emirates); 3rd	(Brazil); 1st	(United States); 2nd	(Turkey); 2nd	(Spain); CAN	(Switzerland); 1st	(United Kingdom); 2nd	(Hungary); 3rd	(Portugal); 3rd	(United States); 1st	(Mexico); CAN	(Australia); 5th	47	3	2nd
2008	(United Arab Emirates); 1st	(United States); 1st	(United States); 2nd	(Sweden); CAN	(Netherlands); 1st	(United Kingdom); 7th	(Hungary); 3rd	(Portugal); 10th	(Spain); CAN	(Australia); 1st			54	4	2nd
2009	(United Arab Emirates); 2nd	(United States); 2nd	(Canada); 1st	(Hungary); 2nd	(Portugal); 1st	(Spain); 1st							67	3	1st
2010	(United Arab Emirates); 1st	(Australia); 3rd	(Brazil); 3rd	(Canada); 2nd	(United States); 1st	(Germany); 2nd	(Hungary); CAN	(Portugal); CAN					64	2	1st
2014	(United Arab Emirates); 1st	(Croatia); 2nd	(Malaysia); 5th	(Poland); 5th	(United Kingdom); 1st	(United States); 5th	(United States); 7th	(Austria); 5th					51	2	3rd
2015	(United Arab Emirates); 1st	(Japan); 1st	(Croatia); 8th	(Hungary); 2nd	(United Kingdom); 1st	(Austria); 2nd	(United States); 1st	(United States); 2nd					76	4	1st

Legend:

- CAN: Cancelled
- DNP: Did not participate
- DNS: Did not show
- DQ: Disqualified
- NC: Not classified

== See also ==
- Competition aerobatics
- Red Bull Air Race World Championship

Sporting positions
Preceded by Hannes Arch	Red Bull Air Race World Series Champion; 2009–2010	Succeeded by Nigel Lamb (2014)
Preceded by Allan McNish	Segrave Trophy; 2009	Succeeded by Adrian Newey
