= Red Bull Air Race World Championship =

Air racing world tournament

- Category: Air racing
- Country: International
- Inaugural season: 2003
- Folded: 2019

The World Championship Air Race was a series of air races sanctioned by the World Air Sports Federation (FAI). Originally established in 2003 as the Red Bull Air Race, and created by Red Bull GmbH, the event involved competitors navigating a challenging obstacle course in the fastest time. Pilots flew individually against the clock and had to complete tight turns through a slalom course consisting of pylons, known as "air gates".

The races were held mainly over water near cities, but were also held at airfields or natural wonders. They were accompanied by a supporting program of show flights. Races were usually flown on weekends with the first day for qualification then knockout finals the day after. The events attracted large crowds and were broadcast, both live and taped, in many nations.

At each venue, the top eight places earned World Championship points. The air racer with the most points at the end of the Championship became Red Bull Air Race World Champion.

After a three-year hiatus for safety improvements and reorganisation, the Air Race resumed in 2014.

In May 2019 Red Bull announced the cancellation of the Red Bull Air Race after 2019 and the shortening of the 2019 race calendar to four races.

In February 2021, the FAI announced a new promoter will revive the FAI-sanctioned air racing series in 2022, the World Championship Air Race. World Championship Air Race intends to change race aircraft with sustainable fuels, electric drivetrains and electric Vertical Take-off and Landing (eVTOL) airplanes from 2024 (the third season). The contract is for fifteen years.

Alternative lighter aircraft racing events involving soft wing aircraft such as the Parabatix Sky Racers are following in the footsteps of the Red Bull air race while paving a new direction for a different kind of air race with more emphasis on ground-skimming precision flying and out-of-cockpit pilot interaction.

== History ==
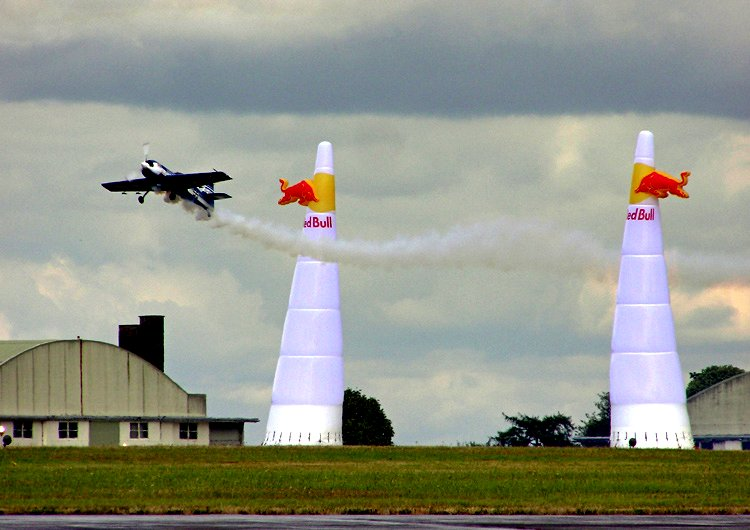
Action at Kemble Airport, Gloucestershire, England in June 2004

The Red Bull Air Race was conceived in 2001 in the Red Bull sports think-tank. The aim was to develop a new aviation race that would challenge the ability of the world's best pilots, creating a race in the sky that was not simply about speed, but also precision and skill. The answer was to build a specially designed obstacle course which the pilots would navigate at high speeds.

Development of the prototypes of what are now known as the "air gates" began in 2002 and renowned Hungarian pilot Péter Besenyei successfully completed the first test flight through them. After two years in planning and development, the first official Red Bull Air Race was ready to take off in Zeltweg, Austria in 2003. A second was staged the same year near Budapest in Hungary.

In 2004, three races took place in Kemble (England), Budapest (Hungary) and Reno (USA). The series was expanded in 2005 to become the Red Bull Air Race World Series. Ten pilots competed in seven races around the world – Mike Mangold was crowned the champion with Péter Besenyei and Kirby Chambliss in second and third place respectively. Eight races took place in 2006 with 11 pilots competing. Kirby Chambliss was crowned the champion for the Series' second season. In 2007 the calendar was extended to include ten races with the first race on South American soil taking place in Rio de Janeiro. Mike Mangold reclaimed the title of Red Bull Air Race World Champion 2007. 12 pilots took part in 2008 in eight races around the globe and Austrian pilot Hannes Arch became the first European to win the championship. The largest number of pilots so far took part in six races in 2009. 15 pilots from 12 different countries competed for the world championship title, this time with Brit Paul Bonhomme coming out on top, after coming so close the previous two years.

In the 2010 series, during training runs prior to the race, Brazilian pilot Adilson Kindlemann crashed his plane into the Swan River in Perth. Rescuers were on site within seconds and Kindlemann was rushed to Royal Perth Hospital where it was determined that he had suffered no serious injury. As of 2014, it is the only crash in the history of the Red Bull Air Race.

=== 2011, 2012 and 2013 series cancelled ===
The 2011 series of races worldwide was cancelled. The decision was taken by Red Bull on 27 July 2010 to allow for a "headquarters" restructure as well as the implementation of new safety measures.

The 2012 series was also cancelled; "There will be no races in 2012, that’s true," said Red Bull Air Race Team spokesperson Nadja Zele in an email message to AOPA. "A revamped concept and a fixed race calendar will be revealed in 2013."

Eventually, the 2013 series was cancelled as well. However, in October 2013, it was announced that the Red Bull Air Race World Championship would return in 2014. Training for the upcoming season took place at Olney airport in Texas. The Championship finally returned in Abu Dhabi on 28 February 2014.

=== Cancellation and abandoned 2022 revival ===
With dwindling corporate interest, Red Bull decided not to continue the Red Bull Air Race World Championship beyond the 2019 season.

In February 2021, the World Air Sports Federation announced a new promoter, Willie Cruickshank, and his Air Race World Championship organisation, with the intention of the series returning in 2022.

In February 2022, the first race of the new series was announced when Air Race announced they had signed a 3 year deal with Indonesia. Air Race would've been hosted in Jakarta, Indonesia on 14–16 October 2022 among other rounds on the planned calendar. However, the 2022 season was cancelled due to COVID and the "global economic situation".

=== Successor series: AIR RACE X ===
Following the end of the Red Bull Air Race in 2019, former champion Yoshihide Muroya launched AIR RACE X in 2023 as a next-generation air racing series combining real flight with digital technology.

The series introduced a Digital/Remote race format in which pilots fly identical virtual courses from their home bases, with results synchronized through GPS-based telemetry. The first event, held in Shibuya, Tokyo (October 2023), featured remote racing and augmented-reality viewing for spectators. Subsequent digital rounds have been staged in Osaka (2025) and other cities.

AIR RACE X plans to resume in-person Live Races beginning in its next phase, integrating physical pylons and city-based courses with digital broadcast technology. The organization describes its future structure as a combination of Live / Digital / Remote racing designed for global accessibility and sustainability.

== Format ==
In earlier seasons, 2005 and 2006, pilots first ran two qualifying rounds to determine starting order, with the fastest time starting last. The race was then run over two rounds, and the combined time of both rounds determines the winner. Starting in 2007, a new knock-out format was introduced which was modified for 2008.

=== Flying sessions ===
- Training: Takes place on the days preceding Qualifying Day. There are two training days each consisting of two training sessions. Pilots must take part in at least two mandatory training sessions. Time of final training session (training 4) determines the starting order for Qualifying.
- Qualifying: Takes place on Qualifying Day, the day before Race Day. Includes two mandatory qualifying sessions. Best time counts.
- Round of 14: Takes place on Race Day. The fastest seven from each heat and the fastest loser compete for a place in the Round of 8. Results in the Round of 14 determine 9th to 14th place race positions.
- Round of 8: Eight fastest from Round of 14 compete in the Round of 8. The fastest four pilots from each heat advance to the Final 4. Results in the Super 8 determine 5th to 8th place race positions.
- Final 4: Four fastest from the Super 8 compete in the Final 4 for 1st, 2nd, 3rd and 4th place race positions.

=== Starting order ===
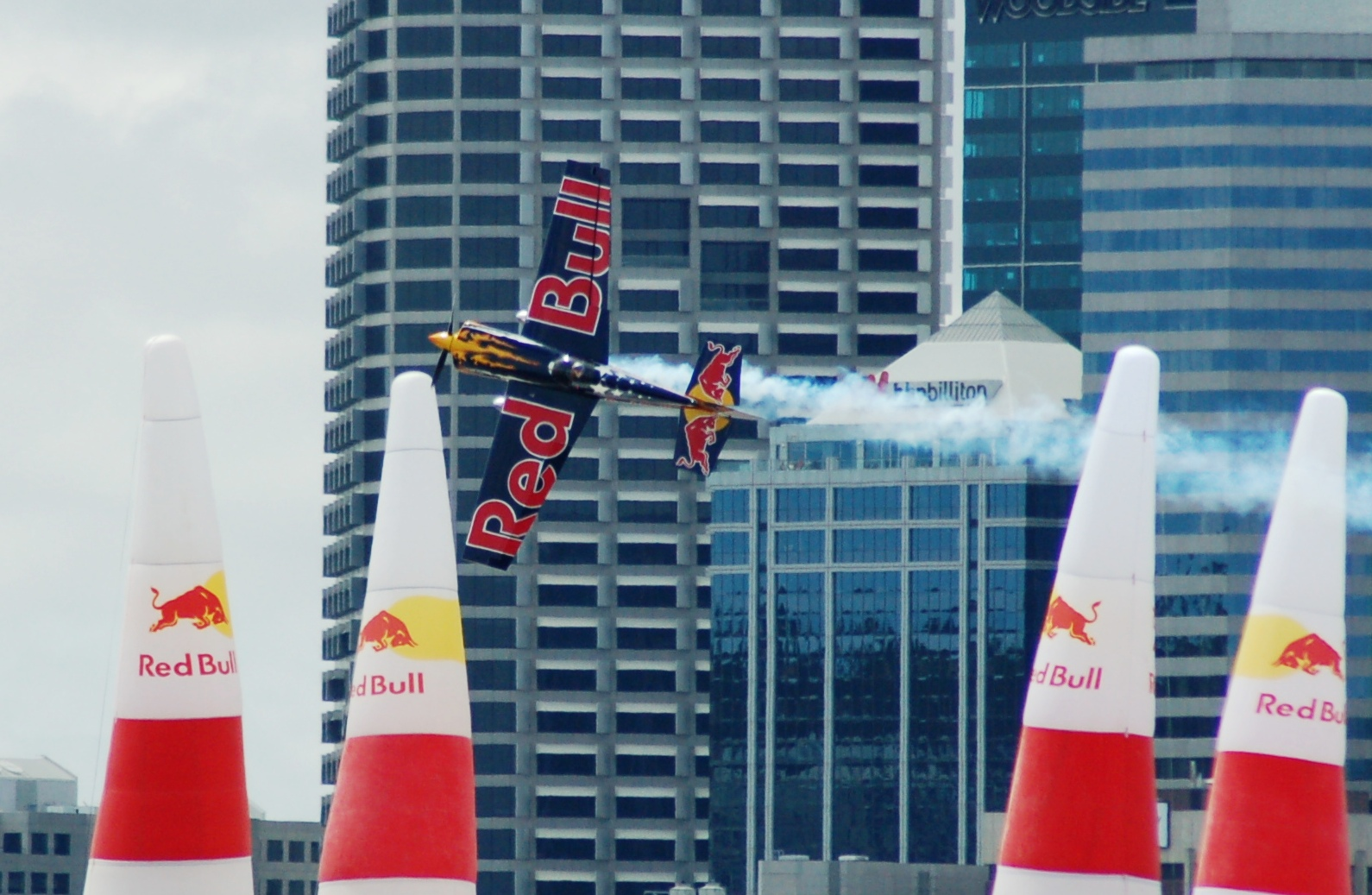
2006 champion, Kirby Chambliss, crossing the Quadro in the prescribed knife-edge flight in Perth, 2006

The starting order is the order in which the pilots will race in each flying session. The starting order for Training is defined by the results of the last year's Red Bull Air Race World Championship standings. The highest ranking pilot starts first. Starting order for new race pilots is determined by a draw. The starting order for Qualifying is defined by the results of the fourth training session. The order is reversed so that the slowest pilot from the fourth training session starts first. The starting order for all sessions on Race Day is determined by the results in Qualifying. The order is reversed so that the slowest pilot from Qualifying starts first.

=== World Championship points ===
Based on the pilot's place at each race, World Championship points are awarded. The current points scoring format see first place receive 25 points, second place receive 22, on through thirteenth who receives one.

Position	1st	2nd	3rd	4th	5th	6th	7th	8th	9th	10th	11th	12th	13th	14th
Points	25	22	20	18	14	13	12	11	5	4	3	2	1	0

== Rules ==
Pilots are required to complete the 5–6-kilometre-long (3.1–3.7 mi) track and fly between the air gates following a predetermined race track configuration. Failure to do this correctly results in penalty seconds being added to their race time. Penalty seconds can be added for an incorrect passing of an air gate or passing an air gate at an incorrect orientation. For more serious breaches of the rules, pilots may be ruled as "did not finish" or disqualified.

Three different gate types require a specific manner of crossing. Double cone gates must be crossed in level flight, single cone gates must be crossed in a 90° angle, and slalom flying through the chicane gates (knife or level flying not mandatory).

Penalties are incurred for violations of the rules, as follows.

=== 1 second penalty ===
- Insufficient or no smoke
- Overweight

=== 2 second penalty ===
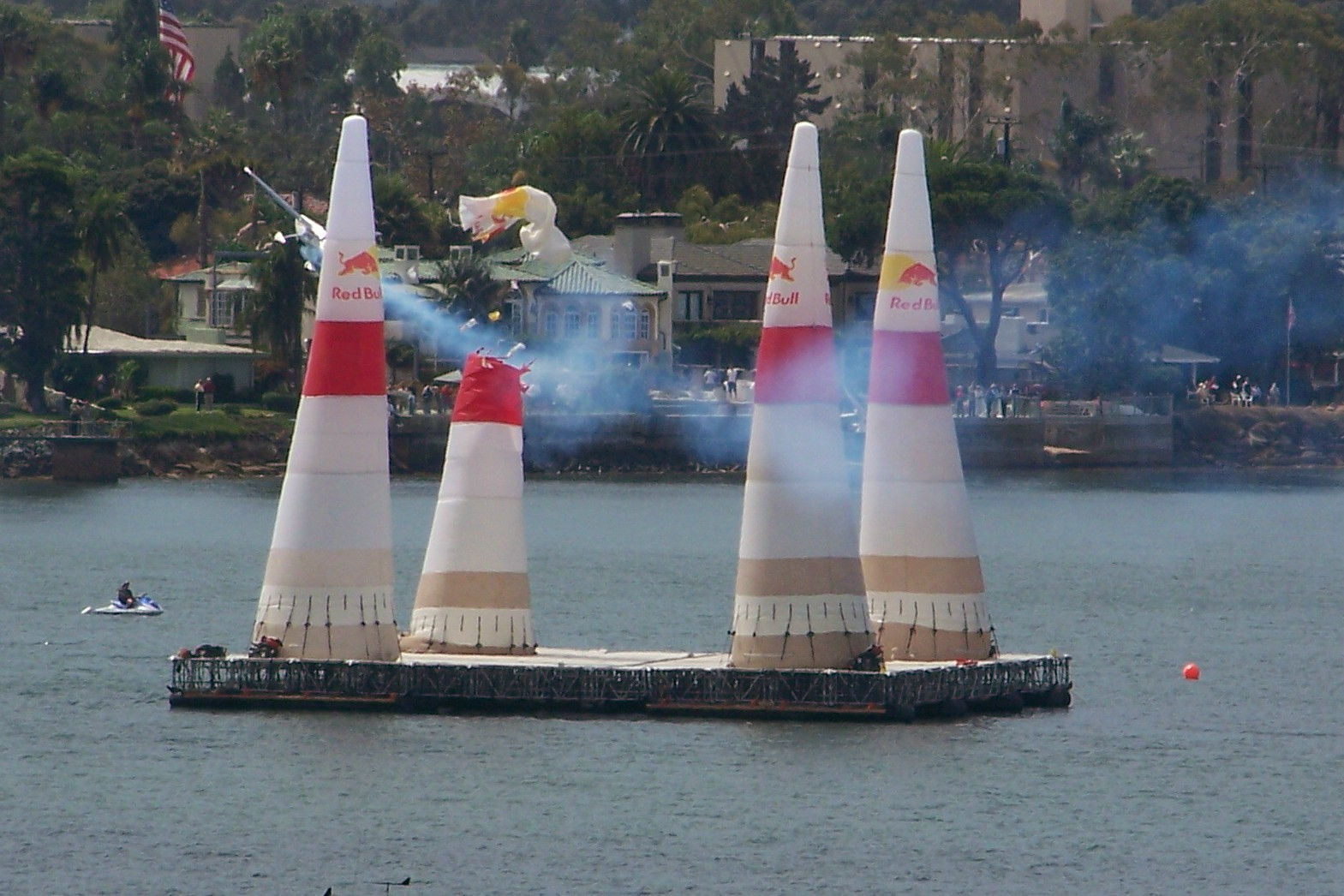
A plane slices through a pylon, resulting in a penalty.

- Flying too high, through or over an air gate
- Incorrect level (at an angle) crossing through an air gate

=== 3 second penalty ===
- Hitting a gate (1st time)
- Hitting a gate (2nd time)

=== Did not finish ===
- Deviating from course
- Exceeding 200 knots (370 km/h; 230 mph) when crossing the start gate
- Aircraft weight below 698 kilograms (1,539 lb) after the race
- Exceeding 10g for more than 0.6 seconds
- Exceeding maximum load factor of 12g
- Hitting a gate (3rd time)

=== Disqualification ===
- Uncontrolled movements or flight
- Close to ground pull-up from descent
- Crossing safety line
- Negative g-turn around a pylon
- Flying below 15 metres (49 ft) between air gates
- Flying into clouds
- Entering course at an angle exceeding 45 degrees
- Ignoring Race Director commands

== Aircraft ==
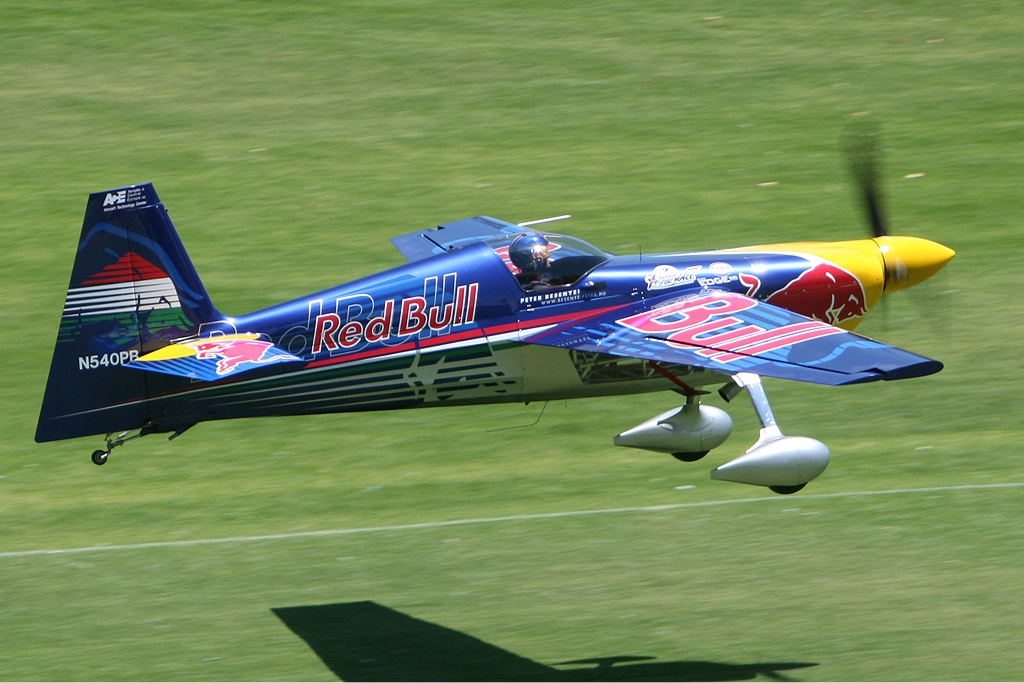
Zivko Edge 540

The competitors use high-performance aerobatic planes such as the Zivko Edge 540, MXS-R, and the Corvus Racer 540, equipped with Lycoming Engines. All aircraft have a wingspan less than 7.6 metres (25 ft) and top speeds ranging from 406 to 426 km/h (252 to 265 mph).

Competitors have tuned their aircraft for better performance. However, the safety implications of engine or airframe failures mean that performance tuning by individual teams, though commonly done in motorsports, is strictly limited in scope.

Each aircraft carries a TL elektronic TL-3424_EXT accelerometer. It transmits timing and speed data which is picked up and displayed on large spectator screens.

== Air gates ==
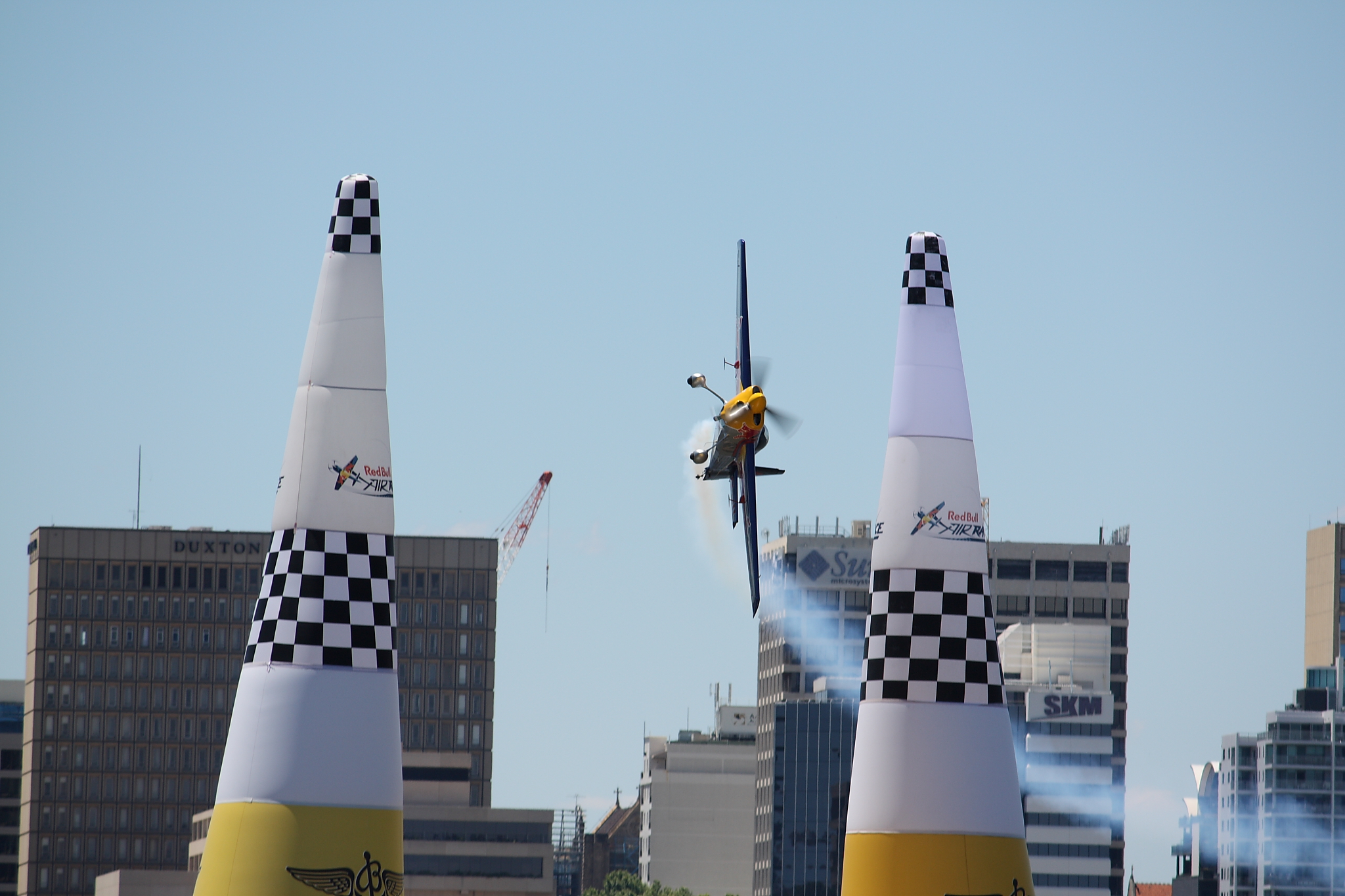
Péter Besenyei crossing between the start/finish pylons in Perth, 2008. The grey horizontal stripes in the pylons, e.g. below the checkered designs, are zippers.

The air gates are made up of one or two pylons, each approximately 25 metres (82 ft) high, and spaced 10 to 15 metres (33 to 49 ft) apart depending on the gate.

The first prototype pylon was developed by Martin Jehart of Bellutti Protection Systems, an Austrian engineering firm specializing in the manufacturing of technical materials and tarpaulin. They initially used a latex balloon for crash tests and aerodynamic studies and after many tests and research settled on the use of a combination of different materials, the crucial component being spinnaker ripstop nylon, an extremely lightweight and flexible material used for making sails for boats. This would prove to be a breakthrough in the development of the air gates producing a pylon that would rip instantaneously when hit by a plane. Over 70 tests of the pylon were carried out on the ground using a car with a wing strapped on the roof before they were ready to undergo tests with a real plane. Eight different cars were used in these tests as well as a trailer and truck. Hungarian pilot, Péter Besenyei worked closely with the team and attempted the first deliberate pylon hit in early 2003 with positive results. The first air gates, which were cylindrical, were finally ready to be used at the very first Red Bull Air Races held in Austria and Hungary later that year.

The air gates play a vital role in the Red Bull Air Race, but must also fulfill complex and contradictory demands. They have to be delicate enough to burst apart the instant they are touched by an aircraft and sturdy enough to remain stationary in all weather conditions, including stormy weather and strong winds. The early cylindrical pylons fulfilled the first criterion but proved to be too unstable in the wind.

The answer came in 2004 with the cone design. These air gates measure 5 metres (16 ft) across the base and .75 metres (2.5 ft) at their tip. Inside the air gate a relatively high, and carefully monitored, pressure level is maintained with the use of powerful electrical, petrol-powered blowers that help keep the air gates steady even in windy conditions. Over the years the air gate design has developed and improved and today's air gates can withstand wind speeds of up to 60 km/h (37 mph) without being blown over. Their stability is further reinforced with 12 ground attachments, each strong enough to hold 1,200 kilograms (2,600 lb). For races over water, the air gates are secured to a floating barge which has stability anchors.

Unlike early models, the current structures are made up of six sections attached together by zippers and Velcro to allow quick replacement if damaged by a plane. Prior to May 2008, the races had used more than eight tons of fabric for the various pylons, and the average life of each pylon was 15 races. Thirty-five pylons are transported to each race, and at each race's completion, the pylons are sent to Innsbruck, Austria to be repaired.

If a pylon is hit by the plane, it is designed to break apart, preventing it from harming the plane and pilot. The damaged parts of the pylon are replaced by course personnel nicknamed "air gators". It usually takes a few minutes to replace a pylon. The record for the setup of a replacement pylon is 1 minute 30 seconds, set in 2007.

== Champions ==
=== Elite/Master Class ===
Season	Champion	Second	Third	Fourth
2003	(Hungary) Péter Besenyei	(Germany) Klaus Schrodt	(United States) Kirby Chambliss	(Lithuania) Jurgis Kairys
2004	(United States) Kirby Chambliss	(Hungary) Péter Besenyei	(United Kingdom) Steve Jones	(Germany) Klaus Schrodt
2005	(United States) Mike Mangold	(Hungary) Péter Besenyei	(United States) Kirby Chambliss	(Germany) Klaus Schrodt
2006	(United States) Kirby Chambliss	(Hungary) Péter Besenyei	(United States) Mike Mangold	(United Kingdom) Paul Bonhomme
2007	(United States) Mike Mangold	(United Kingdom) Paul Bonhomme	(Hungary) Péter Besenyei	(United States) Kirby Chambliss
2008	(Austria) Hannes Arch	(United Kingdom) Paul Bonhomme	(United States) Kirby Chambliss	(United States) Mike Mangold
2009	(United Kingdom) Paul Bonhomme	(Austria) Hannes Arch	(Australia) Matt Hall	(United States) Kirby Chambliss
2010	(United Kingdom) Paul Bonhomme	(Austria) Hannes Arch	(United Kingdom) Nigel Lamb	(United States) Kirby Chambliss
2011–2013: not held
2014	(United Kingdom) Nigel Lamb	(Austria) Hannes Arch	(United Kingdom) Paul Bonhomme	(France) Nicolas Ivanoff
2015	(United Kingdom) Paul Bonhomme	(Australia) Matt Hall	(Austria) Hannes Arch	(Czech Republic) Martin Šonka
2016	(Germany) Matthias Dolderer	(Australia) Matt Hall	(Austria) Hannes Arch	(United Kingdom) Nigel Lamb
2017	(Japan) Yoshihide Muroya	(Czech Republic) Martin Šonka	(Canada) Pete McLeod	(United States) Kirby Chambliss
2018	(Czech Republic) Martin Šonka	(Australia) Matt Hall	(United States) Michael Goulian	(France) Mikaël Brageot
2019	(Australia) Matt Hall	(Japan) Yoshihide Muroya	(Czech Republic) Martin Šonka	(Canada) Pete McLeod

=== Challenger Class ===
Season	Champion	Points leader
2014	(Czech Republic) Petr Kopfstein	(France) François Le Vot
2015	(France) Mikaël Brageot	(France) Mikaël Brageot
2016	(Germany) Florian Bergér	(Germany) Florian Bergér
2017	(Germany) Florian Bergér	(Germany) Florian Bergér
2018	(Poland) Luke Czepiela	(Germany) Florian Bergér
2019	(Germany) Florian Bergér	(Germany) Florian Bergér

== Most wins ==
As of 8 September 2019, up to and including the race of Chiba.

=== Elite/Master Class ===
Rank	Pilot	Wins
1	(United Kingdom) Paul Bonhomme	19
2	(Austria) Hannes Arch	11
3	(United States) Kirby Chambliss	10
4	(United States) Mike Mangold	9
5	(Hungary) Péter Besenyei	8
5	(Japan) Yoshihide Muroya	8
7	(Australia) Matt Hall	7
8	(Czech Republic) Martin Šonka	6
9	(France) Nicolas Ivanoff	5
10	(Germany) Matthias Dolderer	3
10	(United States) Michael Goulian	3
12	(United Kingdom) Steve Jones	2
13	(United Kingdom) Nigel Lamb	1
13	(Canada) Pete McLeod	1
Total		93

=== Challenger Class ===
Rank	Pilot	Wins
1	(Germany) Florian Bergér	9
2	(Sweden) Daniel Ryfa	8
3	(France) Mikaël Brageot	4
3	(Hong Kong) Kenny Chiang	4
3	(Poland) Luke Czepiela	4
6	(United States) Kevin Coleman	3
6	(Czech Republic) Petr Kopfstein	3
6	(France) François Le Vot	3
9	(Chile) Cristian Bolton	2
9	(Malaysia) Halim Othman	2
11	(France) Mélanie Astles	1
11	(Italy) Dario Costa	1
11	(Germany) Claudius Spiegel	1
Total		45

== Pilots ==
=== Elite/Master Class ===
Country	Pilot	Races entered in each year														Total		
Country	Pilot			2003	2004	2005	2006	2007	2008	2009	2010	2014	2015	2016	2017	Total	2018	2019
Austria	Hannes Arch					10	8	6	6	8	8	6				52		
Hungary	Péter Besenyei	2	3	7	8	10	8	6	6	8	8					66		
Chile	Cristian Bolton											1	8	8	4	21		
United Kingdom	Paul Bonhomme	2	3	7	8	10	8	6	6	8	8					66		
France	Mikaël Brageot												8	8	4	20		
United States	Kirby Chambliss	1	3	7	8	10	8	6	6	8	8	7	8	8	4	92		
South Africa	Glen Dell						8	6								14		
Germany	Matthias Dolderer							6	6	8	8	7	8	8	4	55		
United States	Michael Goulian		1		8	10	8	6	6	8	8	7	8	8	4	82		
Australia	Matt Hall							6	5	8	8	7	8	8	4	54		
France	Nicolas Ivanoff		2	7	8	10	8	6	6	8	8	7	8	8	4	90		
United Kingdom	Steve Jones	2	3	7	8	10	8									38		
Lithuania	Jurgis Kairys	2														2		
Brazil	Adilson Kindlemann								1							1		
Czech Republic	Petr Kopfstein											7	8	8	4	27		
United Kingdom	Nigel Lamb			3	8	10	8	6	6	8	8	7				64		
France	François Le Vot										8	7	8	8	4	35		
Spain	Alejandro Maclean	2	2	7	8	10	8	6	6							49		
United States	Mike Mangold		1	7	8	10	8	6								40		
United States	David Martin		1													1		
Canada	Pete McLeod							6	6	8	8	7	8	8	4	55		
Japan	Yoshihide Muroya							6	5	8	8	7	8	8	4	54		
United Kingdom	Ben Murphy													8	4	12		
Slovenia	Peter Podlunšek											7	8			15		
Russia	Sergey Rakhmanin					10	8	6	6							30		
Germany	Klaus Schrodt	2	3	7	8	10										30		
Czech Republic	Martin Šonka								6	8	8	7	8	8	4	49		
Spain	Juan Velarde										8	7	8	8	4	35		
Netherlands	Frank Versteegh		3	7	8	10										28		

== Race locations ==
Country	Location	Rounds in													
Country	Location	2003	2004	2005	2006	2007	2008	2009	2010	2014	2015	2016	2017	2018	2019
Australia	Swan River, Perth				9th	12th	9th		2nd						
Austria	Zeltweg Air Base	1st		3rd											
Austria	Red Bull Ring, Spielberg									8th	6th	2nd			
Austria	Wiener Neustadt													6th	
Brazil	Rio de Janeiro					2nd			3rd						
Canada	Windsor, Ontario							3rd	4th						
China	Beijing									^{10}					
Croatia	Rovinj									2nd	3rd				
France	Cannes, Provence-Alpes-Côte d'Azur													2nd	
Germany	Berlin				3rd										
Germany	EuroSpeedway Lausitz								6th			6th	7th		
Hungary	River Danube, Budapest	2nd	2nd	6th	6th	8th	7th	4th	7th^{6}		4th	4th	4th	4th	
Hungary	Zamárdi, Lake Balaton														3rd
Ireland	Rock of Cashel			4th											
Japan	Makuhari, Chiba										2nd	3rd	3rd	3rd	4th
Malaysia	Putrajaya Lake, Putrajaya									3rd					
Mexico	Acapulco, Guerrero					11th^{1}									
Netherlands	Erasmusbrug, Rotterdam			2nd			5th								
Poland	Gdynia									4th					
Portugal	River Douro, Porto					9th	8th	5th					6th		
Portugal	Lisbon								8th^{7}						
Russia	St. Petersburg				4th^{2}										
Russia	Sochi										^{11}				
Russia	Kazan												5th	5th	2nd
Spain	Barcelona				2nd	5th^{3}	^{6}	6th							
Switzerland	Interlaken, Bern					6th									
Sweden	Stockholm						4th^{4}								
Turkey	Golden Horn, Istanbul				5th	4th									
United Arab Emirates	Mina' Zayid, Abu Dhabi			1st	1st	1st	1st	1st	1st	1st	1st	1st	1st	1st	1st
United Kingdom	Longleat			5th	7th										
United Kingdom	Kemble		1st												
United Kingdom	River Thames, London					7th	6th								
United Kingdom	Ascot Racecourse, Ascot									5th	5th	5th			
United States	Monument Valley, Arizona/Utah					3rd									
United States	Reno, Nevada		3rd												
United States	San Diego, California					10th	2nd	2nd					2nd		
United States	San Francisco, California			7th	8th										
United States	Detroit, Michigan						3rd								
United States	New York City/Jersey City								5th^{9}						
United States	Texas Motor Speedway, Fort Worth									6th	7th			8th	
United States	Indianapolis Motor Speedway											7th	8th	7th	
United States	Las Vegas									7th	8th	8th^{5}			

- ^{1} The 11th round of the 2007 season in Acapulco, Mexico was cancelled.
- ^{2} The 4th round of the 2006 season in St. Petersburg, Russia was cancelled.
- ^{3} The 5th round of the 2007 season in Barcelona, Spain was cancelled.
- ^{4} The 4th round of the 2008 season in Stockholm, Sweden was cancelled.
- ^{5} The season finale of the 2016 season in Las Vegas, United States was cancelled.
- ^{6} Race in Spain was cancelled.
- ^{7} Cancelled
- ^{8} Cancelled
- ^{9} Race location was Liberty State Park in Jersey City.
- ^{10} Race in China was cancelled. Replaced by Austria.
- ^{11} Race in Russia was cancelled. Replaced by Croatia.
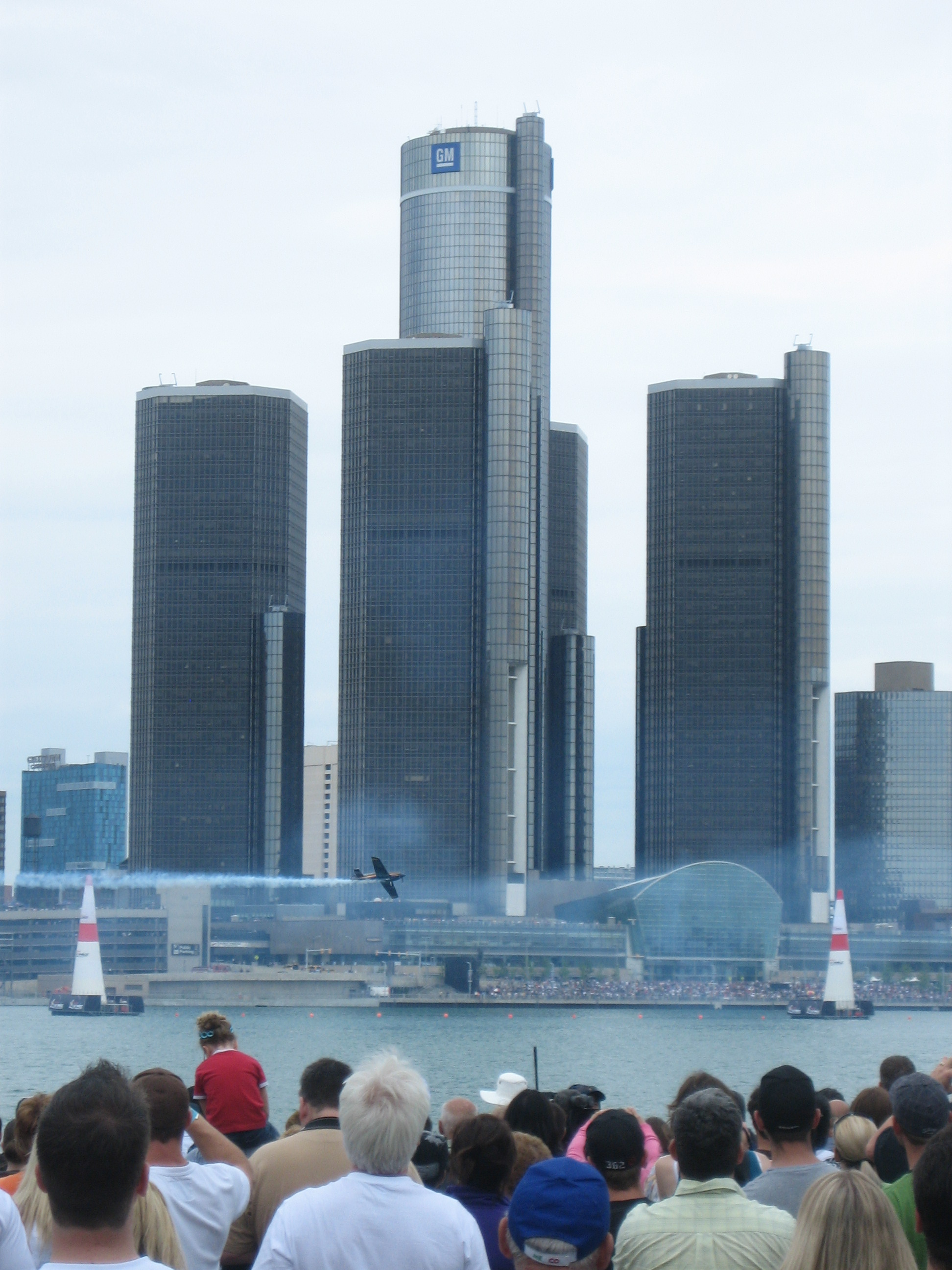
Red Bull Air Race in Detroit-Windsor

== In video games ==
- The Red Bull Air Race is featured as a playable mini-game in a special dedicated "Red Bull space" for PlayStation Home released on 8 January 2009.
- The Red Bull Air Race is also featured as an advanced mission in Microsoft's Flight Simulator X. Additional racing missions and courses were included as part of 2007's Acceleration expansion pack.
- The Red Bull Air Race is now a game for Apple's iPod Touch/iPhone.
- The Red Bull Air Race: The Game announced for PC version will featured the high-end desktop graphics, other console not yet to be confirmed. PC version will release in 2016, developed by Slightly Mad Studios and published by Wing Racers Games Sports.
- Microsoft Flight Simulator 2024 released a Red Bull Air Race mode on 8 December 2025, coinciding with the game's release on PlayStation 5.

== See also ==
- Competition aerobatics
- List of motorsport championships
- Reno Air Races
