= Kirby Chambliss =

American air race pilot

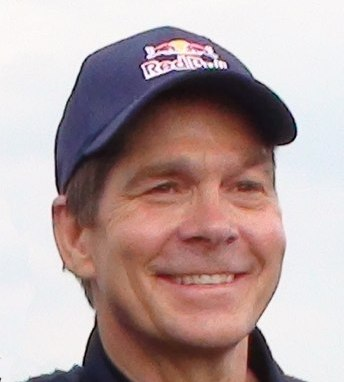
- Chambliss in 2010
- Born: October 18, 1959 (age 66); Corpus Christi, Texas, U.S.
- Spouse: Kellie Chambliss
- Aviation career

Racing career
- First race: 2003
- Best position: 1st (2004, 2006)
- Aircraft: Zivko Edge 540
- Website: teamchambliss.com

Kirby Chambliss (born October 18, 1959, in Corpus Christi, Texas) is an American world champion aerobatic and air race pilot who raced in the Red Bull Air Race World Series under the Red Bull brand.

== Biography ==
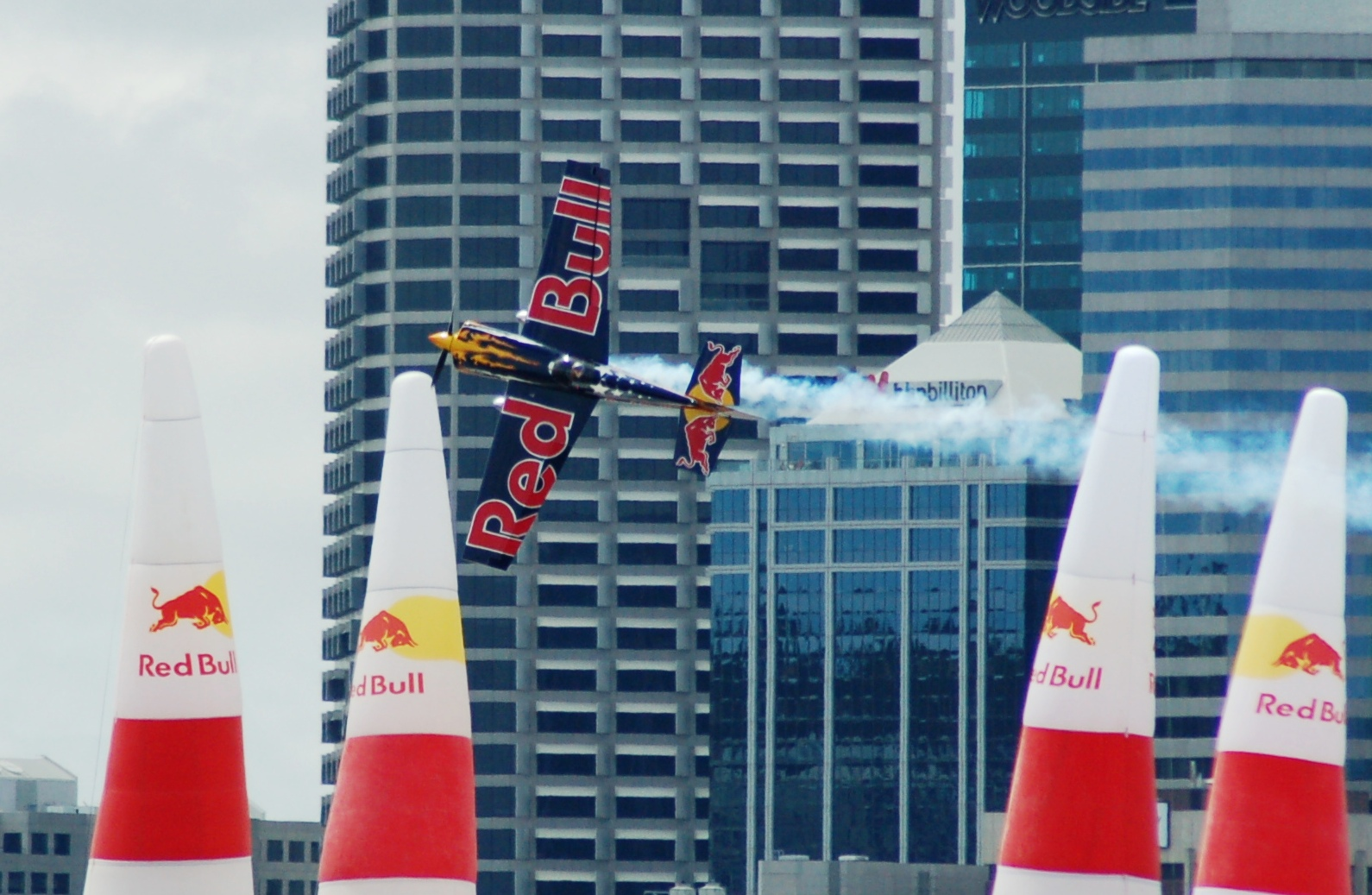
Chambliss racing in Perth, Western Australia in 2006

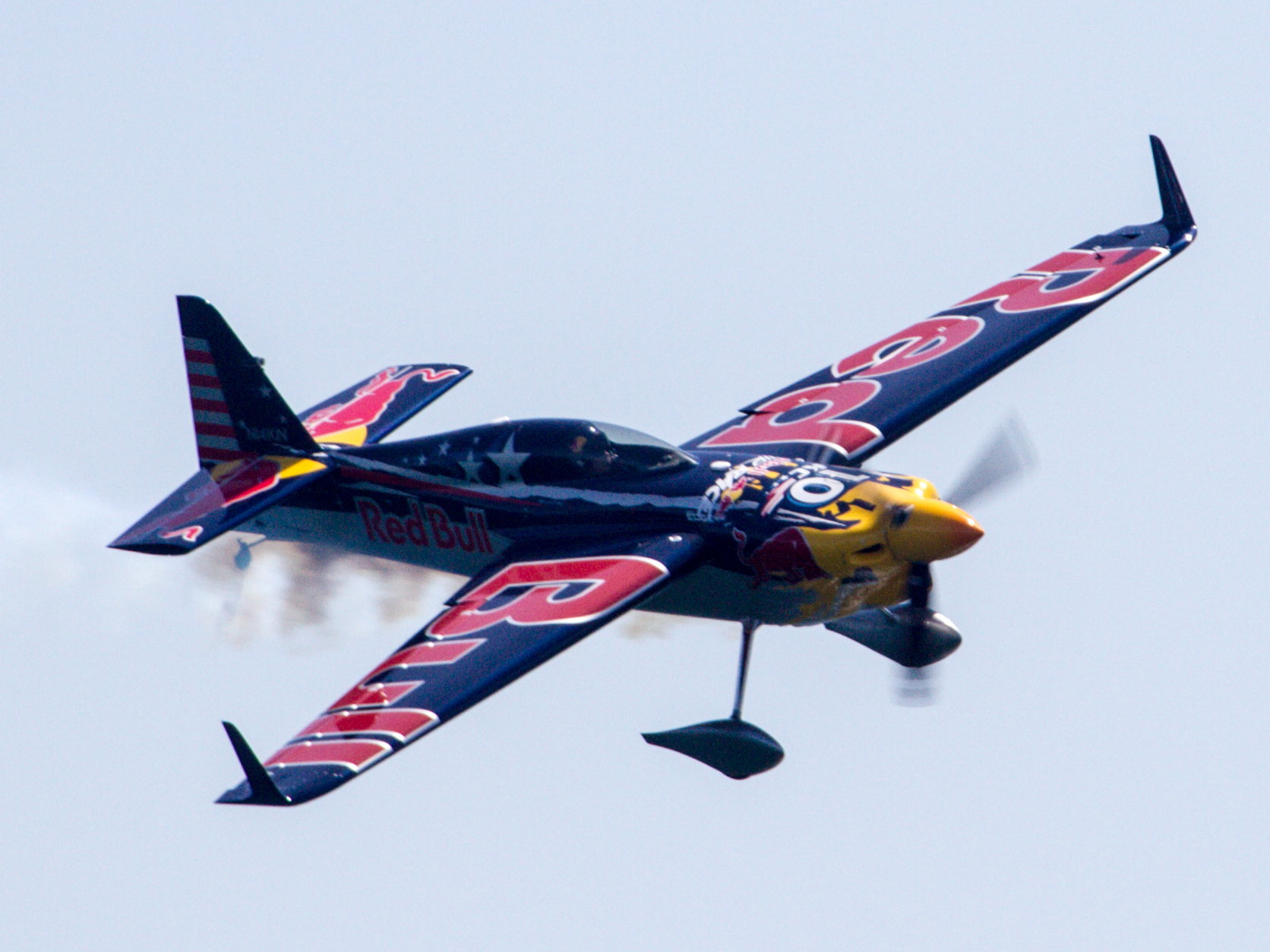
Chambliss competing at the 2017 Red Bull Air Race of Chiba

Chambliss was born at Corpus Christi, Texas, United States. As a boy, he wanted to be a pilot. Chambliss became inspired by watching his father professionally skydive growing up, and was fascinated with the aerial stunts the plane would undergo while chasing the divers as they fell. During his high school years, he fueled aircraft to earn money. By December 1975, at the age of 16, Chambliss debuted in solo flying after formal flight training, and earned his private license the following March. In the beginning, he earned his living as a certified flight instructor and then as a night freight pilot.

His later job as a business jet pilot enabled him in 1985 to take aerobatic flight training and to buy his own aerobatic plane. Winning top honors in his first contest, Chambliss worked his way up to the elite "unlimited" level. In 1997, he became member and then captain of the US Aerobatic Team. He won five U.S. national championships and 13 medals at the world championships. He holds the title 2000 Men's Freestyle World Champion, and has logged over 27,000 flying hours. In 2013, Chambliss lost power performing a high Alpha pass at the Illopango El Salvador Airshow. Chambliss exited his aircraft with minor injuries after a forced landing on a rocky embankment.

Chambliss enjoys performing in traditional airshows throughout the year when he is not training or competing. Since 2003, he takes part at the international aerobatic competition Red Bull Air Race World Series as a member of the Red Bull team along with his teammate Hungarian Péter Besenyei. He was the champion of 2004, and finished the 2006 Series as the champion again with four wins of eight rounds in his Zivko Edge 540 aircraft. To stay in shape for enormous g-forces and exact timing, he runs four miles five days a week.

He lives with his wife and fellow pilot, Kellie, and their daughter, Karly Nicole, at Stellar Airpark in Arizona, United States.

On January 24, 2020, one of Kirby's planes was involved in a fatal aircraft crash at Iztapa Airport in Escuintla while under control of his friend Steve Andelin. Steve and two ground spectators were killed in the crash.

== Racing record ==
=== Complete Red Bull Air Race World Championship results ===
(United States) Kirby Chambliss at the Red Bull Air Race World Series
Year	1	2	3	4	5	6	7	8	9	10	11	12	Points	Wins	Rank
2003	(Austria); DNP	(Hungary); 3rd											4	0	3rd
2004	(United Kingdom); 1st	(Hungary); 1st	(United States); 2nd										17	2	1st
2005	(United Arab Emirates); 9th	(Netherlands); 4th	(Austria); 4th	(Republic of Ireland); DNS	(United Kingdom); 2nd	(Hungary); 2nd	(United States); 2nd						21	0	3rd
2006	(United Arab Emirates); 1st	(Spain); 3rd	(Germany); 1st	(Russia); CAN	(Turkey); 1st	(Hungary); 5th	(United Kingdom); 3rd	(United States); 1st	(Australia); 3rd				38	4	1st
2007	(United Arab Emirates); 4th	(Brazil); 6th	(United States); 4th	(Turkey); 3rd	(Spain); CAN	(Switzerland); 5th	(United Kingdom); 5th	(Hungary); 2nd	(Portugal); 5th	(United States); 2nd	(Mexico); CAN	(Australia); 6th	28	0	4th
2008	(United Arab Emirates); 5th	(United States); 3rd	(United States); 1st	(Sweden); CAN	(Netherlands); 4th	(United Kingdom); 1st	(Hungary); 12th	(Portugal); 2nd	(Spain); CAN	(Australia); 8th			46	2	4th
2009	(United Arab Emirates); 9th	(United States); 12th	(Canada); 3rd	(Hungary); 3rd	(Portugal); 8th	(Spain); 5th							34	0	4th
2010	(United Arab Emirates); 6th	(Australia); 8th	(Brazil); 5th	(Canada); 3rd	(United States); 3rd	(Germany); 6th	(Hungary); CAN	(Portugal); CAN					41	0	4th
Series not held between 2011 and 2013
2014	(United Arab Emirates); 11th	(Croatia); 10th	(Malaysia); 9th	(Poland); 4th	(United Kingdom); 10th	(United States); 10th	(United States); 11th	(Austria); 7th					7	0	10th
2015	(United Arab Emirates); DNS	(Japan); 7th	(Croatia); 11th	(Hungary); 10th	(United Kingdom); 12th	(Austria); 3rd	(United States); 11th	(United States); 12th					9	0	11th
2016	(United Arab Emirates); 4th	(Austria); 6th	(Japan); 3rd	(Hungary); 4th	(United Kingdom); 9th	(Germany); 8th	(United States); 14th	(United States); CAN					30.25	0	8th
2017	(United Arab Emirates); 11th	(United States); 4th	(Japan); 8th	(Hungary); 1st	(Russia); 1st	(Portugal); 4th	(Germany); 6th	(United States); 10th					53	2	4th
2018	(United Arab Emirates); 3rd	(France); 12th	(Japan); 13th	(Hungary); 10th	(Russia); 3rd	(Austria); 7th	(United States); 8th	(United States); 3rd					34	0	6th
2019	(United Arab Emirates); 8th												11	0	8th
Total													229	8	

Legend:

- CAN: Cancelled
- DNP: Did not participate
- DNS: Did not show
- DQ: Disqualified
- NC: Not classified

Sporting positions
Preceded by Péter Besenyei	Red Bull Air Race World Series Champion; 2004	Succeeded by Mike Mangold
Preceded by Mike Mangold	Red Bull Air Race World Series Champion; 2006	Succeeded by Mike Mangold
