= Klaus Schrodt =

German air racer (born 1946)

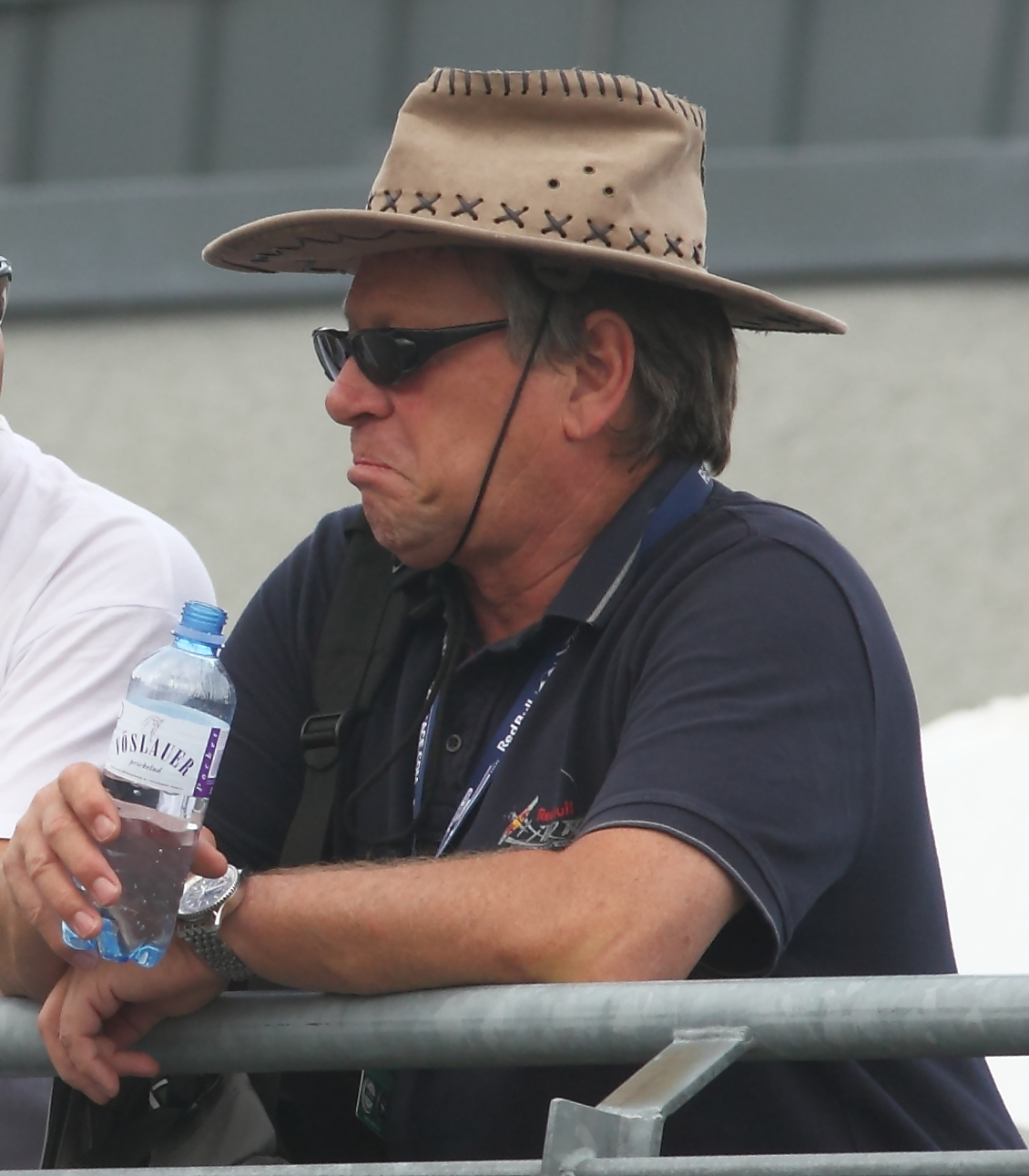
- Schrodt in 2010
- Born: 14 September 1946 (age 80); Dieburg
- Aviation career

Racing career
- First race: 2003
- Best position: 2nd (2003)
- Aircraft: Extra 300S
- Website: Profile at haute-voltige.com

Klaus Schrodt (born 14 September 1946) is a German aviator who formerly raced in the Red Bull Air Race World Series. Before joining the series, Schrodt was an airline pilot and yachtsman.

Whilst being passionate for yachting in his youth, Schrodt maintained a strong interest in flying, travelling 30 kilometres (19 mi) each day in order to clean hangars in exchange for 10 minutes of flying lessons. After completing flight school, he became a pilot for Lufthansa at 19 years old; Schrodt retired in 2002 to focus on aerobatic flying. Schrodt's aviation career has seen him take the German Aerobatic Championship five times, as well as the 2001 and 2005 Freestyle World Aerobatic Championship and the 2002 and 2004 Freestyle European Championships. Klaus has flown over 100 different aircraft, notching up more than 22,000 flying hours.

His interest in yachting led to crossing the Atlantic Ocean on three separate solo trips, the first of which was in 1976.

(Germany) Klaus Schrodt at the Red Bull Air Race World Series
Year	1	2	3	4	5	6	7	8	9	10	11	12	Points	Wins	Rank
2003	(Austria); NC	(Hungary); 2nd											5	0	2nd
2004	(United Kingdom); 4th	(Hungary); 2nd	(United States); DNS										8	0	3rd
2005	(United Arab Emirates); 5th	(Netherlands); 2nd	(Austria); 7th	(Republic of Ireland); 4th	(United Kingdom); 4th	(Hungary); 5th	(United States); 3rd						18	0	4th
2006	(United Arab Emirates); DQ	(Spain); 4th	(Germany); 4th	(Russia); CAN	(Turkey); 9th	(Hungary); 7th	(United Kingdom); 8th	(United States); 6th	(Australia); 10th				7	0	7th
2007	(United Arab Emirates); 9th	(Brazil); 12th	(United States); 13th	(Turkey); 9th	(Spain); CAN	(Switzerland); 11th	(United Kingdom); 12th	(Hungary); 13th	(Portugal); 13th	(United States); 13th	(Mexico); CAN	(Australia); 13th	0	0	13th

- CAN: Cancelled
- DNP: Did not participate
- DNS: Did not show
- DQ: Disqualified
- NC: Not classified
