= Michael Goulian =

American air racer (born 1968)

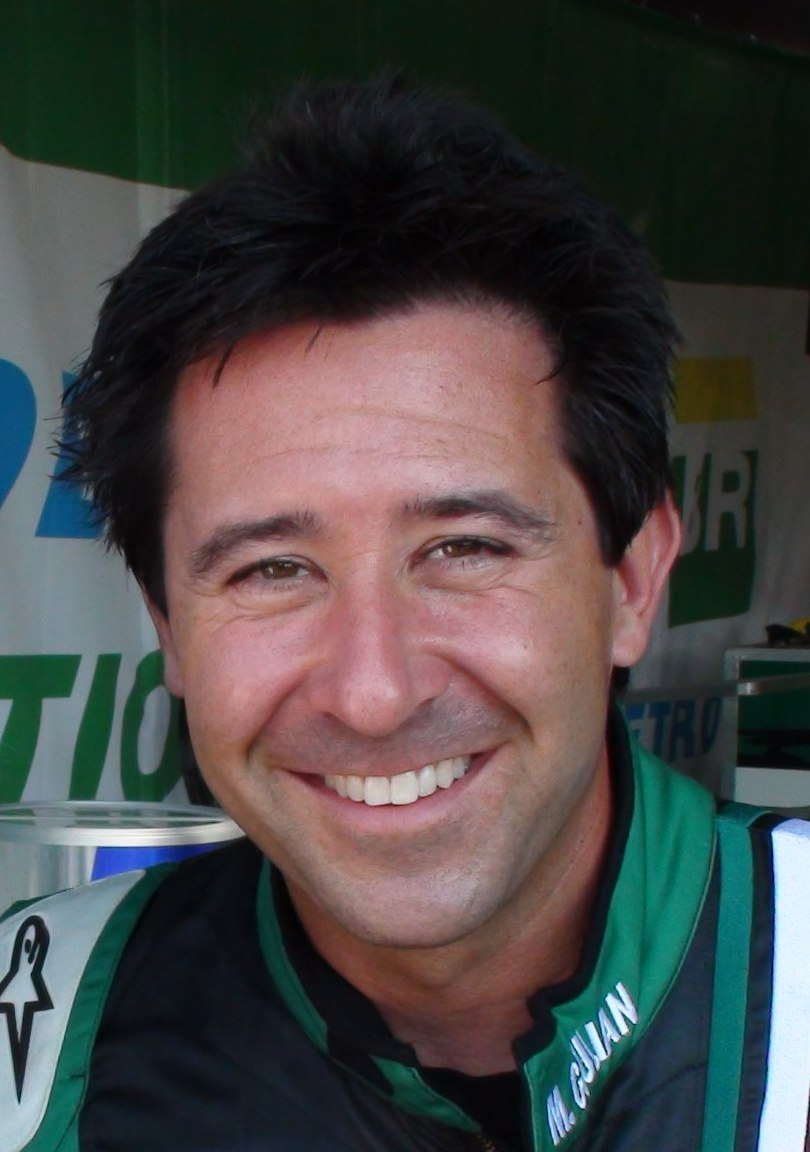
- Goulian in 2010
- Born: September 4, 1968 (age 58); Winthrop, Massachusetts
- Spouse: Karin Goulian
- Aviation career

Racing career
- First race: 2004
- Best position: 1st
- Aircraft: Zivko Edge 540; Extra 330SC
- Website: mikegoulian.com

Michael George "Mike" Goulian (born September 4, 1968 in Winthrop, Massachusetts) is an American aerobatic national champion aviator who raced in the Red Bull Air Race World Series under the number 99.

== Biography ==
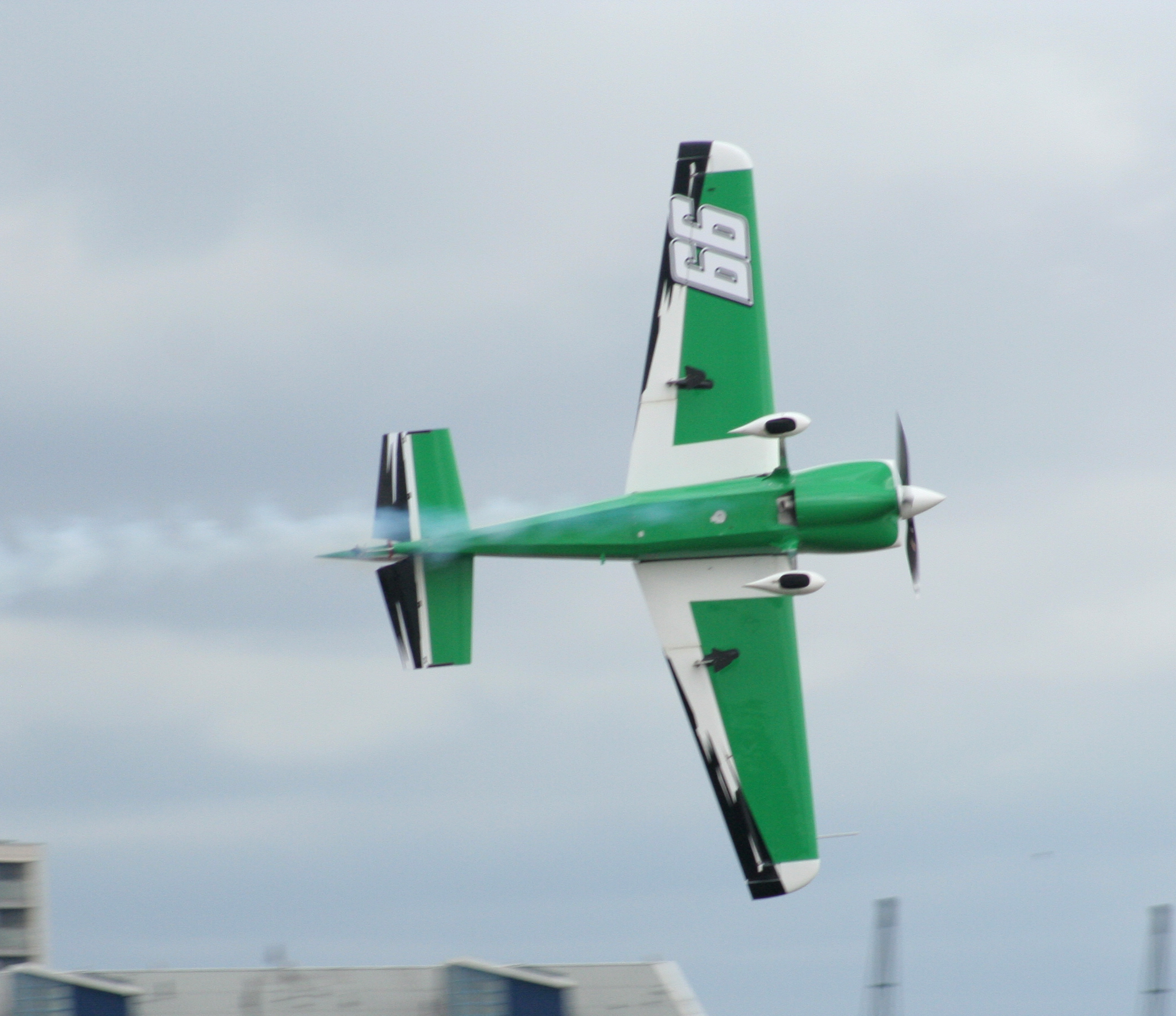
Goulian racing in London in 2008

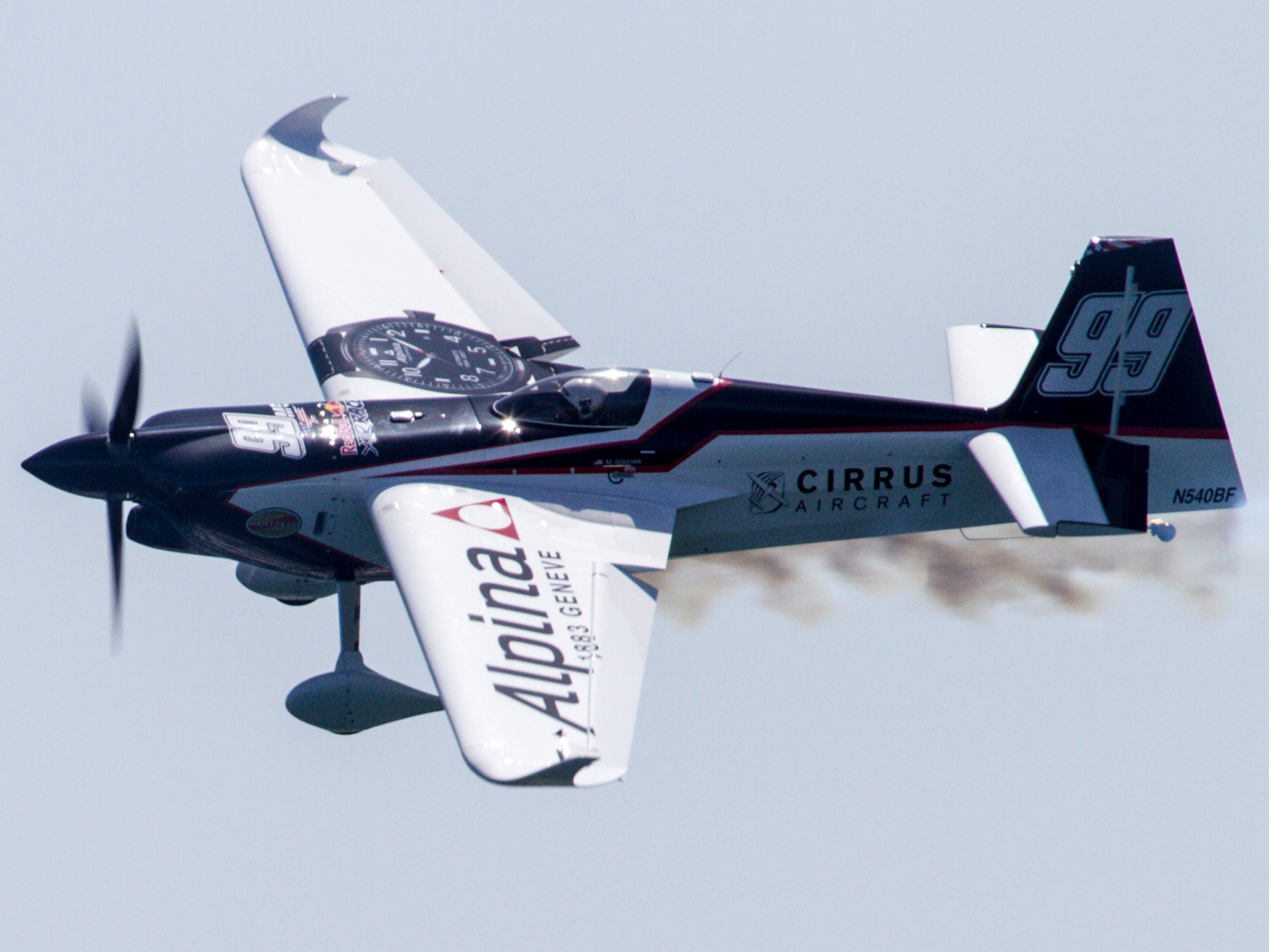
Goulian flying his Edge 540 at the 2017 Red Bull Air Race of Chiba

Goulian was born into an aviation business family, which founded Executive Flyers Aviation, one of the largest flying schools in the Northeastern United States in 1964. Michael's father Myron Goulian (also known as "Mike") was an FAA examiner. Michael grew up by washing airplanes and sweeping the hangar floor. He learned to fly before he could drive a car and soloed in a Cessna 150 on his 16th birthday in 1984.

Inspired by the 1980 movie Cloud Dancer, Goulian began his aerobatic training in 1985 during his pilot study. He then established an aerobatic school within Executive Flyers Aviation. While earning his living as a corporate airline pilot, Goulian worked his way toward the top ranks of air show display flying and competition aerobatics and became US National Champion in the Advanced Category at the age of 22, making him the youngest pilot ever to have won that competition. In 1992, he was the top-ranked US male aerobatic pilot and Silver Medalist in the Unlimited Category, an achievement he repeated in 1993. In 1995, he became the US National Champion in the Unlimited Category. He was a member of the US Aerobatic Team in 1994, 1996 and 1998.

In 2006, Goulian was awarded the prestigious Art Scholl Memorial Award for airshow showmanship by the International Council of Airshows (ICAS).

Goulian is co-author of a series of books called Basic and Advanced Aerobatics, published by McGraw Hill, which became the industry standard for aerobatic flight training manuals.

He is the co-founder of two Bedford, Massachusetts, United States–based aviation companies: Linear Air, which offers air taxi services using very light jets and piston-powered aircraft, and Mike Goulian Aviation, which is a Cirrus aircraft training, management and rental company.

In 2021, AOPA named Goulian chairman of its Hat in The Ring Society, a philanthropic foundation that promotes aviation access, safety and education.

He flies a Cirrus SR22T for his business and personal travels, and is an avid skier, ice hockey player and golfer. He has been married to Karin Goulian since 2000, with whom he has one daughter: Emily (born 2006).

== Racing record ==
=== Red Bull Air Race World Championship ===
==== 2004-2010 ====
(United States) Michael Goulian at the Red Bull Air Race World Series
Year	1	2	3	4	5	6	7	8	9	10	11	12	Points	Wins	Rank
2004	(United Kingdom); DNP	(Hungary); DNP	(United States); 4th										3	0	6th
2006	(United Arab Emirates); 6th	(Spain); 9th	(Germany); 5th	(Russia); CAN	(Turkey); DNS	(Hungary); 4th	(United Kingdom); 5th	(United States); 5th	(Australia); 6th				11	0	5th
2007	(United Arab Emirates); 7th	(Brazil); DNS	(United States); 11th	(Turkey); 7th	(Spain); CAN	(Switzerland); 6th	(United Kingdom); DNS	(Hungary); 9th	(Portugal); 9th	(United States); 9th	(Mexico); CAN	(Australia); 2nd	6	0	8th
2008	(United Arab Emirates); 11th	(United States); 5th	(United States); 8th	(Sweden); CAN	(Netherlands); 7th	(United Kingdom); 11th	(Hungary); 8th	(Portugal); 6th	(Spain); CAN	(Australia); 10th			16	0	8th
2009	(United Arab Emirates); 14th	(United States); 14th	(Canada); 6th	(Hungary); 1st	(Portugal); 9th	(Spain); 11th							22	1	10th
2010	(United Arab Emirates); 4th	(Australia); 11th	(Brazil); 8th	(Canada); 6th	(United States); 7th	(Germany); 13th	(Hungary); CAN	(Portugal); CAN					24	0	9th
Series not held between 2011 and 2013

==== 2014-2019 ====
Year	1	2	3	4	5	6	7	8	Points	Wins	Rank
2014	(United Arab Emirates); DNS	(Croatia); 12th	(Malaysia); 12th	(Poland); 9th	(United Kingdom); 12th	(United States); 11th	(United States); 10th	(Austria); 6th	3	0	12th
2015	(United Arab Emirates); 12th	(Japan); 6th	(Croatia); 4th	(Hungary); 11th	(United Kingdom); 9th	(Austria); 7th	(United States); 9th	(United States); 6th	13	0	10th
2016	(United Arab Emirates); 5th	(Austria); 10th	(Japan); 13th	(Hungary); 10th	(United Kingdom); 4th	(Germany); 6th	(United States); 10th	(United States); CAN	19.75	0	10th
2017	(United Arab Emirates); 6th	(United States); 8th	(Japan); 5th	(Hungary); 12th	(Russia); 3rd	(Portugal); 10th	(Germany); 14th	(United States); 7th	28	0	9th
2018	(United Arab Emirates); 1st	(France); 3rd	(Japan); 2nd	(Hungary); 4th	(Russia); 2nd	(Austria); 12th	(United States); 1st	(United States); 8th	73	2	3rd
2019	(United Arab Emirates); 3rd								21		3rd

Legend:

- CAN: Cancelled
- DNP: Did not participate
- DNS: Did not show
- DQ: Disqualified
- NC: Not classified

== See also ==
- Competition aerobatics
