= Mike Mangold =

American Aviator (1955-2015)

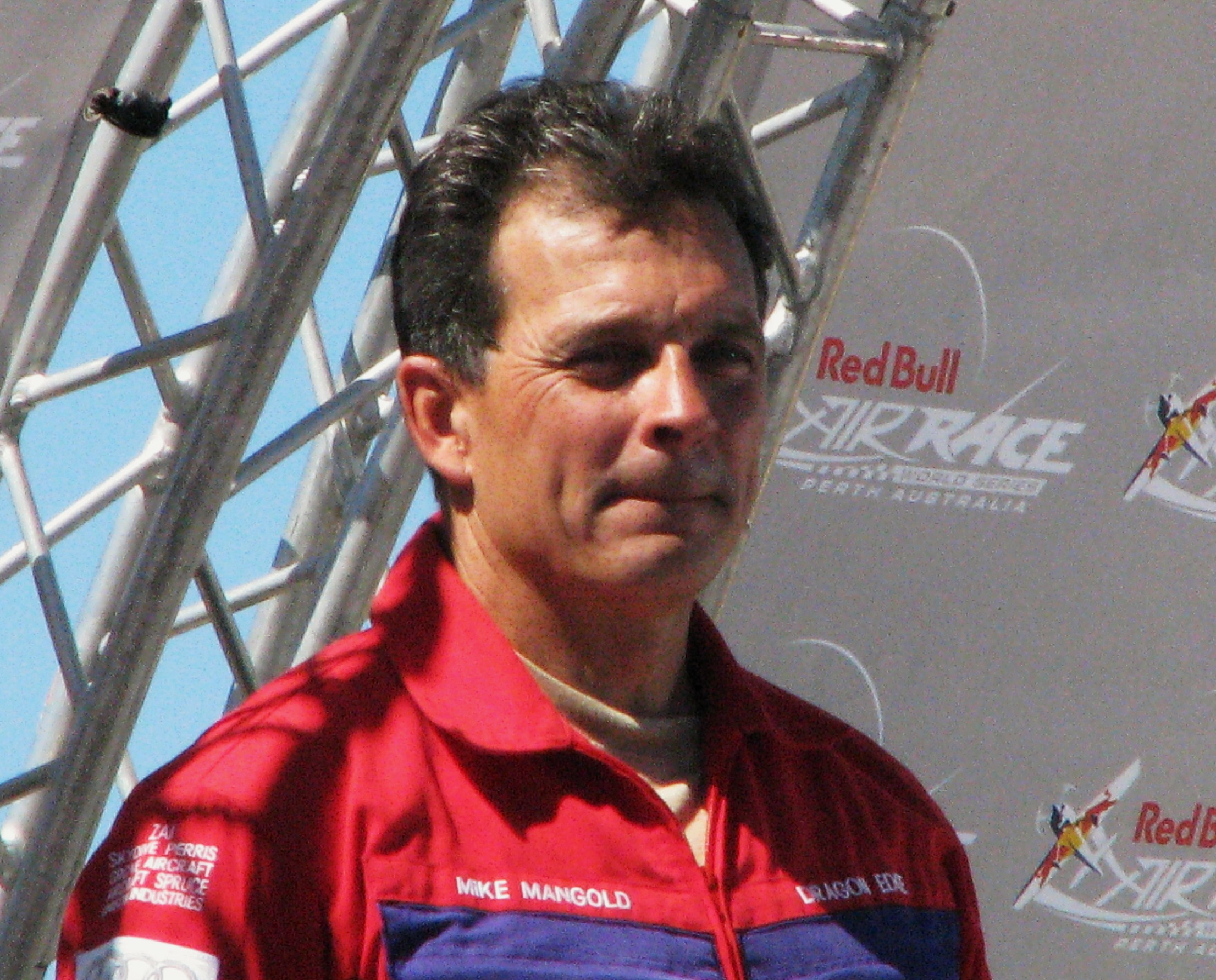
- Mangold receiving World Championship in Perth, 2007
- Born: Michael Eugene Mangold; October 10, 1955; Cincinnati, Ohio, U.S.
- Died: December 6, 2015 (aged 60); Apple Valley, California, U.S.
- Education: United States Air Force Academy, B.S. 1978
- Spouse: Julie Mangold
- Aviation career

Racing career
- First race: 2004
- Best position: 1st (2005 & 2007)
- Aircraft: Zivko Edge 540, Viper L-29, L-39

Michael Eugene Mangold (October 10, 1955 – December 6, 2015) was an American aviator whose career spanned the United States Air Force, commercial airlines, and aerobatics. Mangold competed in the Red Bull Air Race World Series from 2004 through 2009, where he repeatedly placed first and won the World Championship in the 2005 World Series, as well as the 2007 World Series. His nickname and call sign in the military was "Mongo".

== Biography ==
=== Early life ===
Mangold was born in Cincinnati, Ohio, and was the oldest of three children. He moved to California at 3 years old and then to Pennsylvania for his high school years.

=== Career ===
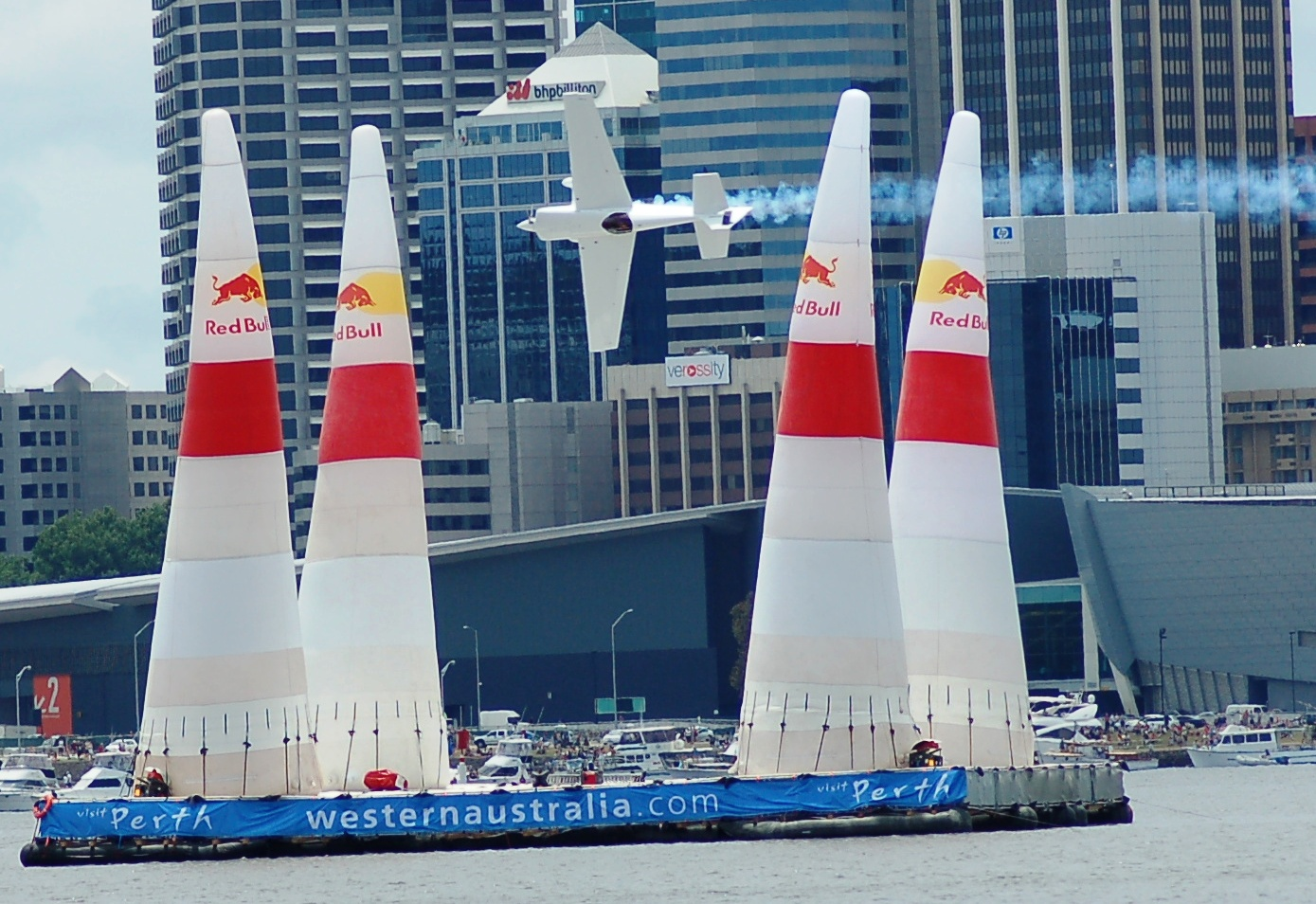
Mangold racing in Perth during the 2006 series.

Mangold began his aviation career in 1974 as a skydiver while attending the United States Air Force Academy. He went on to USAF pilot training in 1977 and learned to fly fighters, graduating from the academy the following year with a B.S. degree, and eventually attending the United States Air Force Fighter Weapons School. Mangold graduated first in his class in 1983 and earned the "Outstanding Graduate" award. During his military career, Mangold served in the Pacific and CONUS theaters, flying nuclear, conventional, smart weapons, and air intercept missions in the F-4 Phantom, including the F-4G Wild Weasel variant. He flew Phantoms for the USAF for about 10 years. After leaving active duty in 1989, he became a commercial airline pilot for US Airways and then American Airlines, flying a variety of jetliners, including the Boeing 767.

Although Mangold was a jet pilot, he continued to enjoy skydiving. He was a member of the U.S. Parachute Team from 1981 to 1985 and won multiple national awards as a skydiver. He participated in a record-setting formation skydive in Anapa, Russia in 1996 as one of 296 parachutists.

Mangold started his competitive aerobatic and air show career in 1990, flying a Super Decathlon. He went on to win medals at the U.S. National Aerobatic Championship, as well as the L. Paul Soucy Award from the International Aerobatic Club in 2002 as the highest-scoring unlimited pilot of the year. He first participated in the Red Bull Air Race in 2004 and raced in the competition until 2009, winning the World Series in 2005 and 2007.

In 2010, Mangold retired from active Red Bull Air Racing, and became the RBAR rookie (Challenger) coach, as well as an air race commentator, including for FOX Sports. He served for four years as president of the Racing Jets International board of directors, presiding over the Reno Air Race until 2013. Mangold also sat on the board of directors for the Classic Jet Aircraft Association.

=== Death ===
Mangold died on December 6, 2015, in an air crash. His Aero L-39 Albatross crashed due to engine failure and exploded shortly after takeoff at about 2:20 p.m. from Apple Valley Airport, California, killing Mangold and one other person on board Geza Decsy. He was survived by his wife Julie, also an aerobatic pilot, and their children Nick and Melissa.

== Career results ==
=== Red Bull Air Race ===
(key)

Year	1	2	3	4	5	6	7	8	9	10	11	12	Rank	Points
2004	(United Kingdom); RAF	(Hungary); DAN	(United States); RNO; 1										5th	1
2005	(United Arab Emirates); MZA; 3	(Netherlands); ERA; 1	(Austria); ZLT; 1	(Republic of Ireland); CAS; 5	(United Kingdom); LNG; 1	(Hungary); DAN; 1	(United States); SAF; 1						1st	36
2006	(United Arab Emirates); MZA; 2	(Spain); BAR; 2	(Germany); BER; 3	(Russia); SPE; C	(Turkey); GHO; 4	(Hungary); DAN; 3	(United Kingdom); LNG; 4	(United States); SAF; 4	(Australia); SWR; 4				3rd	30
2007	(United Arab Emirates); MZA; 2	(Brazil); BOT; 3	(United States); MON; 3	(Turkey); GHO; 1	(Spain); BAR; C	(Switzerland); INT; 2	(United Kingdom); THA; 1	(Hungary); DAN; 1	(Portugal); DOU; 2	(United States); SDE; 5	(Mexico); ACA; C	(Australia); SWR; 3	1st	47
2008	(United Arab Emirates); MZA; 3	(United States); SDE; 2	(United States); DET; 4	(Sweden); STO; C	(Netherlands); ERA; 5	(United Kingdom); THA; 6	(Hungary); DAN; 4	(Portugal); DOU; 3	(Spain); BAR; C	(Australia); SWR; 9			4th	44

Sporting positions
Preceded by Kirby Chambliss	Red Bull Air Race World Series Champion; 2005	Succeeded by Kirby Chambliss
Preceded by Kirby Chambliss	Red Bull Air Race World Series Champion; 2007	Succeeded by Hannes Arch
