= Zivko Aeronautics =

American aeronautics manufacturer

- Headquarters: Guthrie, United States
- Website: zivko.com

Zivko Aeronautics Inc. is an aeronautics manufacturer specializing in composite prototyping and design for aviation. The company was founded in 1987 by William and Judith Zivko and is located at the Guthrie–Edmond Regional Airport northeast of Oklahoma City.

Zivko is best known for its Zivko Edge 540 aerobatic aircraft. It also designs and manufactures a variety of housings for use in a range of aviation-related areas and provide design, fabrication and other services.
