= List of awards and nominations received by Ziana Zain =

Ziana Zain awards and nominations
Awards and nominations
Award	Wins	Nominations

Totals (Note: Certain award groups do not simply award one winner. They acknowledge several different recipients, have runners-up, and have third place. Since this is a specific recognition and is different from losing an award, runner-up mentions are considered wins in this award tally. For simplification and to avoid errors, each award in this list has been presumed to have had a prior nomination.)
- Wins: 30
- Nominations: 59

A list of awards and nominations received by Ziana Zain.

== Awards: Local & International ==
=== 1984 ===
- Bintang Selangor Singing Competition
  - Winner of Bintang Selangor

=== 1994 ===
- Malaysia's Popular Star Awards (Anugerah Bintang Popular)
  - Most Popular Supporting Actress

=== 1995 ===
- Voice of Asia, Almathy, Kazakhstan
  - Main Award of Voice of Asia.
- Malaysia's Popular Star Awards (Anugerah Bintang Popular)
  - Most Popular Artiste
  - Most Popular Female Singer
  - Most Popular Supporting Actress
  - Most Popular TV Entertainer
- Music Industry Awards (Anugerah Industri Muzik)
  - Best Vocal Performance in an Album (Female) - Setia Ku Di Sini

=== 1996 ===
- Tokyo Music Festival, Tokyo, Japan
  - Golden Voice Awards, Gold Medal (Anggapanmu)
- Singapore Music Award, Singapore
  - Most Popular Female Singer
  - Most Popular Song - Korban Cinta
- Malaysia's Popular Star Awards (Anugerah Bintang Popular)
  - Most Popular Film Actress
- Entertainment Media Award (Anugerah Media Hiburan)
  - Sexiest Female Artiste
- Nescafe's 10 hits Awards (Pujaan 10 Nescafe)
  - Best Solo Performance - Bersama Akhirnya
- Screen Film Awards (Anugerah Skrin)
  - Best Supporting Actress

=== 1997 ===
- Nescafe's 10 hits Awards (Pujaan 10 Nescafe)
  - Best Solo Performance - Korban Cinta
- Screen Film Awards (Anugerah Skrin)
  - Best Actress - Merah
- Malaysian Film Festival (FFM)
  - Best Actress - Merah
- Music Industry Awards (Anugerah Industri Muzik)
  - Best Pop Album - Puncak Kasih

=== 1998 ===
- Malaysia's Popular Star Awards (Anugerah Bintang Popular)
  - Most Popular Film Actress
- Entertainment Media Award (Anugerah Media Hiburan)
  - Most Beautiful Artiste
- Malaysian Songs Championship Awards (Anugerah Juara Lagu)
  - Best Ballad - Puncak Kasih
- Malaysia Music Video Awards (Anugerah Video Muzik Malaysia)
  - Best Music Video - Puncak Kasih

=== 2000 ===
- Entertainment Media Award (Anugerah Media Hiburan)
  - Best Cover Magazine

=== 2002 ===
- Singapore Prime Festival, Singapore
  - Best Entertainment Show - Bersama Ziana
- Malaysian Songs Championship Awards (Anugerah Juara Lagu)
  - Best Ballad - Menadah Gerimis

=== 2003 ===
- ERA's Award
  - Choice Pop Song - Lembah Asmara

=== 2004 ===
- ERA's Award
  - Choice Pop Song - Bukan
- Malaysia's Popular Star Awards (Anugerah Bintang Popular)
  - Best Dressed: Anugerah Bintang Popular
- URS Glamor Award (Anugerah URS Glamor)
  - Best Idol Of The Decade

=== 2010 ===
- Mentor 4 Song Competition
  - Champion
- Awarded Pingat Jasa Bakti Seniman by Yayasan Insan Melaka (YIM)

== Local & International Recognitions ==
=== 1992 ===
- Represent Malaysia in Asian Voices project.
- Awarded Gold Disc for album Madah Berhelah by RIM (40 000 copies)

=== 1993 ===
- Represent Malaysia in Asian Pop Queen Festival, Fukuoka & Hiroshima, Japan.
- Recorded 2 songs in Colors of Love album together with 5 best Asian singers.
  - Groove me duet with Jo Awayan
  - Feel Me Out
- Awarded Platinum Disc for album Ziana Zain by RIM (60 000 copies)

=== 1995 ===
- Listed in Malaysian Book Of Records as the First Female Artist to Win International Competition
- Represent Malaysia in musical concert Asia Live aired by Japan's NHK satellite TV Channel Two.
- Duet with Indonesia Pop Diva, Dessy Fitri in the song Cinta di akhir garisan during Anugerah Industri Muzik
- Awarded 3× Platinum Disc for album Setiaku Di Sini by RIM (180 000 copies)

=== 1996 ===
- Bestowed the Bintang Perkhidmatan Cemerlang by Sultan of Selangor
- Recorded 2 songs in A Musical Salute to Disney album
  - A Whole New World
  - The Beauty and The Beast
- Duet with Indonesia Great Maestro, Late Broery Marantika with the song Dekat Tapi Jauh in Ziana Zain Unplugged Concert
- Represent Malaysia in musical special The Big Show held in Singapore
- Awarded Platinum Disc for album Ziana Zain Unplugged by RIM (80 000 copies)
- Awarded Arts and Cultural Leader by Majlis Belia Selangor

=== 1997 ===
- Represent Malaysia in Konsert Senandung Serumpun, Indonesia
- Invited together with 15 Asian and International celebrities to Omega International Celebrity Club at Crans Montana, an exclusive ski and golf resort in Switzerland.
- Represent Malaysian in Asian Music Scene 1997 that been held in Putra World Trade Centre, Kuala Lumpur
- Awarded 3× Platinum Disc for album Puncak Kasih by RIM (150 000 copies)

=== 1998 ===
- Awarded 3× Platinum for album Best of Ziana Zain by RIM (100 000 copies)

=== 1999 ===
- Awarded Platinum Disc for album Ziana Zain 99 by RIM (50 000 copies)

=== 2001 ===
- Awarded Bintang Cemerlang Melaka by TYT Melaka.

=== 2002 ===
- Invited to St Moritz, Switzerland as an appreciation for her sixth years as Omega ambassador
- Invited to perform in Dazzling Asian Divas Gala Ball, Singapore
- Invited to the launching of OMEGA Seamaster Aqua Terra Raffles Marina that held in Singapore
- Perform live at Jerudong Park Amphitheatre, Brunei in Ziana Zain Unplugged Concert 2002, the same place where Michael Jackson ever performed
- Awarded Platinum Disc for album Aku Cintakan Mu by RIM (45 000 copies)

=== 2003 ===
- Ziana was brought to Auckland, New Zealand for Omega Seamaster launching
- Listed as The Most Glamorous Celebrity by GLAM Magazine.

=== 2004 ===
- Invited to the launching of OMEGA Bijoux collection at Singapore with Anna Kournikova
- Represent Malaysia in Konsert Serumpun Budaya, in Indonesia
- Listed as The Most Glamorous Celebrity by GLAM Magazine.

=== 2005 ===
- Awarded Pingat Setia Ahmad Shah (SAP) From Sultan of Pahang.
- Listed as The Most Glamorous Celebrity by GLAM Magazine.

=== 2007 ===
- Ziana Zain the only Malaysian artist been invited to FENDI's Summer Collection Fashion Show in Great Wall of China, Beijing
- Her cover on InTrend Magazine had won Pre-Printing Excellence Award in 4th Asian print Awards Shanghai, China

=== 2010 ===
- Invited by Louis Vuitton to Australia for photo-shoot with LV's products.

=== 2011 ===
- Listed as Top 10 Fastest Trend Worldwide at Twitter.
- Listed as Top 8 Best Asia Angel Voice by One of the Famous Thailand's Blog.
- Listed as No 6 for Hot Asian Mom by Lori Boyd from manmade website.

== Nomination & Finalist ==
=== Malaysia ===
- Malaysian Song Competition Awards (Anugerah Juara Lagu)
  - Finalist - Madah Berhelah (1992) - Ballad
  - Finalist - Kemelut Di Muara Kasih (1996) - Ballad
  - Finalist - Kalau Mencari Teman (1997) - Ethnic Creative
  - Finalist - Senja Nan Merah - duet with Awie (1997) - Ballad
  - Finalist - Syurga Di Hati Kita (1999)- Ballad
  - Finalist - Dingin (2008) - Ballad
- Music Industry Awards (Anugerah Industri Muzik)
  - Nominated Best Vocal Performance in an Album (Female) - Ziana Zain (1993)
  - Nominated Best Album Cover Design - Setiaku Di Sini (1995)
  - Nominated Best Pop Album - Setia Ku Di Sini (1995)
  - Nominated Best Vocal Performance in an Album (Female) - Live MTV Unplugged (1996)
  - Nominated Best Vocal Performance in an Album (Female) - Puncak Kasih (1997)
  - Nominated Song Of The Year - Puncak Kasih (1997)
  - Nominated Album Of The Year - Puncak Kasih (1997)
  - Nominated Best Vocal Performance in an Album (Female) - Ziana Zain (1999)
  - Nominated Song Of The Year - Pusaka Rimba with Dayang Nurfaizah (1999)
  - Nominated Best Vocal Performance in an Album (Female) - Aku Cintakan Mu (2001)
  - Nominated Best Pop Album - Aku Cintakan Mu (2001)
  - Nominated Best Vocal Performance in an Album (Female) - No.1's live (2004)
  - Nominated Best Pop Song - Dingin (2009)
- Malaysian Film Festival (Festival Filem Malaysia)
  - Nominated - Best Actress - Merah (1997)
  - Nominated - Best Supporting Actress - Maria Mariana (1997)
  - Nominated - Best Supporting Actress - Magika (2010)
- Entertainment Media Awards
  - Nominated - Sensational Female Singer (2002)
  - Nominated - Sensational Female Singer (2003/2004)
  - Nominated - Sexiest Female Artist (2002)
  - Nominated - Sexiest Female Artist (2003/2004)

=== Singapore ===
- Planet Music Award
  - Nominated - Best Song - Menadah Gerimis (2002)
  - Nominated - Best Album - Aku Cintakan Mu (2002)
- Mtv Asia Award
  - Nominated - Favorite Female Singer in Malaysia (2002)

== Other contributions ==
- Recorded theme song for 15th Southeast Asian (SEA) Games in 1989
  - Lukisan Wajah Kasih
- Recorded theme song of 16th Commonwealth Gamesin 1998
  - Strive for the Best
- Performed during opening of XIII Malaysian Games (SUKMA) in 2010
