= Ratu (disambiguation) =

Ratu usually refers to a title used by Fijians of chiefly rank, and also to Javanese word to refer the leaders, especially kings or nobles. Ratu is also a word from Indonesian language which means "queen". Also Balinese ratu ‘king’, Wayan rātū ‘head of a clan, the title given to one who has been installed as chief’, Samoan lātū ‘person in charge of an undertaking, e.g. a party of builders, or, in the case of women, a weaving bee’. Most reflexes of *datu in the Philippines and western Indonesia contain a vocative marker *-q (Blust 1979).

Ratu may also refer to:

== People ==
- Michael Ratu, a professional rugby league footballer who plays for Leeds Rhinos
- Pangeran Ratu, the ruler of Banten in Northwest Java, Indonesia
- Ratu Nasiganiyavi, an Australian winger for the NSW Waratahs rugby union club
- Ratu Bagus, a guru

== Places ==
- Ratu Agung, a district in Bengkulu, Indonesia
- Labuhan Ratu, a district in Lampung Province, Indonesia
- Pelabuhan Ratu, an isolated fishing village at the south coast of West Java
- Ratu block, one of the twenty administrative blocks of Ranchi district, Jharkhand state, India
- Ratu, Ranchi, census town in Ranchi district, Jharkhand, India
- Ratu Boko, an archaeological site in Java
- Ratu Cakobau Park, a rugby union stadium in Nausori, Fiji
- Ratu Plaza, a shopping mall located in Central Jakarta, Indonesia
- Ratu, a village in Nepal
- Râtu River, another name for the Hopârta River in Romania

== Other ==
- Ratu (band), an Indonesian female duo formed in 1999 and disbanded in 2007
- Ratu - Satu Penghargaan, a greatest hits album by Malaysian singer Ziana Zain
- Ratu Kadavulevu School, a school in Lodoni, Fiji
