= Ziana Zain (1993 album) =

1993 studio album by Ziana Zain

- Standard cover

Studio album by Ziana Zain
- Released: April 12, 1993
- Recorded: November 1992 – March 1993
- Studios: Digitron; Trax; Artcell; Luncai Emas, Studio R. Ronggeng
- Genres: pop; ballad
- Length: 40:34
- Label: BMG
- Producers: Zuriani; M. Nasir; Saari Amri; Anuar

Ziana Zain chronology
| Madah Berhelah (1991) | Ziana Zain (1993) | Setia Ku Di Sini (1995) |

Singles from Ziana Zain
- 1. "Anggapan Mu" Released: February 8, 1993; 2. "Putus Terpaksa" Released: April 12, 1993; 3. "Mimpi Mu Bukan Mimpi Ku" Released: July 5, 1993; 4. "Kasih Ku Pertahankan" Released: September 13, 1993; 5. "Rindu Yang Ku Pendam" Released: October 25, 1993; 6. "Ku Cinta Pada Mu" Released: February 28, 1994

Ziana Zain is the second studio album by Malaysian singer Ziana Zain, released on April 12, 1993, by BMG Pacific. The album was produced by Zuriani, M. Nasir, Saari Amri, and Anuar. It reached numbers one in Malaysia, where it was certified Platinum for shipments of over fifty thousand copies. At the 1st Anugerah Industri Muzik, Ziana Zain was nominated for the Best Vocal Performance (Female).

The first single, "Anggapan Mu" topping the Carta Muzik-Muzik and many radio charts in Malaysia. The second single, "Putus Terpaksa", also topped Carta Muzik-Muzik, but it received mixed reviews with critics panning its high pitch structure as well as its lyrics which were rumoured to portray a girl falling in love with a drug addict. Both singles were shortlisted in the semi-final of 1993's Anugerah Juara Lagu, but neither of the songs made it to the final round.

Ziana Zain has been certified Platinum by the RIM for selling 85,000 copies.

== Commercial performance ==
The album has sold over fifty thousand copies in the first five months. As of September 2003, Ziana Zain has sold 95,000 copies in the Malaysia. It was certified Platinum in the Malaysia and reached number 1 on the TELE-SKOP Chart. Ziana's popularity was also showing in Indonesia where the album topped the chart in ASIRI for two weeks, peaked at number three on the Indonesia Albums Chart and was certified Platinum for fifteen thousand copies sold.

The most successful single from the album was "Putus Terpaksa" which peaked at number one on the Muzik-Muzik Chart. Other singles, which reached the Muzik-Muzik top 10 included: "Anggapan Mu" (number two), "Mimpi Mu Bukan Mimpi Ku" (number six) and "Kasih Ku Pertahankan" (number three).

== Accolades ==
| Year | Award | Category | Result | Ref. |
|---|---|---|---|---|
| 1993 | 1st Anugerah Industri Muzik | Best Vocal Performance (Female) | Nominated | |

== Track listing ==
Ziana Zain – Standard edition
| No. | Title | Writer(s) | Composer(s) | Length |
|---|---|---|---|---|
| 1. | "Putus Terpaksa" | Saari Amri | Saari Amri | 5:10 |
| 2. | "Mimpi Mu Bukan Mimpi Ku" | Nanee | Zuriani | 4:43 |
| 3. | "Hadir Mu" (featuring Izzaka) | Nanee | Eros Ramazzotti | 4:45 |
| 4. | "Kaulah Penentunya" | Saari Amri | Saari Amri | 3:43 |
| 5. | "Rindu Yang Ku Pendam" | Bob Lokman | M. Nasir | 5:42 |
| 6. | "Kasih Ku Pertahankan" | Azam Dungun | Anuar | 5:14 |
| 7. | "Ku Cinta Pada Mu" | Nanee | Zuriani | 4:10 |
| 8. | "Anggapan Mu" | Asmin Mudin | Asmin Mudin | 4:35 |
| 9. | "Disini Selamanya" | Nanee | Zuriani | 4:15 |
| 10. | "Chitose-Bashi" | Kenji Kadoya | Mieko Nishijima | 5:42 |
| Total length: | | | | 45:99 |

== Personnel ==
Adapted from album liner notes.

Vocal credits

- Ziana Zain – lead vocals
- Izzaka – featured artist
- Zuriani – background vocals
- Nanee – background vocals
- Ramlah – background vocals

Managerial and creative

- Shahlan – A&R coordinator
- Hamid – A&R
- Aziz Bakar – executive producer
- Jessica Severn – album design
- Nanee – management
- Sports Ads – photographer
- Ritta – marketing manager
- Azhar – marketing manager
- Anna – marketing manager
- Harry – marketing manager
- Rosmawati – marketing manager

Technical

- Zuriani – producer, keyboards, programmer, arrangement
- M. Nasir – producer, mastering
- Anuar – producer, arrangement
- Saari Amri – producer
- Derek – mastering
- Lan – mastering
- Dot – mastering
- Brian – mastering
- Wan – mastering
- Studio R. Ronggeng – mastering
- Bullet – drums, mastering
- Mano – drums
- Razak Rahman – saxophone
- Jose Thomas – guitar
- Simon – guitar
- Aznan – guitar
- Mus – guitar
- Samad – guitar
- Hillary Ang – acoustic guitar
- Rafi – acoustic guitar
- Mohar – flute
- Firdaus – keyboards
- Salman – bass

== Charts ==
=== Singles ===
| Title | Year | Peak chart positions | | | | | | | | | |
| Title | Year | Radio 1 | Muzik | Ria | Gegar | Hitz | Era | Suria | Suria | Hot | Muzik Muzik |
|---|---|---|---|---|---|---|---|---|---|---|---|
| Anggapan Mu | 1993 | 2 | 1 | 3 | — | — | — | — | — | — | 2 |
| Putus Terpaksa | 1993 | 2 | 2 | 5 | — | — | — | — | — | — | 1 |
| Mimpi Mu Bukan Mimpi Ku | 1993 | — | 7 | 10 | — | — | — | — | — | — | 6 |
| Kasih Ku Pertahankan | 1993 | 3 | 3 | 8 | — | — | — | — | — | — | 3 |
| Rindu Yang Ku Pendam | 1993 | — | — | — | — | — | — | — | — | — | — |
| Ku Cinta Pada Mu | 1994 | — | — | — | — | — | — | — | — | — | 8 |

== Certifications and sales ==
Certifications for Ziana Zain, with pure sales where available
| Region | Certification | Sales | Ref. |
|---|---|---|---|
| Malaysia (RIM) | Platinum | 95,000 | |

== Release history ==
Ziana Zain release history
| Region | Date | Format(s) | Edition(s) | Label(s) | Ref. |
|---|---|---|---|---|---|
| Malaysia | April 12, 1993 | CD; cassette | Standard | BMG Pacific | |
| Indonesia | May 17, 1993 | CD; cassette | Standard | BMG Pacific | |
| Various | January 2013 | streaming; digital download | Standard | Sony | |
