= Phoenix Bangkit =

Studio album by M. Nasir
- Released: 12 June 2001
- Recorded: 1999–2001
- Studios: Studio Ronggeng (Paya Jaras, Sungai Buloh, Selangor)
- Genres: Ballad; Nusantara
- Length: 54:00
- Label: Warner Music Malaysia
- Producers: M. Nasir; Aznan Alias; Tony Alberto; Nasser Abu Kasim; Rudy Ramawy

M. Nasir chronology
Srikandi Cintaku (1999)	Phoenix Bangkit (2001)	Sang Pencinta (2006)

Phoenix Bangkit (Phoenix Rises) is the sixth studio album by Malaysian singer-songwriter, M. Nasir, released on 12 June 2001 by Warner Music Malaysia. The album, which has an Arabic influence and features the story of an Asian mythical bird as its main theme, was well-received.

== Production ==
Phoenix Bangkit was heavily influenced by M. Nasir. The album took two years to completed and recorded primarily at Studio Ronggeng, Luncai Emas in Paya Jaras, Sungai Buloh, Selangor. For the album, he took Middle Eastern and Chinese folklore about the Phoenix bird which has a long lifespan. According to the myth, after the bird died, it rose to ashes, then became a kind of caterpillar before rising again as a stronger and more glorious bird. In an interview with Utusan Malaysia, M. Nasir said Phoenix Bangkit based on his accord to diversify nusantara-oriented songs, he said: "After produced the album Canggung Mendonan about seven years ago, I've been thinking about doing something for the next album".

The album also contains Arabic influences, in which Nasir in an interview with Harian Metro: "This album still doesn't run away from my hopes and ambitions of wanting to make an album in the form of oriental dance". According to him, most of the songs in Phoenix Bangkit were recorded in 1997, but were given new arrangements. He contributed six out of the 10 lyrics in the album, while the remaining lyrics were written by Loloq, S. Amin Shahab and Seth. The album was recorded with Nasir provided vocals and plays harmonium and percussion. He is joined by other musicians such as Ramli M.S. on accordion, Jay Jay on bass, Lian Phooi Woo on cello, Zul Mahat on keyboards, Eddie Marzuki on mandolin, Gary Gideon on drums and Mohar on flute. Six musicians plays violin on the album, including Ahmad Razli Ayub and Helena Ong. Bob Lokman, Sabri Yunus, Ya Daud and Tok Mat Sungai Congkak as well as Nasir's wife Marlia Musa and his sons Hidayat and Shafi'i provided guest vocals. Syed Arab, Eija Nor, Juanita Ismail, Rohimi Sobeng, Tam Spider and Usop Kopratasa were hired to provided backing vocals.

The album was produced by M. Nasir with Nasser Abu Kassim and Rudy Ramawy serves as the executive producers. The album was also mixed by Roslan Aziz, Ahmad Zairi Ariffin, Greg Henderson and Mohd Hafiz with mastering process done by CL Toh at the Masering One. Phoenix Bangkit is the first album M. Nasir recorded and released with Warner Music Malaysia following the expiration of his contract with BMG Music Malaysia in early 2000. The cover art was designed by Malaysian painter and illustrator Mohd Foad Hassan with photography was taken by Malaysian photographer Din Arshad.

== Style ==
Phoenix Bangkit has a music and lyric concept that interconnected each other. According to Nasir, the album's songs gave a stylistic creation towards the melody which synonymous with Nusantara Malays and instilled with Middle East musical elements.

=== Lyrical themes ===
The lyrics are conveyed with symbolism and feature historical icons from well-known Middle Eastern civilizations. "Hijab Kekasih", the last track in Phoenix Bangkit, revolves around the final vision of a lover towards his beloved, telling him not to look for anyone else because he was created for her. "Masirah" also reveals the spirit of the Palestinian people's struggle against the greed of the Zionist regime. The song begins with a quote from French poetry, then is set to indigenous Palestinian music, and ends with prayers and hope in Arabic. "Raikan Cinta", the album's main single, is about the journey of Siti Hajar and Prophet Ismail in the dry sands of the Arabian Peninsula.

== Release and promotion ==
Phoenix Bangkit was released on 12 June 2001. It was well received, selling 35,000 copies and spawned three singles: "Raikan Cinta", "Masirah" and "Phoenix Bangkit Dari Abu". The album won 4 out of 9 nominations at the 9th edition of Anugerah Industri Muzik and won the Best Album at the 2002 Anugerah Planet Muzik.

To promote the album, M. Nasir headlined the Konsert Phoenix Bangkit, initially to be held on 5 October 2001 in Suntex City, Singapore, but was held on 21 October due to his health problem. In the concert, he performed songs from Phoenix Bangkit. The concert was attended by 3,000 audiences.

== Critical reception ==
Upon release, Phoenix Bangkit received generally positive reviews from music critics, who praised the production. Utusan Malaysia's Ku Seman Ku Hussain noted that the album is "the superior work from M. Nasir and is an interpretation of cultural continuity between the Nusantara and the Middle East". Huzz, also from the same publication, gave five star rating in A grade list for the album. Writing for Berita Harian, Roslen Fadzil highlighted Phoenix Bangkit as a "world-class" and "should really be placed next to other albums on the shelves of world music artists in entertainment stores".

== Track listing ==
All tracks are written by M. Nasir except where noted.

No.	Title	Writer(s)	Length
1.	"Raikan Cinta"		5:15
2.	"Masirah"	M. Nasir, S. Amin Shahab	5:04
3.	"Sahabat Gua"		5:50
4.	"Phoenix Bangkit Dari Abu"		5:24
5.	"Bila Rumi Menari"		5:42
6.	"Dah Lagu Tu!"		4:24
7.	"Melawan Arus"		5:43
8.	"Langgam Pak Dogo"	M. Nasir, Loloq	6:23
9.	"Oh! ... Anak"	M. Nasir, Loloq	4:07
10.	"Hijab Kekasih"	M. Nasir, Seth	6:04
Total length:			54:00
