= 2014 Red Bull Air Race World Championship =

Seasons
- ← 2010 2015 →

The 2014 Red Bull Air Race World Championship was the ninth season of Red Bull Air Race World Championship, and the first since 2010.

In his seventh season in the series, British pilot Nigel Lamb became the champion for the first time, with consistent finishing being the key to his championship success. After starting the season slowly with just five points from the opening two events, Lamb won his first Air Race competition at Putrajaya Lake in Malaysia, before reeling off five consecutive second-place finishes. These results were good enough for him to surpass former champions Hannes Arch and Paul Bonhomme in the standings; Lamb ultimately finished nine points clear of Arch, with Bonhomme a further two points in arrears. Both pilots won two races during the season, as Arch won at Rovinj, Croatia and at Gdynia in Poland, while Bonhomme won in Abu Dhabi and his home event, at Ascot Racecourse. Nicolas Ivanoff was another two-time event winner, winning at Texas Motor Speedway and the Red Bull Ring, with Pete McLeod winning the remaining event, at Las Vegas Motor Speedway.

The series also introduced a Challenger Cup for the 2014 season, for young pilots to develop their skills. Each pilot entered at least three races in order to accrue points towards the Cup rankings, with the top six pilots after the Las Vegas event being invited to a winner-takes-all event at the Red Bull Ring. Petr Kopfstein won the race by 1.1 seconds over Halim Othman, to take the inaugural title.

Starting in 2014 it was sanctioned by the Fédération Aéronautique Internationale (FAI) as an official motorsport, meaning provision of FAI medals especially designed for the Red Bull Air Race, the inclusion of all races in the FAI Events Calendar, and the official approval by the FAI of the race Rules & Regulations. Also, the FAI provided a safety delegate who attended all events to supervise safety aspects.

== Aircraft and pilots ==
=== Master Class ===
No.	Pilot	Aircraft	Rounds
22	(Austria) Hannes Arch	Zivko Edge 540	All
91	(Hungary) Péter Besenyei	Corvus Racer 540	All
55	(United Kingdom) Paul Bonhomme	Zivko Edge 540	All
10	(United States) Kirby Chambliss	Zivko Edge 540	All
21	(Germany) Matthias Dolderer	Zivko Edge 540	All
95	(Australia) Matt Hall	MX Aircraft MXS	All
27	(France) Nicolas Ivanoff	Zivko Edge 540	All
9	(United Kingdom) Nigel Lamb	MX Aircraft MXS	All
84	(Canada) Pete McLeod	Zivko Edge 540	All
99	(United States) Michael Goulian	Zivko Edge 540	All
8	(Czech Republic) Martin Šonka	Zivko Edge 540	All
31	(Japan) Yoshihide Muroya	Zivko Edge 540	All

=== Challenger Class ===
- All Challenger Cup Pilots used an Extra 330LX.

No.	Pilot	Rounds
7	(United Kingdom) Tom Bennett	1–2, 4–5, 8
5	(Chile) Cristian Bolton	4–6
11	(France) Mikaël Brageot	1–2, 6–8
6	(Poland) Luke Czepiela	2, 4–5, 7
18	(Czech Republic) Petr Kopfstein	1, 3–4, 7–8
35	(France) François Le Vot	1–3, 7–8
88	(Malaysia) Halim Othman	3, 5, 7–8
25	(Slovenia) Peter Podlunšek	2–3, 5–6
17	(Sweden) Daniel Ryfa	1, 3–4, 6, 8
23	(Germany) Claudius Spiegel	2, 4–5
26	(Spain) Juan Velarde	1, 3, 6–7

- Three new pilots (Bolton, Czepiela and Othman) earned race wings and officially joined the Challenger Class on April 5, 2014, after they surpassed rigorous training and testing which took place at the Red Bull Air Race Qualification Camp in Murska Sobota, Slovenia.

== Race calendar and results ==
The eight-event calendar for the 2014 season. An updated race calendar was released on 15 July, with the scheduled Chinese round being replaced by a round at the Red Bull Ring in Spielberg, Austria.

Round	Country	Location	Date	Fastest Qualifying	Winning Pilot	Winning Aircraft	Winning Challenger	Report
1	United Arab Emirates	Abu Dhabi	28 February – 1 March	(Canada) Pete McLeod	(United Kingdom) Paul Bonhomme	Zivko Edge 540	(France) François Le Vot	report
2	Croatia	Rovinj	12–13 April	(Austria) Hannes Arch	(Austria) Hannes Arch	Zivko Edge 540	(France) François Le Vot	report
3	Malaysia	Putrajaya Lake, Putrajaya	17–18 May	(Austria) Hannes Arch	(United Kingdom) Nigel Lamb	MX Aircraft MXS	(France) François Le Vot	report
4	Poland	Gdynia	26–27 July	(United Kingdom) Paul Bonhomme	(Austria) Hannes Arch	Zivko Edge 540	(Germany) Claudius Spiegel	report
5	United Kingdom	Ascot Racecourse, Ascot	16–17 August	(Canada) Pete McLeod	(United Kingdom) Paul Bonhomme	Zivko Edge 540	(Malaysia) Halim Othman	report
6	United States	Texas Motor Speedway, Fort Worth	6–7 September	(Canada) Pete McLeod	(France) Nicolas Ivanoff	Zivko Edge 540	(France) Mikaël Brageot	report
7	United States	Las Vegas Motor Speedway, Las Vegas	11–12 October	(Canada) Pete McLeod	(Canada) Pete McLeod (Note: Race day abandoned due to bad weather. The results for the event were determined via qualifying order.)	Zivko Edge 540	(Malaysia) Halim Othman	report
8	Austria	Red Bull Ring	25–26 October	(Austria) Hannes Arch	(France) Nicolas Ivanoff	Zivko Edge 540	(Czech Republic) Petr Kopfstein	report

== Championship standings ==
=== Master Class ===
Master Class scoring system

Position	**1st**	**2nd**	**3rd**	**4th**	**5th**	**6th**	**7th**	**8th**	**9–12th**
Points	12	9	7	5	4	3	2	1	0

Pos.	Pilot	UAE (United Arab Emirates)	CRO (Croatia)	MYS (Malaysia)	POL (Poland)	GBR (United Kingdom)	USA1 (United States)	USA2 (United States)	AUT (Austria)	Points
1	(United Kingdom) Nigel Lamb	5	8	1	2	2	2	2	2	62
2	(Austria) Hannes Arch	2	**1**	**2**	1	8	8	5	**4**	53
3	(United Kingdom) Paul Bonhomme	1	2	5	**5**	1	5	7	5	51
4	(France) Nicolas Ivanoff	8	5	11	6	3	1	6	1	42
5	(Canada) Pete McLeod	**3**	4	4	8	**11**	**3**	**1**	8	38
6	(Australia) Matt Hall	4	7	3	3	5	6	4	10	33
7	(Germany) Matthias Dolderer	6	9	8	11	4	4	3	11	21
8	(Czech Republic) Martin Šonka	7	6	6	10	9	7	8	3	18
9	(Japan) Yoshihide Muroya	9	3	10	12	6	9	9	9	10
10	(United States) Kirby Chambliss	11	10	9	4	10	10	11	7	7
11	(Hungary) Péter Besenyei	10	11	7	7	7	12	12	12	6
12	(United States) Michael Goulian	DNS	12	12	9	12	11	10	6	3
Pos.	Pilot	UAE (United Arab Emirates)	CRO (Croatia)	MYS (Malaysia)	POL (Poland)	GBR (United Kingdom)	USA1 (United States)	USA2 (United States)	AUT (Austria)	Points

Colour	Result
Gold	Winner
Silver	Second place
Bronze	Third place
Green	Points classification
Blue	Non-points classification
Blue	Non-classified finish (NC)
Purple	Retired, not classified (Ret)
Red	Did not qualify (DNQ)
Red	Did not pre-qualify (DNPQ)
Black	Disqualified (DSQ)
White	Did not start (DNS)
White	Withdrew (WD)
White	Race cancelled (C)
Blank	Did not practice (DNP)
Blank	Did not arrive (DNA)
Blank	Excluded (EX)

**Bold** – Fastest Qualifying Pilot

=== Challenger Class ===
Challenger Class pilots competed in at least three races throughout the season, with each pilot's best three scores counting towards the Challenger Cup ranking. The top six pilots in the ranking qualified for a winner-takes-all race at the Red Bull Ring.

==== Ranking ====
Challenger Class scoring system

Position	**1st**	**2nd**	**3rd**	**4th**	**5th**	**6th**
Points	10	8	6	4	2	0

Pos.	Pilot	UAE (United Arab Emirates)	CRO (Croatia)	MYS (Malaysia)	POL (Poland)	GBR (United Kingdom)	USA1 (United States)	USA2 (United States)	Drop	Points
1	(France) François Le Vot	1	1	1				6		30
2	(Sweden) Daniel Ryfa	2		3	2		3		6	22
3	(United Kingdom) Tom Bennett	5	2		3	2			2	22
4	(Malaysia) Halim Othman			6		1		1		20
5	(France) Mikaël Brageot	6	4				1	3		20
6	(Czech Republic) Petr Kopfstein	4		2	4			2	4	20
7	(Germany) Claudius Spiegel		6		1	3				16
8	(Spain) Juan Velarde	3		4			DSQ	4		14
9	(Slovenia) Peter Podlunšek		3	5		5	4		2	12
10	(Chile) Cristian Bolton				6	6	2			8
11	(Poland) Luke Czepiela		5		5	4		5	2	8
Pos.	Pilot	UAE (United Arab Emirates)	CRO (Croatia)	MYS (Malaysia)	POL (Poland)	GBR (United Kingdom)	USA1 (United States)	USA2 (United States)	Drop	Points

==== Final ====
At the last race of the season in Austria, the top six pilots in the standings took part in a race to determine the final ranking of the Challenger Cup.

Rank	Pilots	Time
1	(Czech Republic) Petr Kopfstein	1:05.799
2	(Malaysia) Halim Othman	1:06.900
3	(France) Mikaël Brageot	1:08.112
4	(France) François Le Vot	1:08.132
5	(Sweden) Daniel Ryfa	1:15.180
6	(United Kingdom) Tom Bennett	DNS
