= Sang Pencinta =

Studio album by M. Nasir
- Released: 16 May 2006
- Recorded: 2003–2006
- Studios: Studio Ronggeng (Paya Jaras, Sungai Buloh, Selangor)
- Genres: Ballad; Nusantara
- Length: 48:49
- Label: Warner Music Malaysia
- Producer: M. Nasir

M. Nasir chronology
Phoenix Bangkit (2006)	Sang Pencinta (2006)

Sang Pencinta (The Lover) is the seventh studio album by Malaysian singer-songwriter, M. Nasir, released on 16 May 2006 by Warner Music Malaysia. Three singles were released from the album.

== Production ==
M. Nasir began working for the material on the album in 2003 and like his previous albums, the album also was recorded primarily at Studio Ronggeng, Luncai Emas in Paya Jaras, Sungai Buloh, Selangor. Nasir initially to use the tentative title M. Nasir 2006 before settling on Sang Pencinta as the album title. For the album, M. Nasir utilise a different musical work than those produced for previous albums. The album's recording took three years to complete due to his busy work schedule with preparing albums for other singers in addition to acting and recording soundtrack albums.

He was joined by musicians such as Yazit Ahmad, Ujang Exists, Jay Jay, Nan, Rafie, Nafie Spider, Zul Mahat, Firdaus, Sashi, Irwandi and Aie'z Quest. Fadzli Fauzy, Fauzi Marzuki, Roslan Aziz, Peter Chong and Zairie serves as the recorder and mixer. The cover art was designed by Nizam Rahmat, with photography done by Bustamam Mokhtar.

== Release and promotion ==
Originally scheduled to be released on 28 March 2006, the album was officially released on 16 May 2006 to commercial success. The album's pre-listen sessions was held in February 2006 at the Luncai Emas' headquarters in Sungai Buloh, Selangor, about three months before its official release. Sang Pencinta was well received and sold 12,000 copies. To promote the album, M. Nasir held a meet and greet session at the Tower Records, KLCC on 24 June. "Juwita... (Citra Terindah)" was released as the first single with its accompanying music video starring Rozita Che Wan as the titular role. Rozita was chosen after the video's production team found her in the URTV magazine.

== Critical reception ==
Upon release, Sang Pencinta received generally positive reviews from music critics. Daryl Goh from The Star wrote: "...Sang Pencinta, which is intended as the only modern Malay album, is a tribute to the undoubted human ability to release lively recordings that preserve their musical heritage". A reviewer from Harian Metro said the musical arrangements in Sang Pencinta "quite simple, easy to listen to and has a fresh, interesting, unique and pleasant sound".

== Track listing ==
All tracks are written by M. Nasir except where noted.

No.	Title	Writer(s)	Length
1.	"Juwita... (Citra Terindah)"		4:45
2.	"Sang Pencinta"		4:06
3.	"Tujuh Nafas Lagi"		5:31
4.	"Tangisan Di Hujung Galaksi"	M. Nasir, Loloq	4:32
5.	"Vendeta"	M. Nasir, Loloq	4:19
6.	"Bahtera Raudah"		5:31
7.	"Destinasi:Eterniti"		4:41
8.	"Setiap Dambaan"		4:23
9.	"Apa Lagi"		5:34
10.	"Balada Seorang Teman"		6:47
Total length:			48:49
