= Ziana Zain No. 1s Live =

Live album by Ziana Zain
- Released: 24 July 2003
- Recorded: 1990–2003
- Genre: Pop
- Label: EMI
- Producer: Zig Zag Beat Sdn Bhd, Johari Teh

Ziana Zain chronology
Ratu - Satu Penghargaan (2003)	Ziana Zain No. 1s Live (2003)	Dingin (2008)

Ziana Zain No. 1s Live is the second live album by Malaysian singer Ziana Zain released in 2003. This album is the first album produced by Ziana's new label, EMI. It includes two new songs which were recorded in studio. The album also features Ziana's first attempt of composing her own song, Bukan, which received positive feedback and garnered notable awards.

== Track listing ==
1. "Lembah Asmara" (New Song) (Ajai, Slen) — 4:15
2. "Madah Berhelah 2003" (Saari Amri) — 4:37
3. "Anggapanmu / Kemelut Di Muara Kasih / Korban Cinta" (Asmin Mudin, Saari Amri, Johari Teh) — 8:19
4. "Syurga Di Hati Kita" (LY, Baiduri) — 6:47
5. "Setia Ku Di Sini" (Salman, Nurbisa II) — 4:45
6. "Kalau Mencari Teman" (Razman, Habsah Hassan) — 4:16
7. "Puncak Kasih" (Adnan Abu Hassan, Maya Sari) — 5:42
8. "Menadah Gerimis / Aku Cintakan Mu" (Azmeer, Johari Teh) — 9:29
9. "Kekal" (Saari Amri) — 4:22
10. "Bukan" (New Song) (Ziana Zain, Amran Omar) — 4:25

== Awards ==
Year	Award show	Award
2004	Anugerah Era	Best Pop Song Bukan - Won
2004	Anugerah Industri Muzik	Best Female Vocal Performance - Nominated
