= Srikandi Cintaku =

Studio album by M. Nasir
- Released: September 1999
- Recorded: 1998–1999
- Studios: Studio Ronggeng (Paya Jaras, Sungai Buloh, Selangor)
- Genres: Ballad; Nusantara
- Length: 50:21
- Labels: Luncai Emas; BMG Music Malaysia
- Producers: M. Nasir, Adnan Abu Hassan (exec.)

M. Nasir chronology
Canggung Mendonan (1993)	Srikandi Cintaku (1999)	Phoenix Bangkit (2001)

Srikandi Cintaku (My Love Heroine) is the fifth studio album by Malaysian singer-songwriter, M. Nasir, released in September 1999 by his own label, Luncai Emas and BMG Music Malaysia. Produced by Nasir with Adnan Abu Hassan serves as the executive producer, the album includes re-recording of his compositions performed by himself and other artistes.

== Production ==
The album was recorded primarily at M. Nasir's own recoding studio, Studio Ronggeng in Paya Jaras, Sungai Buloh, Selangor. Unlike his previous studio albums, none of the songs in the album were original materials. For the album, Nasir decided to reworked several of his earlier compositions in the 1980s performed by other artistes like Bloodshed, Search and Alleycats.

During the album's recording session, he was joined by musicians like Jay Jay on bass, Gary Gideon on drums, Zul Mahat on keyboards and Mohar on flute. Hillary Ang, guitarist of Search, plays electric guitar for "Meniti Titian Usang" and "Kerana". Backing vocals were provided by Adibah Noor, Syed Azlan (Arab) and Jay Jay. The album was specially dedicated in memory of Nasir's late wife, Junainah Johari, who died of asthma in August 1998.

The album was produced by Nasir himself with Adnan Abu Hassan serving as the executive producer, mixed by Ridzwan Hashim and mastered by Faisal Ghazali at the Synchrosound Studios in Petaling Jaya, Selangor. Srikandi Cintaku is the last album M. Nasir released with BMG Music Malaysia before signed recording contract with Warner Music Malaysia a year later.

== Release and reception ==
The album was released in September 1999 and become commercial success. It was also released in Indonesia in April 2000. To promote the album, Nasir held a mini concert and performed all 10 songs at the Angsana Shopping Complex on 16 October 1999.

The album also received two nominations at the seventh edition of Anugerah Industri Muzik and winning only one category.

== Track listing ==
No.	Title	Writer(s)	Original artist(s)	Length
1.	"Srikandi Cintaku"	M. Nasir, Nasir Jani	Bloodshed	5:02
2.	"Dari Kekasih Kepada Kekasih"	M. Nasir, Nurbisa	Hattan	5:01
3.	"Meniti Titian Usang"	M. Nasir, A. Rahim	Search	5:51
4.	"Kau Ratnaku"	M. Nasir, Nurbisa	Roy	4:39
5.	"Layang-Layang Terputus Talinya"	M. Nasir, S. Amin Shahab	Alleycats	4:58
6.	"Berikan Nurbisa"	M. Nasir, Nurbisa	Hattan	4:47
7.	"Nur Nilam Sari"	M. Nasir, Loloq	Search and Awie	5:28
8.	"Kerana"	M. Nasir	Alleycats	5:13
9.	"Cinta Sepi"	M. Nasir, S. Amin Shahab	Search	4:56
10.	"Suatu Masa"	M. Nasir	M. Nasir	4:41
Total length:				50:21

== Release history ==
Region	Release date	Format	Label
Malaysia	September 1999	CD, cassette, digital download, streaming media	Luncai Emas, BMG Music Malaysia
