= Best of Ziana Zain =

Greatest hits album by Ziana Zain
- Released: 1998
- Recorded: 1991–1997
- Genre: Pop
- Label: BMG

Ziana Zain chronology
Puncak Kasih (1997)	Best of Ziana Zain (1998)	Ziana Zain (1999)

Best of Ziana Zain is a greatest hits album by Ziana Zain that was released in 1998.

== Track listing ==
1. "Puncak Kasih" (Adnan Abu Hassan, Maya Sari) — 5:29
2. "Putus Terpaksa" (Saari Amri) — 5:10
3. "Anggapan Mu" (Asmin Mudin) — 4:43
4. "Madah Berhelah" (Saari Amri) — 4:48
5. "Satu Detik" (Azlan Abu Hassan, Maya Sari) — 3:37
6. "Kalau Mencari Teman" (Razman, Habsah Hassan) — 4:20
7. "Kemelut Di Muara Kasih" (Saari Amri, Lukhman S.) — 5:13
8. "Terlerai Kasih" (Johari Teh) — 4:14
9. "Setia Ku Di Sini" (Salman, Nurbisa II) — 5:09
10. "Kekal" (Saari Amri) — 4:10
11. "Korban Cinta" (Johari Teh) — 5:09
12. "Tiada Kepastian" (Johari Teh) — 3:43
13. "Bersama Akhirnya" (Johari Teh) — 4:56
14. "Tiada Jodoh Antara Kita" (Bonus Track) (Fauzi Marzuki, Lukhman S.) — 4:45

== Charts ==
Chart (1998)	Peak Position
Malaysian Albums Chart (RIAM)	4
