= Ziana Zain Unplugged =

Live album by Ziana Zain
- Released: 1996
- Recorded: 1991–1996
- Genre: Pop
- Label: BMG
- Producers: Johari Teh, Mohamad Firhad

Ziana Zain chronology
Setia Ku Di Sini (1995)	Ziana Zain Unplugged (1996)	Puncak Kasih (1997)

Ziana Zain Unplugged is Ziana Zain's first live album released in 1996. All the tracks were sung during live performance. The album went platinum, selling more than 80,000 copies in Malaysia.

== Album information ==
Ziana Zain Unplugged features thirteen live tracks from Ziana Zain's successful first unplugged concert show at Life Centre, Kuala Lumpur and one previously unreleased studio track: "Dekat Tapi Jauh" featuring Broery Marantika, which was fully composed by Johari Teh.

Ziana Zain Unplugged includes one song which wasn't available from Ziana's previous albums: "Gerhana". Two versions of this album were produced which were live version and studio version. The song "Gerhana" was included in both versions of the album.

== Track listing ==
1. "Sangkar Cinta" (Idzahar, Azam Dungun) — 4:54
2. "Kekal" (Johari Teh) — 4:36
3. "Ku Cinta Padamu" (Zuriani, Nanee) — 5:15
4. "Anggapanmu" (Asmin Mudin) — 4:57
5. "Mimpimu Bukan Mimpiku" (Zuriani, Nanee) — 4:55
6. "Kemelut Di Muara Kasih" (Saari Amri, Lukhman S.) — 7:02
7. "Setia Ku Di Sini" (Salman, Nurbisa II) — 5:08
8. "Di Sini Selamanya" (Zuriani, Nanee) — 4:14
9. "Tiada Kepastian" (Johari Teh) — 4:29
10. "Korban Cinta" (Johari Teh) — 5:21
11. "Madah Berhelah" (Saari Amri) — 5:28
12. "Dekat Tapi Jauh" (featuring Broery Marantika) (Johari Teh) — 4:01
13. "Gerhana" (Johari Teh) — 4:18

== Awards ==
Year	Award show	Award
1997	Anugerah Industri Muzik	Best Female Vocal Performance – Nominated
1997	Anugerah Juara Lagu	Best Ballad Song – Semifinalist for Gerhana; Best Song – Semifinalist for Gerhana

== Certification ==
Chart (1996)	Certification	Sales
Malaysian Albums Chart	Platinum	80,000

== Personnel ==
- Producer – Johari Teh
- Executive producer – Mohamad Firhad
- Executive A&R – Asni Abdul Samad
- Director of marketing & promotion – Rosmin Hashim
- Manager of marketing & promotion – Samirah Hambali
- Manager of RCA Domestic – Rohani Ismail
- Music director – Ramli M.S
- Music composition – Ramli M.S, Jimmy Ali, Mokhzani Ismail & Rosli Iman
- Guest artist – Broery Marantika
- Management of promotion – Lisa Aryanti Tahir, Farida Hassan, Rouslan Mokhtar, Asri Ismail, Rozana Abu Hassan & Eddie Hamid
- Live recording – King's Studio
- Engineer of live recording – Peter Pilley
- Mixing – Peter Chong
- Artwork – Andy & Dester (BMG Creative Dept.)
- Sponsor – Salem Cool Planet, TV3, Hotel Equatorial
- Stage/Set Concept – Bombay (KUL City)
- Set Decoration – RSM Creative
- Lightning Design – KUL City
- Lightning Director – Bombay
- Lightning Operator – Bombay, Treasure (Cahaya Audio)
