= Saudagar Mimpi =

- Album cover with BMG Music logo. The album's reissue edition has a Sony Music logo.

Studio album by M. Nasir
- Released: 30 April 1992
- Recorded: 1990–1992
- Genres: Ballad; Nusantara
- Length: 56:47
- Label: BMG Music Malaysia
- Producers: M. Nasir; Aziz Bakar; A. Hamid Samion

M. Nasir chronology
S.O.L.O. (1989)	Saudagar Mimpi (1992)	Canggung Mendonan (1993)

Saudagar Mimpi (The Dream Merchant) is the third studio album by Malaysian singer-songwriter M. Nasir, released on 30 April 1992 by BMG Music Malaysia.

== Production ==
The album took two years to completed. All tracks were composed by M. Nasir himself with lyrics written by himself with S. Amin Shahab, Loloq, Nasir Jani and Bob.

In the album, there is an English-languaged track titled "Monsoon Dance" which specially composed and written by M. Nasir when he joined a music program in Australia. In an interview with Malaysian entertainment magaine, URTV, M. Nasir said his purpose in including an English song in Saudagar Mimpi was not to negate the advantages of the Malay language and to make white people proud. He said: "After all, I hope that having an English song in this album will attract other races to listen to other Malay songs".

== Release and reception ==
Saudagar Mimpi was released on 30 April 1992 to popular success. "Apokalips" and "Di Balik Cermin Mimpi" were released as singles. As of July 1992, the album sold 50,000 copies.

== Track listing ==
No.	Title	Writer(s)	Length
1.	"Apokalips"	M. Nasir, Loloq	6:55
2.	"Inang Pulau Kencana"		5:50
3.	"Keroncong Nostradamus"	M. Nasir, Loloq	2:17
4.	"Di Balik Cermin Mimpi"	M. Nasir, S. Amin Shahab	3:41
5.	"Gong Impian"	M. Nasir, Nasir Jani	5:07
6.	"Hidayah"		4:26
7.	"Bikin Filim"	M. Nasir, Nasir Jani	5:45
8.	"Insan dan Manikam"	M. Nasir, Loloq	6:14
9.	"Gurindam Gunung Tahan"	M. Nasir, Loloq	5:39
10.	"Di Jalan Sesat"	M. Nasir, Bob Lokman	4:44
11.	"Monsoon Dance"	M. Nasir	5:32
Total length:			56:47

== Certifications ==
Region	Certifications	Certified units/sales
Malaysia	Platinum	50,000

== Release history ==
Region	Release date	Format	Label
Malaysia	30 April 1992	CD, cassette, digital download, streaming media	BMG Music Malaysia
