= A. Ali =

Malaysian musician (1949-2020)

- Born: Hamdan bin Atan; 1949; Federation of Malaya (now Malaysia)
- Died: 21 November 2020 (aged 71) Semenyih, Selangor, Malaysia
- Genres: Pop; ballad; folk
- Occupations: Singer, composer, lyricist, recording producer
- Instruments: Vocal; guitar
- Years active: 1970–2020
- Formerly of: The Nitewalkers; Sweet Charity; Kembara; Pelangi

A. Ali (born Hamdan Atan; 1949 – 21 November 2020) was a Malaysian singer, composer, lyricist and record producer. He is best known as the guitarist and vocalist of the band, Kembara.

== Biography ==
A. Ali began his music career in 1971 by joining The Nite Walkers. In 1975 , he joining Sweet Charity with Ramli Sarip, then was invited by M. Nasir to form the band, Kembara with S. Sahlan.

As a prolific composer, Ali has helped raise well-known local singers including Rohana Jalil's "Resahku" ("I'm Restless") and Francissca Peter's "Diriku Terbelenggu" ("I'm Shackled"). His composition, "Menaruh Harapan" ("Relying for Hope") which is performed by Zaiton Sameon has won the 1987 Anugerah Juara Lagu.

He also collaborated with John Goh by forming the band Pelangi in 1985. The group began to achieve commercial success with "Biarku Menjadi Lilin" ("Let Me Be The Candles"). In November 2014, he and Kembara performed at the Kembara's Gala Konsert Hati Emas night which took place at Panggung Sari, Istana Budaya.

He died in his sleep on 21 November 2020 at his residence in Semenyih, Selangor without suffering from any chronic illness. He is survived by his wife, Latifah Khamis, nine children and 10 grandchildren. His remains were buried at the Sungai Kantan Islamic Cemetery, Kajang after the Zohor prayers.
