= Roda Impian =

- Genre: Game show
- Created by: Merv Griffin
- Presented by: Halim Othman; Eja; Hani Mohsin; Fauziah Ghous; Liza AF1; Maskiran Jakiran; Zaida Zainal
- Opening theme: "Roda Impian"
- Ending theme: "Roda Impian"
- Country of origin: Malaysia
- No. of seasons: 11
- No. of episodes: 1,040

Production
- Production locations: Kuala Lumpur, Malaysia
- Running time: 60 minutes
- Production company: Filem Karya Nusa Sdn. Bhd.

Original release
- Network: Astro Ria
- Release: 1996 – 2006

Roda Impian (English: Dream Wheel) is the Malaysian version of Wheel Of Fortune which was aired on Astro Ria between 1996 and 2006. The game show was also aired on NTV7 in 1999. On TV3, the Astro Ria version was aired on a one-week delay in the early 2000s and later as a self programme produced by Filem Karya Nusa in 2009. It was the longest running and most watched game show in Malaysia until its end in 2006 due to Hani Mohsin's death from a sudden heart attack.

It returned in 2009 as a self programme produced by Filem Karya Nusa, hosted by Kieran on TV3. The show is on indefinite hiatus as of February 2010 since that brief run.

== Format ==
see: Wheel Of Fortune

== Hosts ==
Hosts	Broadcaster	Co-Host/Gadis Kotak Huruf
Halim Othman (1996–2002), Hani Mohsin (2002–2006)	Astro Ria	Zaidah Zainal, Abby Abadi, Eja, Liza AF1, Irma Hasmie
Kieran	TV3	Fauziah Gaus
