= Roslinda Abdul Majid =

Malaysian radio presenter and singer

DJ Lin
- Born: Roslinda binti Haji Abdul Majid; 31 December 1975 (age 50); Larkin Jaya, Johor Bahru, Johor, Malaysia
- Occupations: Radio presenters, singer, host
- Years active: 2004–present
- Children: 2
- Relatives: Ismail Abdul Majid (brother)

Roslinda Haji Abdul Majid or better known as DJ Lin (born 31 December 1975) is a Malaysian radio presenter and female singer. She is one of the Suria FM radio presenters and is famous for the Suria Cinta radio show that she handles.

== Education ==
DJ Lin is a graduate in Mass Communication (Journalism) at Universiti Teknologi MARA (UiTM) Shah Alam campus, Selangor.

== Career ==
Roslinda, better known as DJ Lin started her early career at Best 104 before moving to Suria FM.

On June 1, 2006, she joined Suria FM where she hosted the Suria Cinta show every Friday to Sunday from 8pm to 1am. Suria Cinta discusses the topic of relationships and romance. She also holds the position of Program Manager at Suria as well as holding a new position in the management of Star Radio Group.

In November 2011, DJ Lin began her music career by releasing his first solo single,Ranting Kenanga created by Eddie Hamid and written by Ku Seman Ku Hussein.

She also hosts the show Apa Itu Cinta which discusses the love stories of popular celebrities of the country. It garnered 500,000 views on Suria FM’s official Facebook.

== Personal life ==
DJ Lin is the seventh child of 10 siblings, born and raised in Larkin Jaya, Johor Bahru, Johor. She is a single mother of two children from a previous marriage.

Her father died in 2000. Her mother, Puteh Jantan suffered from swollen heart and water filled the body especially the lungs due to kidney failure to function properly. His brother Ismail Abd Majid, died suddenly due to extreme high blood pressure until the blood vessels in his head ruptured on November 6, 2017 at 51 years old

DJ Lin underwent surgery to remove fibroids, which are tumors in the cervix on May 1, 2019. She was advised by doctors to rest for a month or two.

== Discography ==
Single
Year	Title
2013	"Ranting Kenangan"

== Awards ==
Year	Award	Category	Note
2010	Anugerah Sri Angkasa 2010	Best Female Radio Presenter	Won
2012	Anugerah Ikon Wanita Muda 2012	Knight Princess Radio Presenter	Recipient
2013	Anugerah Bintang Popular Berita Harian 2012	Popular Female Radio Presenter	Nominated
2013	Anugerah Bintang Popular Berita Harian 2014	Popular Female Radio Presenter	Nominated
2016	Anugerah Bintang Popular Berita Harian 2015	Popular Female Radio Presenter	Won
2018	Anugerah Bintang Popular Berita Harian 2017	Popular Radio Announcer	Nominated
2019	Anugerah MeleTOP Era 2019	MeleTOP Radio Presenter	Nominated
2019	Anugerah Bintang Popular Berita Harian 2019	Popular Radio Announcer	Won
2020	Anugerah Bintang Popular Berita Harian 2020	Popular Radio Announcer	Won
2021	Anugerah Bintang Popular Berita Harian 2021	Popular Radio Announcer	Won
