= Merah =

- Directed by: M. Nasir
- Written by: M. Nasir; Loloq
- Produced by: M. Nasir
- Starring: Awie; Ziana Zain; M. Nasir
- Cinematography: Jamaluddin Maarif
- Edited by: Dr. Deris Hashim; King Jamaluddin
- Production company: Luncai Emas
- Distributed by: Skop Productions
- Release date: 19 December 1996
- Country: Malaysia
- Language: Malay
- Box office: MYR 1.5 million

Merah (transl. Red) is a 1996 Malaysian Malay-language romantic action film directed, co-written and composed by M. Nasir in his directorial debut and starring himself, Awie in the titular role and Ziana Zain.

== Cast ==
- Awie as Merah
- Ziana Zain as Kasih
- M. Nasir as Hassan
- Hani Mohsin as Salleh
- Jalaluddin Hassan as Kasih's father

== Production ==
The film deviated from the norm by having a predominately male cast.

== Soundtrack ==
The music was composed by M. Nasir and was released by BMG on 18 November 1996.

== Release and reception ==
A charity screening of the film took place on 30 November 1997 at Tunku Syed Putra Hall, University Sains Malaysia (USM) in Penang.

The film was well received. Reviewing the film at its premiere, a critic from The Malay Mail called the film "simply superb". A critic from The New Straits Times wrote that "Merah is an impressive directorial debut and an example of Malaysian film acting at its best". The critic criticised the supporting cast, uneven dialogue, and Ziana's undeveloped character and concluded that the film gives hope to the Malay film industry. A critic from Berita Minggu wrote that the film is full of suspense. Haliza Ahmad of The Malay Mail wrote that "Awie, Ziana put up a creditable show". The film was noted for having a different style of storytelling than other Malay films.

== Accolades ==
| Year | Event | Category | Recipient | Outcome | Ref. |
|---|---|---|---|---|---|
| 1997 | Anugerah Skrin by TV3 | Best Film | M. Nasir | Won | |
| 1997 | First East Asian Film and TV Festival (EAFTAB) | Pearl Awards | Merah | Shortlisted | |
