= Ziana Zain (1999 album) =

Studio album by Ziana Zain
- Released: 9 March 1999
- Recorded: 1998–1999
- Genre: Pop
- Label: BMG
- Producer: Adnan Abu Hassan, Azmeer, Johari Teh, LY, Azlan Abu Hassan, Salman, Azman Abu Hassan, Mokhtaza Ahmad

Ziana Zain chronology
Best of Ziana Zain (1998)	Ziana Zain (1999)	Aku Cintakan Mu (2001)

Ziana Zain is the fifth studio album from Malaysian pop singer Ziana Zain released in 1999. The lead single of the album, Syurga Di Hati Kita, was specially composed for her from the composer, as a present for her marriage.

== Track listing ==
1. "Syurga Di Hati Kita" (LY, Baiduri) – 5:42
2. "Gementar Menghukum Kalbu" (Azmeer, Seni Bayan) – 4:49
3. "Kedamaian" (Azlan Abu Hassan, Ucu) – 4:45
4. "Semarak Kasih" (Salman, Awira) – 4:43
5. "Perjuangan" (Johari Teh, Jasmi) – 4:16
6. "Ada Suara Ada Cinta" (Azman Abu Hassan, Ucu) – 4:42
7. "Rahsia Semalam" (Johari Teh, Aryan) – 4:32
8. "Penawar Semalu" (Adnan Abu Hassan, Maya Sari) – 4:21
9. "Satu Persatu" (Azmeer, Azmira) – 4:07
10. "Kesuma Hati" (Adnan Abu Hassan, Maya Sari) – 5:31

== Awards ==
Year	Award show	Award
1999	Anugerah Juara Lagu	Best Ballad Song – Finalist for Syurga Di Hati Kita; Best Song – Finalist for Syurga Di Hati Kita

== Certification ==
Chart (1999)	Certification	Sales
Malaysian Albums Chart	Platinum	50,000
