= Ratu – Satu Penghargaan =

Greatest hits album by Ziana Zain
- Released: May 2003
- Recorded: 1991–2001
- Genre: Pop
- Label: BMG
- Producer: Edrie Hashim

Ziana Zain chronology
Aku Cintakan Mu (2001)	Ratu – Satu Penghargaan (2003)	Ziana Zain No. 1s Live (2003)

Ratu – Satu Penghargaan is a greatest-hits album by Malaysian singer Ziana Zain which was released in May 2003. The album sums up the past twelve years of her singing career with BMG label, before joining EMI label.

== Track listing ==
1. "Puncak Kasih" (Adnan Abu Hassan, Maya Sari) – 5:35
2. "Anggapanmu" (Asmin Mudin) – 4:36
3. "Setia Ku Di Sini" (Salman, Nurbisa II) – 5:07
4. "Madah Berhelah" (Saari Amri) – 4:45
5. "Setia Ke Akhir Hayat" (LY) – 5:16
6. "Tiada Jodoh Antara Kita" (Fauzi Marzuki, Lukhman S.) – 4:46
7. "Berpisah Jua" (Asmin Mudin) – 5:30
8. "Putus Terpaksa" (Saari Amri) – 5:08
9. "Menadah Gerimis" (Azmeer) – 5:21
10. "Korban Cinta" (Johari Teh) – 5:12
11. "Kemelut Di Muara Kasih" (Saari Amri, Lukhman S.) – 5:13
12. "Senjan Nan Merah" (featuring Awie) (Saari Amri) – 5:46
13. "Di Akhir Garisan" (featuring Nora, Ning Baizura & Dessy Fitri) (Paul Begaud, Johari Teh) – 5:06
14. "Pusaka Rimba" (featuring Dayang Nurfaizah) (Azalea) – 4:30
15. "Chitose Bashi" (Mieko Nishijima, Kenji Kadoya) – 4:30
