= 2014 Red Bull Air Race of Abu Dhabi =

The 2014 Red Bull Air Race of Abu Dhabi was the 1st round of the 2014 Red Bull Air Race World Championship, the ninth season of the Red Bull Air Race World Championship. The event was held in Abu Dhabi, the capital city of the United Arab Emirates.

== Master Class ==
=== Qualification ===
Pos	No.	Pilot	Run Time	Pen
1	84	(Canada) Pete McLeod	57.932	
2	55	(United Kingdom) Paul Bonhomme	58.129	
3	9	(United Kingdom) Nigel Lamb	58.308	
4	22	(Austria) Hannes Arch	58.353	
5	95	(Australia) Matt Hall	58.713	
6	8	(Czech Republic) Martin Šonka	58.929	
7	27	(France) Nicolas Ivanoff	58.989	
8	10	(United States) Kirby Chambliss	59.699	
9	31	(Japan) Yoshihide Muroya	59.858	
10	21	(Germany) Matthias Dolderer	59.904	+1sec
11	99	(United States) Michael Goulian	1:00.362	
12	91	(Hungary) Péter Besenyei	1:02.163	

=== Round of 12 ===
Heat	Pilot One	Time One	Time Two	Pilot Two
1	(Czech Republic) Martin Šonka (6)	59.573	58.799	(France) Nicolas Ivanoff (7)
2	(Australia) Matt Hall (5)	58.669	1:01.009^{1}	(United States) Kirby Chambliss (8)
3	(Austria) Hannes Arch (4)	57.267	59.813	(Japan) Yoshihide Muroya (9)
4	(United Kingdom) Nigel Lamb (3)	57.843	58.500	(Germany) Matthias Dolderer (10)
5	(United Kingdom) Paul Bonhomme (2)	57.978	DNS	(United States) Michael Goulian (11)
6	(Canada) Pete McLeod (1)	58.784	1:00.909	(Hungary) Péter Besenyei (12)

Key
Qualified for next round
Knocked out
Fastest losers, qualified

^1 Pilot received 2 seconds in penalties.

=== Super 8 ===
Pos	No.	Pilot	Run Time	Pen
1	84	(Canada) Pete McLeod	56.710	
2	22	(Austria) Hannes Arch	56.869	
3	55	(United Kingdom) Paul Bonhomme	58.018	
4	95	(Australia) Matt Hall	58.028	
5	9	(United Kingdom) Nigel Lamb	58.694	
6	21	(Germany) Matthias Dolderer	58.697	
7	8	(Czech Republic) Martin Šonka	58.913	
8	27	(France) Nicolas Ivanoff	59.150	

=== Final 4 ===
Pos	No.	Pilot	Run Time	Pen
1	55	(United Kingdom) Paul Bonhomme	56.439	
2	22	(Austria) Hannes Arch	56.776	
3	84	(Canada) Pete McLeod	57.057	
4	95	(Australia) Matt Hall	DNF	

== Challenger Class ==
=== Results ===
Pos	No.	Pilot	Run Time	Pen
1	35	(France) François Le Vot	1:02.654	
2	17	(Sweden) Daniel Ryfa	1:02.679	
3	26	(Spain) Juan Velarde	1:03.281	
4	18	(Czech Republic) Petr Kopfstein	1:03.778	
5	7	(United Kingdom) Tom Bennett	1:04.396	
6	11	(France) Mikaël Brageot	1:04.556	+1sec

== Standings after the event ==
Master Class standings

Pos	Pilot	Pts
1	(United Kingdom) Paul Bonhomme	12
2	(Canada) Pete McLeod	9
3	(Austria) Hannes Arch	7
4	(Australia) Matt Hall	5
5	(United Kingdom) Nigel Lamb	4

Challenger Class standings

Pos	Pilot	Pts
1	(France) François Le Vot	10
2	(Sweden) Daniel Ryfa	8
3	(Spain) Juan Velarde	6
4	(Czech Republic) Petr Kopfstein	4
5	(United Kingdom) Tom Bennett	2

- Note: Only the top five positions are included for both sets of standings.

Previous race: 2010 Red Bull Air Race of Lisbon	Red Bull Air Race; 2014 season	Next race: 2014 Red Bull Air Race of Rovinj
Previous race: 2010 Red Bull Air Race of Abu Dhabi	Red Bull Air Race of Abu Dhabi	Next race: 2015 Red Bull Air Race of Abu Dhabi
