= 2014 Red Bull Air Race of Rovinj =

The 2014 Red Bull Air Race of Rovinj was the second round of the 2014 Red Bull Air Race World Championship, the ninth season of the Red Bull Air Race World Championship. The event was held in Rovinj, on the Adriatic coast of Croatia.

== Master Class ==
=== Qualification ===
Pos	No.	Pilot	Run Time	Pen
1	22	(Austria) Hannes Arch	57.720	
2	55	(United Kingdom) Paul Bonhomme	57.870	
3	84	(Canada) Pete McLeod	58.150	
4	21	(Germany) Matthias Dolderer	58.510	
5	9	(United Kingdom) Nigel Lamb	58.640	
6	31	(Japan) Yoshihide Muroya	58.680	
7	10	(United States) Kirby Chambliss	59.820	
8	91	(Hungary) Péter Besenyei	1:00.210	
9	95	(Australia) Matt Hall	1:00.560	+1sec
10	27	(France) Nicolas Ivanoff	1:00.630	
11	99	(United States) Michael Goulian	1:01.400	
12	8	(Czech Republic) Martin Šonka	DNF	+1sec

=== Round of 12 ===
Heat	Pilot One	Time One	Time Two	Pilot Two
1	(Japan) Yoshihide Muroya (6)	1:01.900	DNF^{1}	(United States) Kirby Chambliss (7)
2	(United Kingdom) Nigel Lamb (5)	1:00.610	DNF^{1}	(Hungary) Péter Besenyei (8)
3	(Germany) Matthias Dolderer (4)	DNF^{1}	59.420	(Australia) Matt Hall (9)
4	(Canada) Pete McLeod (3)	DNF^{1}	1:01.310	(France) Nicolas Ivanoff (10)
5	(United Kingdom) Paul Bonhomme (2)	59.490	DNF^{1}	(United States) Michael Goulian (11)
6	(Austria) Hannes Arch (1)	1:00.590	1:02.550^{1}	(Czech Republic) Martin Šonka (12)

Key
Qualified for next round
Knocked out
Fastest losers, qualified

^1 Pilot received 1 second in penalties.

=== Super 8 ===
Pos	No.	Pilot	Run Time	Pen
1	22	(Austria) Hannes Arch	59.080	
2	55	(United Kingdom) Paul Bonhomme	59.190	
3	84	(Canada) Pete McLeod	1:00.170	
4	31	(Japan) Yoshihide Muroya	1:00.300	
5	27	(France) Nicolas Ivanoff	1:01.670	
6	8	(Czech Republic) Martin Šonka	1:03.060	+1sec
7	95	(Australia) Matt Hall	DNF	+1sec
8	9	(United Kingdom) Nigel Lamb	DNS	

=== Final 4 ===
Pos	No.	Pilot	Run Time	Pen
1	22	(Austria) Hannes Arch	59.010	
2	55	(United Kingdom) Paul Bonhomme	59.090	
3	31	(Japan) Yoshihide Muroya	1:00.130	
4	84	(Canada) Pete McLeod	1:01.720	+1sec

== Challenger Class ==
=== Results ===
Pos	No.	Pilot	Run Time	Pen
1	35	(France) François Le Vot	1:01.190	
2	7	(United Kingdom) Tom Bennett	1:02.530	
3	25	(Slovenia) Peter Podlunšek	1:02.760	
4	11	(France) Mikaël Brageot	1:03.190	
5	6	(Poland) Luke Czepiela	1:03.270	
6	23	(Germany) Claudius Spiegel	1:05.120	+1sec

== Standings after the event ==
Master Class standings

Pos	Pilot	Pts
1	(Austria) Hannes Arch	21
1	(United Kingdom) Paul Bonhomme	21
3	(Canada) Pete McLeod	12
4	(Japan) Yoshihide Muroya	
4	(Australia) Matt Hall	

Challenger Class standings

Pos	Pilot	Pts
1	(France) François Le Vot	20
2	(United Kingdom) Tom Bennett	8
2	(Sweden) Daniel Ryfa	8
4	(Slovenia) Peter Podlunšek	6
4	(Spain) Juan Velarde	6

- Note: Only the top five positions are included for both sets of standings.

Previous race: 2014 Red Bull Air Race of Abu Dhabi	Red Bull Air Race; 2014 season	Next race: 2014 Red Bull Air Race of Putrajaya
Previous race: None	Red Bull Air Race of Rovinj	Next race: 2015 Red Bull Air Race of Rovinj
