= Halim Othman =

Malaysian radio and television presenter

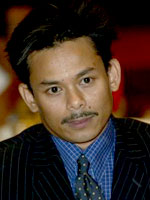
- Born: Abdul Halim bin Othman; 28 September 1964 (age 61); Kemaman, Terengganu, Malaysia
- Education: University of Tennessee, United States
- Occupations: Radio personality and television host
- Years active: 1993–present

Abdul Halim Othman (born 28 September 1964) is a Malaysian radio and television announcer. He was the host of Roda Impian before being replaced by Hani Mohsin. He was also a host for his own talk show program the Halim Othman Live show in Astro Ria.

== Life and career ==
Originally from Kemaman, Terengganu, Halim is a former student of Sultan Mahmud Science Secondary School (SESMA), Terengganu. Halim began his early career as a Selamat Pagi Malaysia (SPM) host on Radio Television Malaysia (RTM) in 1993, with the nickname 'HO' growing in popularity and sticking to the mind of his hometown fans as a host and radio presenter in his own style.

After gaining experience as an SPM host, Halim went a step further when he was selected to host the Roda Impian program, which was well received in 1996.

Early in his career, he was known through the Era radio station as a morning crew on the ERA. Coupled with Khairil Rashid, and later Linda Onn, he was known to impress the audience with his powerful voice. Through his career at ERA, he won the Best Radio Presenter Award in the Anugerah Bintang Popular for 4 consecutive years. He was among the earliest presenters of the Era including Khairil, Linda, Kudsia Kahar, David Low, Seelan Paul, Jamal Jamaluddin, Nadira Azizan, Subarma Mokhtaruddin and Najman Mohamed.

After a successful breakthrough, ERA management moved him from the station to Malaysia's famous radio station, Sinar FM. Together with Sinar, he managed to create his own name by forming a group of listeners of various ages.

On 18 January 2008, Halim announced his retirement from his broadcasting career and ended his career as a radio presenter, declaring to concentrate on the field of calligraphy.

=== Return ===
In January 2010, Halim decided to join the radio station Suria FM and surprised many of his fans. Also joining the station was popular female radio host Linda Onn. Halim's presence, which runs the Breakfast @ Suria from 6am to 10am with Zizi and Viviana Layola and joins Linda in Suria 20, successfully raised the station's ratings with a 100% increase in viewership in May 2010.

In April 2016, Halim returned to the TV scene after nearly a decade.

== Television ==
- Roda Impian (TV3) (1996-2002)
- Halim Othman Live (Astro Ria) (2005)
