= S.O.L.O. =

Studio album by M. Nasir
- Released: 13 November 1989
- Recorded: 1987–1989
- Genres: Ballad; Nusantara
- Length: 59:44
- Labels: Pacific Music Corporation; BMG Music Malaysia
- Producer: M. Nasir

M. Nasir chronology
Untuk Pencinta Seni (1979)	S.O.L.O. (1989)	Saudagar Mimpi (1992)

S.O.L.O. is the second studio album by Malaysian singer-songwriter M. Nasir, released on 13 November 1989 by Pacific Music Corporation and BMG. It is his first solo album in 10 years since Untuk Pencinta Seni (For the Art Lovers; 1979).

== Production ==
After the release of his debut solo album, Untuk Pencinta Seni (1979), which failed commercial success, M. Nasir set up his band Kembara in 1981, and then went solo again. Following the dissolution of Kembara, M. Nasir began working on a material for S.O.L.O. in 1987.

He recorded the album with musicians Yazit Ahmad, drummer of Malaysian rock band Search, Amry, former drummer of Ariwatan, Zulkifli Mahat on keyboard, Eddie Marzuki, former guitarist of Flybaits, Maniam on bongo, and Benny Arjuna on harmonica. About 20 musical instruments was used to create the authentic Nusantara music.

== Release and reception ==
Originally schedulled to be released in July 1989, S.O.L.O. was officially released on 13 November 1989 as a cassette, then as a CD in 1994. It was his first album registered under his present stage name. Five songs in this album were released as singles, including "Falsafah Cinta" featuring a duet with Rahim Maarof. The album became a commercial success, selling 50,000 units, and earning M. Nasir two special awards from BMG Music a year later.

Writing for URTV, Fatimah Hassan wrote that S.O.L.O still has Malay elements even though there are western elements but still prioritizes the Nusantara Malay culture. In his retrospective review for Harian Metro on the album, Riadz Radzi called S.O.L.O as "the best album that M. Nasir ever recorded".

== Track listing ==
All tracks are written by M. Nasir except where noted.

No.	Title	Writer(s)	Length
1.	"Tari Cinta Rimba Mistikal"	M. Nasir, Dr. Wan Zawawi	6:08
2.	"Mustika"		6:01
3.	"Rajawali Terbang Tinggi"		5:38
4.	"Yang Bertakhta Akhirnya"		5:48
5.	"Demi Masa"		6:40
6.	"Semakin Nyata"		4:34
7.	"Seloka Jengela Melayu"	M. Nasir, Loloq	5:10
8.	"Padang Lalang"	M. Nasir, Bob Lokman	5:28
9.	"Sayembara Hidup"		4:30
10.	"Biarkan Luncai Terjun"		5:42
11.	"Falsafah Cinta" (feat. Rahim Maarof)	M. Nasir, Bob Lokman	5:16
Total length:			44:59

== Release history ==
Region	Release date	Format	Label
Malaysia	13 November 1989	CD, cassette, digital download	BMG Music Malaysia, PMC
