= Aku Cintakan Mu =

Studio album by Ziana Zain
- Released: 20 August 2001
- Recorded: 2001
- Genre: Pop
- Label: BMG
- Producer: Johari Teh, Adnan Abu Hassan, Ajai, Azmeer, Azlan Abu Hassan

Ziana Zain chronology
Ziana Zain (1999)	Aku Cintakan Mu (2001)	Ratu - Satu Penghargaan (2003)

Aku Cintakan Mu is the sixth studio album from Malaysian pop singer Ziana Zain released on 20 August 2001.

== Track listing ==
1. "Terkenang Jua" (Ajai, Amran Omar) – 4:34
2. "Fatalistik" (Azlan Abu Hassan, Ucu) – 3:55
3. "Cintamani" (Adnan Abu Hassan, Maya Sari) – 5:19
4. "Dilema Malam" (Fauzi Marzuki, Ucu) – 4:41
5. "Dibiar Resah" (Salman, Lukhman S.) – 5:22
6. "Bagai Gahara" (Pak Ngah, Che Kem) – 5:25
7. "Aku Cintakan Mu" (Johari Teh) – 4:33
8. "Lara" (Azlan Abu Hassan, Azalea) – 4:44
9. "Dengarkanlah" (Ajai, Amran Omar) – 4:15
10. "Menadah Gerimis" (Azmeer) – 5:18

== Awards ==
Year	Award show	Award
2002	Anugerah Industri Muzik	Best Female Vocal Performance – Nominated
2002	Anugerah Juara Lagu	Best Ballad Song – Menadah Gerimis – Won; Best Ballad Song – Semi-finalist for Terkenang Jua; Best Ethnic Song – Semi-finalist for Bagai Gahara
2002	Anugerah Planet Muzik	Best Song for Menadah Gerimis – Won; Best Album – Won

== Certification ==
Chart (2001)	Certification	Sales
Malaysian Albums Chart	Platinum	45,000
