= Madah Berhelah =

1991 studio album by Ziana Zain

Studio album by Ziana Zain
- Released: 16 December 1991
- Recorded: August – November 1991
- Studios: King Studio; Channel 11
- Genres: pop; ballad; soft rock
- Length: 44:09
- Label: BMG
- Producer: Rahim Othman

Ziana Zain chronology
Madah Berhelah (1991)	Ziana Zain (1993)

Singles from Madah Berhelah
- 1. "Madah Berhelah" Released: 21 October 1991; 2. "Riwayat Cinta" Released: 20 January 1992; 3. "Teruna Dara" Released: 30 March 1992; 4. "Kekalkan Warisan" Released: 8 June 1992; 5. "Rentak Hidupku" Released: 13 July 1992; 6. "Dalam Kesakitan Ini" Released: 28 September 1992

Madah Berhelah is the debut studio album by Malaysian singer Ziana Zain. It was released on Disember 16, 1991, by BMG Pacific. It features a mix of pop songs and ballads influenced by 1980s soft rock. The album was produced by Rahim Othman. Upon its release, Madah Berhelah received generally positive reviews from music critics, who complimented Ziana's voice and technique, as well as the album's content.

The title track and lead single was both a critical and commercial success. It was considered to be Ziana's signature song and helped establish her career. The single was a finalist in 1992's Anugerah Juara Lagu in the "Creative Pop" category. However, the song lost to Nash's "Pada Syurga Di Wajahmu". The followup single was "Riwayat Cinta".

Madah Berhelah sold 40,000 copies in Malaysia and was certified Gold by RIM.

== Accolades ==
Year	Award	Category	Recipient(s) and nominee(s)	Result	Ref.
1992	7th Anugerah Juara Lagu	Best Creative Pop Song	"Madah Berhelah"	Nominated	
1993	Pujaan 10 Nescafe	Best Performance (Solo)	"Madah Berhelah"	Nominated	
1993	Pujaan 10 Nescafe	Most Popular Song (Solo)	"Madah Berhelah"	Nominated	

== Track listing ==
Madah Berhelah – Standard edition
No.	Title	Writer(s)	Composer(s)	Length
1.	"Riwayat Cinta"	Faisal Aziz	Faisal Aziz	3:52
2.	"Kehidupan"	Megat Ismail	Rahim Othman	4:58
3.	"Ke Mana Perginya Cahaya"	Rosli Ali	Ajib	4:55
4.	"Kekalkan Warisan"	Rosli Ali	Ajib	4:50
5.	"Cinta Gugur Satu-Satu"	Usop	Ali Noor	5:10
6.	"Teruna Dara"	Rosli Ali	Rahim Othman	4:15
7.	"Sebelum Terlewat Waktu"	Juwie	Rahim Othman	4:38
8.	"Rentak Hidupku"	Megat Ismail	Rahim Othman	4:55
9.	"Dalam Kesakitan Ini"	Lukhman S	Fauzi Marzuki	5:09
10.	"Madah Berhelah"	Saari Amri	Saari Amri	4:48
Total length:				44:90

== Personnel ==
Adapted from album liner notes.

Vocalists

- Ziana Zain – lead vocals

Technical and musicians

- Hamid – executive producer
- David – mixing
- Zairi – mixing
- Danny – recorder
- Thana – recorder
- Fauzi Marzuki – mixing, guitar, bass, string, composed
- Rahim Othman – keyboard, composed
- Jenny Chin – keyboard
- Boon – piano, keyboard
- Ajib – guitar, composed
- Mat Mega – bass
- Munir – drums
- Gary Gideon – drums
- Ritta – marketing
- Azhar – marketing
- Amran – marketing

== Certifications and sales ==
Certifications for Madah Berhelah, with pure sales where available
Region	Certification	Sales	Ref.
Malaysia (RIM)	Platinum	45,000	

== Release history ==
Madah Berhelah release history
Region	Date	Format(s)	Edition(s)	Label(s)	Ref.
Malaysia	16 December 1991	CD; cassette	Standard	BMG Pacific	
Various	January 2013	streaming; digital download	Standard	Sony	
