= Labuhan Ratu =

District in Lampung, Indonesia

- District
- Interactive map of Labuhan Ratu
- Coordinates: 5°7′3.8172″S 105°40′35.7528″E
- Country: Indonesia
- Province: Lampung
- Regency: East Lampung

Area
  - Total: 485.51 km^{2} (187.46 sq mi)

Population (2020)
  - Total: 51,979
  - Density: 107.06/km^{2} (277.29/sq mi)
- Time zone: UTC+07:00 (Western Indonesia Time)
- Postal code: 34375

Labuhan Ratu is an administrative district (kecamatan) in East Lampung Regency, Lampung, Indonesia.
