= Setia Ku Di Sini =

1995 studio album by Ziana Zain

- Standard cover

Studio album by Ziana Zain
- Released: 24 July 1995
- Recorded: January – June 1995
- Studio: Kings Studio; Luncai Emas Sdn. Bhd.; Dreamwalk Studio
- Genre: pop; ballad
- Length: 43:38
- Label: BMG
- Producer: Salman; Saari Amri; Zuriani; Jay Jay; Ramli M.S.; Zul Nadzar

Ziana Zain chronology
Ziana Zain (1993)	Setia Ku Di Sini (1995)	Ziana Zain Unplugged (1996)

Singles from Setia Ku Di Sini
- 1. "Bersama Akhirnya" Released: 5 June 1995; 2. "Setia Ku Di Sini" Released: 24 July 1995; 3. "Sangkar Cinta" Released: 11 September 1995; 4. "Kemelut Di Muara Kasih" Released: 16 October 1995; 5. "Tiada Kepastian" Released: 1 April 1996

Setia Ku Di Sini is the third studio album by Malaysian singer Ziana Zain. It was released through BMG Music (Malaysia) on 24 July 1995. The songs were composed mainly by Johari Teh, Salman, Idzahar, Saari Amri, Jay Jay, X.Boy, and Aidit.

After its release, Setia Ku Di Sini received generally mixed reviews from music critics but became a huge commercial success, topping the charts in Malaysia and Singapore. Setia Ku Di Sini remains one of the best-selling albums of 1995 (Malaysia), with sales of over 120 thousands copies in Malaysia. Singles released from the album include the Radio 1 number one "Bersama Akhirnya", the Muzik-Muzik number one "Setia Ku Di Sini", and "Kemelut Di Muara Kasih".

Setia Ku Di Sini won the Anugerah Industri Muzik for Best Vocal Performance in an Album (Female) and was nominated for the Anugerah Industri Muzik for Best Album Cover and Best Pop Album in 1996. "Kemelut Di Muara Kasih" was also nominated for the Anugerah Juara Lagu for Best Ballad Song in 1996. "Bersama Akhirnya" won the Voice of Asia for Best Song Awards.

== Accolades ==
Year	Award	Category	Recipient(s) and nominee(s)	Result	Ref.
1995	Voice of Asia	Best Song	"Bersama Akhirnya"	Won	
1996	Pujaan 10 Nescafe	Best Performance (Solo)	"Bersama Akhirnya"	Nominated	
1996	Pujaan 10 Nescafe	Most Popular Song (Solo)	"Bersama Akhirnya"	Nominated	
1996	3rd Anugerah Industri Muzik	Best Vocal Performance in an Album (Female)	Setia Ku Di Sini	Won	
1996	3rd Anugerah Industri Muzik	Best Album Cover	Setia Ku Di Sini	Nominated	
1996	3rd Anugerah Industri Muzik	Best Pop Album	Setia Ku Di Sini	Nominated	
1996	11th Anugerah Juara Lagu	Best Ballad Song	"Kemelut Di Muara Kasih"	Nominated	

== Track listing ==
Standard edition
No.	Title	Lyrics	Music	Producer(s)	Length
1.	"Tiada Kepastian"	Johari Teh	Johari Teh	Ramli M.S.	3:43
2.	"Sangkar Cinta"	Azam Dungun	Idzahar	Saari Amri	5:04
3.	"Kemelut Di Muara Kasih"	Lukhman S	Saari Amri	Saari Amri	5:10
4.	"Antara Ikhlas Dan Paksa"	Usop	Jay Jay	Jay Jay	4:36
5.	"Tuduhan"	Nuar	Zuriani	Zuriani	4:22
6.	"Kini Ku Mengerti"	Johan Aziz	Zul Nadzar	Zuriani	3:47
7.	"Rantaian Kasih"	Rosli Ali	X.Boy	Zuriani	3:30
8.	"Bersama Akhirnya"	Johari Teh	Johari Teh	Salman	4:56
9.	"Kehadiran Mu"	Salman	Hussain Anwar	Zul Nadzar	5:26
10.	"Setia Ku Di Sini"	Nurbisa II	Salman	Jay Jay	5:09
Total length:					43:83

== Certifications and sales ==
Certifications for Setia Ku Di Sini, with pure sales where available
Region	Certification	Sales	Ref.
Malaysia (RIM)	3× Platinum	175,000	

== Personnel ==
- Executive producer: Johari Teh
- Mastering: Ramli MS, Johari Teh, Adnan Abu Hassan, Azlan Abu Hassan, Helen Yap, Fauzi Marzuki
- Concept & A&R: Johari Teh
- Coordinator A & R: Edrie Hashim
- Promotion management: Samirah, Rohani, Rina, Sharum, Nan Dengkil, Freda Hassan (Singapura)
- Recording studio: Synchrosound Studio, GrooveWorks Studio, WizardWorks Production
- Mastering: Fauzi Marzuki @ Sonic Mastering Lab
- Album artwork: Foo @ Matchbox Studio
- Make-up: Nurul
- Clothing: Versace
- Photography: Boestamam @ Jubang Sutajio
