= Puncak Kasih =

1997 studio album by Ziana Zain

Studio album by Ziana Zain
- Released: May 26, 1997
- Recorded: November 1996 – April 1997
- Studio: Kings Studio; Studio 67; Menora Studios; Utusan Audio
- Genre: pop; ballad; R&B; traditional
- Length: 51:45
- Label: BMG
- Producer: Saari Amri; Johari Teh; Adnan Abu Hassan; Fauzi Marzuki; Razman

Ziana Zain chronology
Ziana Zain Unplugged (1996)	Puncak Kasih (1997)	Best of Ziana Zain (1998)

Singles from Puncak Kasih
- 1. "Puncak Kasih" Released: May 5, 1997; 2. "Kalau Mencari Teman" Released: July 21, 1997; 3. "Berpisah Jua" Released: September 8, 1997; 4. "Ada Cinta" Released: December 1, 1997; 5. "Terlerai Kasih" Released: January 12, 1998; 6. "Satu Detik" Released: May 25, 1998

Puncak Kasih is the fourth studio album by Malaysian singer Ziana Zain. It was released on May 26, 1997, through BMG. Puncak Kasih showed a further progression of Ziana's music. Throughout the project she collaborated with Adnan Abu Hassan, who wrote and produced "Puncak Kasih", among others. In total, Ziana worked on the album with fourteen producers and a variety of songwriters and musicians.

Puncak Kasih became Ziana's best-selling album and one of the best-selling albums in Malaysia, with sales of more than 130 thousand copies, including twelve thousand copies in the Singapore and over eight thousand in the Brunei. In Indonesia, it has sold over five thousand units. It topped the charts around the Southeast Asia, including number one in the Malaysia, Singapore, Brunei and many more. It was certified 3× Platinum in Malaysia.

Six singles were released from the album. The major success came with the release of "Puncak Kasih" (number one in the Malaysia, Singapore and Brunei), "Berpisah Jua" (number one in Malaysia, Singapore and number five in the Indonesia), and "Terlerai Kasih" (top ten in Malaysia, including number four in the Singapore).

== Track listing ==
1. "Puncak Kasih" (Adnan Abu Hassan, Maya Sari) — 5:32
2. "Sepi Tanpa Rela" (Johari Teh) — 4:19
3. "Berpisah Jua" (Asmin Mudin) — 5:10
4. "Satu Detik" (Azlan Abu Hassan, Maya Sari) — 3:38
5. "Cinta Di Menara Rindu" (Idzahar, Azam Dungun) — 5:17
6. "Dugaan Buatmu" (Adnan Abu Hassan, Amran Omar) — 5:17
7. "Kalau Mencari Teman" (Razman, Habsah Hassan) — 4:22
8. "Tika Naik Tika Jatuh" (Iraas Irma, Fitri Amri) — 5:57
9. "Ada Cinta" (Azlan Abu Hassan, Ning Baizura) — 4:15
10. "Terlerai Kasih" (Johari Teh) — 4:13
11. "Sangkar Cinta (Remix)" - CD Only (Idzahar, Azam Dungun) — 5:09

== Commercial performance ==
Puncak Kasih debuted at number 4 on the week ending 10 June 1997. The following week, it jumped to number two. On its third week, the album finally topped the Malaysian Album Chart, dethroning 911's The Journey on the week ending 24 June 1997.

== Awards ==
=== Anugerah Juara Lagu ===
Three singles from the album were shortlisted in the semi-final of 1998's Anugerah Juara Lagu, namely "Puncak Kasih", "Kalau Mencari Teman" and "Berpisah Jua". Nevertheless, the latter failed to advance into the final. Additionally, the song "Puncak Kasih" won the category Best Ballad Song in the ceremony.

Year	Nominee / work	Award	Result
1998	"Puncak Kasih"	Best Ballad Song	Won
1998	"Puncak Kasih"	Best Song	Shortlisted
1998	"Berpisah Jua"	Best Ballad Song	Shortlisted
1998	"Berpisah Jua"	Best Song	Shortlisted
1998	"Kalau Mencari Teman"	Best Traditional Song	Shortlisted
1998	"Kalau Mencari Teman"	Best Song	Shortlisted

=== Anugerah Industri Muzik ===
In 1998, the album Puncak Kasih received two nominations in Anugerah Industri Muzik which were Best Pop Album as well as Best Female Vocalist in an Album where it won Best Pop Album. Additionally, the song Puncak Kasih was nominated for Best Song award but it lost to Innuendo's "Selamanya".

Year	Nominee / work	Award	Result
1998	Puncak Kasih	Best Pop Album	Won
1998	Puncak Kasih	Best Female Vocalist in an Album	Nominated
1998	"Puncak Kasih"	Best Song	Nominated

=== Anugerah Video Muzik ===
Year	Nominee / work	Award	Result
1998	"Puncak Kasih"	Most Popular Video Clip	Won

== Personnel ==
- Executive producer - Mohd Firhad
- A & R executive - Asni
- Mastering Engineer - Saari Amri, Johari Teh, Adnan Abu Hassan, Fauzi Marzuki, Raman
- Promotion unit - Samirah Hambali, Asri Ismail, Shila, Man Toba, Rouslan, Rohani, Eddie & Nora
- Photographer - Adam Photo
- Make-up - Kayla Adzman
- Jewelry - Kedai Emas Golden Chance Lot 1.80 Ampang Park Complex
- Cover artwork & photography - Bombay (KC Sdn. Bhd.)
- Graphic design - Shairul (KC Sdn. Bhd.)

== Charts ==
Chart (1997)	Peak Position
Malaysian Albums Chart (RIAM)	1
