= Hani Mohsin =

Malaysian actor, host and producer (1965–2006)

- Born: Hani Mohsin bin Mohd. Hanafi; 18 June 1965; Kangar, Perlis, Malaysia
- Died: 25 July 2006 (aged 41); Hospital Serdang, Kajang, Selangor
- Resting place: Ulu Kelang Muslim Cemetery
- Occupations: Actor, host, producer
- Years active: 1990–2006
- Spouse: Tiara Jacquelina (m. 1993; div. 1998)
- Children: 1

Hani Mohsin Mohd. Hanafi (18 June 1965 – 25 July 2006) was a Malaysian actor, host and producer. He best known as the host of the popular TV game show Roda Impian, the Malaysian version of Wheel of Fortune.

He died on 25 July 2006 at the age of 41 due to a heart attack; Roda Impian ended its production as a symbol of respect for his death. It aired a brief revival in 2009 with former Era radio presenter, Maskiran Jakiran (Kieran) as host; the show has been on indefinite hiatus since 2010.

He was previously married to actress Tiara Jacquelina, from 11 September 1993 until their divorce on 16 February 1998. They have a daughter, Hani Karmila, who is also an actress. Hani was buried beside the grave of his mother, Hasni Bakar at the Ulu Klang Muslim cemetery.

== Filmography ==
=== Film ===
Year	Title	Role	Notes
1991	Operasi Cegah Jenayah (O.C.J)		
1992	Nadia	Izam	
1993	Hanny	Jeff	
1995	Jimi Asmara	Jimi Asmara	
1995	Beyond Rangoon	Young Monk / Soldier	
1995	Ringgit Kasorrga	Mat	
1996	Scoop	Shah Ikhwan	
1996	Merah	Salleh	
2001	Spinning Gasing	Azri	
2002	Embun	Abang Bayu	
2006	Man Laksa	Inspector Mohsin	

=== Television series ===
Year	Title	Role	TV channel	Notes
1990	Tapak Gemilang			Also as producer
1990	Naik Tangga Turun Tangga	Ishak	TV3	
1999	Romeo & Juliet	Ridzwan	TV3	
1999	Bulan Bintang Capricon	Rezza		
2001	Ketupat Madu, Rendang Hempedu	Azam		
2004	Mama Paparazzi		TV3	
2005	Villa Cinta Daddy	Kamal	TV3	

=== Telemovie ===
Year	Title	Role	TV channel	Notes
1995	Tamak		TV1	
1999	Jam 2 Petang	Abang We	VCD	Also as executive producer
2001	Duda	Zainab		
2001	Sadis	Mustafa		
2002	Histeria	Johan	VCD	
2002	Enamorata			
2002	Bunga Kasturi			
2003	Pontianak - Bidan Gayah	Bidin	VCD	
2003	Hijrahku	Hafiz	TV3	
2003	Snowhite Pudarnya Suria			
2003	Diantara Satu			
2003	Neon	Exhibition Room Visitors I	VCD	
2004	Cinta Sepahit Kayu Manis	Zaris	TV1	

=== Television ===
Year	Title	Role	TV channel
1990	Senada Seirama	Host	TV1
2002–2006	Roda Impian	Host	Astro Ria
