= Canggung Mendonan =

Studio album by M. Nasir
- Released: 22 December 1993
- Recorded: 1992–1993
- Genres: Ballad; Nusantara
- Length: 63:29
- Label: BMG Music Malaysia

M. Nasir chronology
Saudagar Mimpi (1992)	Canggung Mendonan (1993)	Srikandi Cintaku (1999)

Canggung Mendonan (Awkward Immigrant) is the fourth studio album by Malaysian singer-songwriter, M. Nasir, released on 22 December 1993 by BMG Music Malaysia.

== Production ==
The album's title, according to M. Nasir, means the immigrant. 'Changgung' means awkward while 'Mendonan' means immigrant. He said about the album's title: "It is for the alienated, and addressed to anyone who feels alienated". As a composer, M. Nasir felt that it is his responsibility to popularise Malay language through songs. He explained, "There are many classic words that were once used by the people of Riau but have now been left out". 50 percent of the album's recording was done in Australia.

== Release and reception ==
Canggung Mendonan was released on 22 December 1993. Four songs in the album: "Mentera Semerah Padi", "Tanya Sama Itu Hud Hud", "Sentuhan Listrikmu" dan "Bonda" was released as singles.

== Track listing ==
All tracks are written by M. Nasir except where noted.

No.	Title	Writer(s)	Length
1.	"Mentera Semerah Padi"		4:55
2.	"Aduhai Kasih! Aduhai"		5:15
3.	"Secangkir Kopi Semanis Puan"	M. Nasir, Loloq	4:48
4.	"Wadi"		5:55
5.	"Anak-Anak Kita"		5:19
6.	"Tanya Sama Itu Hud Hud"		5:10
7.	"Sentuhan Listrikmu"		5:10
8.	"Lara"	M. Nasir, Nurbisa	4:50
9.	"Bukalah Hatimu"		5:30
10.	"Perangi Yang Lagi Satu"		5:03
11.	"Ada"		4:26
12.	"Bonda"	M. Nasir, Nurbisa	5:40
Total length:			63:29

== Certifications ==
Region	Certifications	Certified units/sales
Malaysia	Platinum	—

== Release history ==
Region	Release date	Format	Label
Malaysia	22 December 1993	CD, cassette, digital download, streaming media	BMG Music Malaysia
