= Ratu Agung =

District in Bengkulu, Indonesia

- District
- Interactive map of Ratu Agung
- Coordinates: 3°48′27.74333″S 102°16′42.22862″E
- Country: Indonesia
- Province: Bengkulu
- City: Bengkulu City

Area
  - Total: 11.02 km^{2} (4.25 sq mi)

Population (2020)
  - Total: 50,562
  - Density: 4,588/km^{2} (11,880/sq mi)
- Time zone: UTC+07:00 (Western Indonesia Time)
- Postal code: 38223 - 38228

Ratu Agung is an administrative district (kecamatan) in Bengkulu City, Bengkulu Province, Indonesia.
