= M. Nasir =

Singaporean/Malaysian poet, singer, actor and film director (born 1957)

Yang Hormat Dato' M. Nasir DIMP AMN
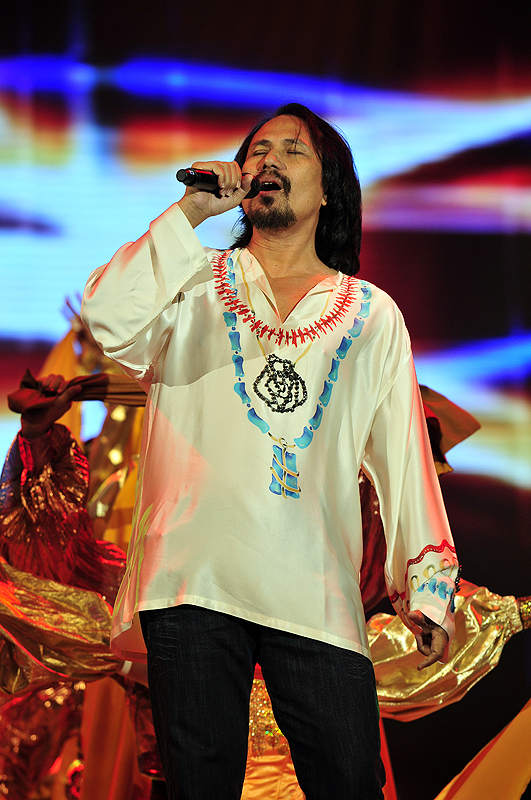
- Nasir performing during the 2008 Anugerah Juara Lagu
- Born: Mohamad Nasir bin Mohamed Sam; 4 July 1957 (age 69); Bukit Panjang, Singapore
- Other name: Mohamad M.N. (briefly in 1979)
- Occupations: Singer-songwriter, composer, writer producer, actor, film director
- Years active: 1979–present
- Spouses: Junainah Johari (m. 1980; died 1998) Datin Marlia Musa (m. 2000)
- Children: 6
- Musical career
- Genres: Nusantara; R&B; etnik kreatif; Irama Malaysia; pop tradisional; Heavy Metal
- Instrument: Vocals
- Label: Luncai Emas
- Website: luncaiemas.com.my

Mohamad Nasir bin Mohamed Sam (born 4 July 1957) is a Singaporean born poet, singer-songwriter, composer, producer, actor and film director also known as a Sifu in the Malaysian music industry.

== Early life ==
M. Nasir was born on July 4, 1957, in Bukit Panjang, Singapore. He is the fourth of nine siblings. His father, Mohamed Sam, came from Pagoh, Muar in Johor and emigrated to Singapore as he was employed as a firefighter with the Singapore Civil Defence Force, whilst his mother is a Singaporean Malay.

After Singapore was expelled from the Malaysian Federation in 1965, his family obtained Singaporean citizenship and began his early education at both Bukit Panjang Primary School as well as the Bukit Panjang Government High School until finishing his GCE O-Level exams. After studying at the Boys Town Vocational Institute, he attended the Nanyang Academy of Fine Arts and graduated with a diploma in Western painting in 1978.

== Career ==
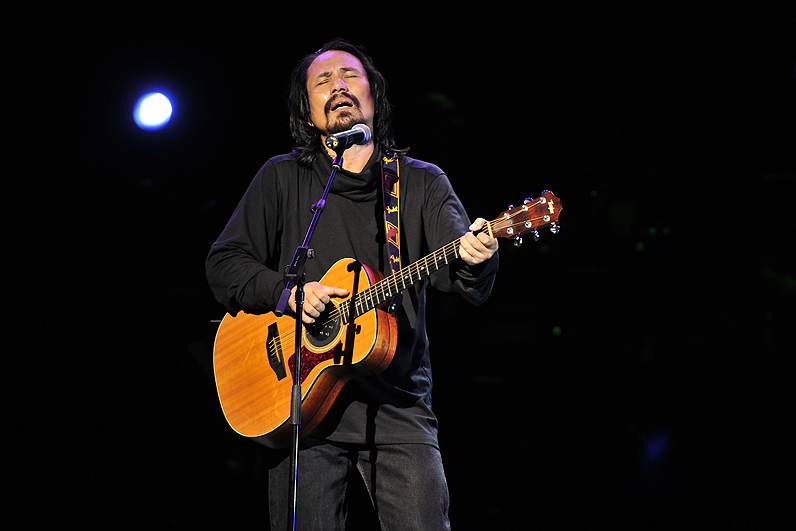
Nasir performing at the Konsert Alam Muzik M. Nasir at Istana Budaya in 2009.

M. Nasir had been deeply exposed to music not only through listening to the radio but also through his elder brother who had brought him purchased records of bands such as Bob Dylan, Queen, Al Stewart and Led Zeppelin while they were growing up in Singapore in the 1960s and 1970s.

He was roped into music making in 1978 when a friend of his Wan Ibrahim, then executive producer of PolyGram Singapore, invited him to write song lyrics for the band Alleycats, who were rising in popularity at that time.

Nasir decided to venture into singing, releasing his debut album Untuk Pencinta Seni under the name of Mohamad M.N. in 1979, which ended up being a flop. He moved on to form the folk rock act Kembara in 1981 with A. Ali, S. Sahlan and siblings Abby and Eddie Ali. The Ali siblings however left the group in its infancy due to disagreements on picking the band's genre.

Kembara released their own self-titled debut album, which became a commercial success with 25,000 copies sold. The band went on to release six albums and before disbanding in late 1985.

After Kembara disbanded, Nasir went solo again. In 1989, he released his second solo album, S.O.L.O. under PMC/BMG. This was his first solo album in 10 years since Untuk Pencinta Seni (1979) and the first to be registered under his present name. He went on record five more solo albums – namely Saudagar Mimpi (1992), Canggung Mendonan (1993), Srikandi Cintaku (1999), Phoenix Bangkit (2001) and Sang Pencinta (2006), all of which became commercial successes. Though Nasir announced that he will release an 8th studio album, it did not materialise.

He also dabbles in the art of painting, particularly abstract art. He has conducted several exhibitions on his canvas works; the first being Tanda in 2014 and Tanda II in 2015, both in Shah Alam.

== Personal life ==
Nasir moved with his family to Malaysia in 1982, where he became a naturalised citizen in 1990.

He married Junainah Johari (born 1962), who was the lead singer of Ideal Sisters, Singapore's earliest girl group on September 12, 1980. Their relationship – from which they have five children namely Ilham, Yasin, Hidayat, Syafi'i and Nurnilam Sari – lasted until Junainah's death on 8 August 1998 due to asthma. Nasir's second marriage not long after in 2000 was with actress Marlia Musa (born 1969), a native of Johor Bahru, and they both have a daughter named Suci Musalmah.

His children are also involved in music making: Ilham, Yasin and Hidayat make up the band Pitahati while Syafi'i is a member of the psychedelic rock band Ramayan.

His father, Mohamed Sam (born 1925), died on 28 January 2021 due to natural causes at the age of 96. Nasir was unable to return to Singapore to attend his father's funeral due to COVID-19 restrictions. This was followed by his mother, Aesah Yahya (born 1933) who died on 26 March 2023 at the age of 90, also due to natural causes and old age.

== Partial discography ==
=== With Kembara ===
- Kembara (1981)
- Perjuangan (1982)
- Generasi Ku (1983)
- Seniman Jalanan (1984)
- 1404 Hijrah (1984)
- Duit (1985)
- Lagu-Lagu Dari Filem Kembara Seniman Jalanan (1986)

=== Solo albums ===
- Untuk Pencinta Seni (1979)
- Irama M. Nasir – instrumental LP (1982)
- S.O.L.O. (1989)
- Saudagar Mimpi (1992)
- Canggung Mendonan (1993)
- Srikandi Cintaku (1999)
- Phoenix Bangkit (2001)
- Sang Pencinta (2006)

=== Duet album(s) ===
- Dia Ibuku – with Yunizar Hussein (1981)

=== Compilation albums ===
- Best Of Kembara (2001)
- Best of M. Nasir Dengan Kembara (2001)

== Filmography ==
=== Film ===
Year	Title	Role	Notes
1986	Kembara Seniman Jalanan	Bujang	Also as writer and composer
1986	Balik Kampung	Album Producer	
1990	Fenomena	Azlan	
1992	Selubung	Kamal	
1993	Balada	Desa	
1994	Simfoni Duniaku	Iskandar	
1996	Merah	Hassan	Also as director and co-writer
1999	Perempuan Melayu Terakhir	Stage Actor	
2001	Putih	Prince Aftus	Voice only
2004	Puteri Gunung Ledang	Hang Tuah	
2010	Magika	Naga Tasik Chini (the Chini Lake Dragon)	
2014	Yasmine	Datuk Raja Nan Hitam	Brunei movie
2017	Tombiruo: Penunggu Rimba	Tan Sri Berham	
2022	Rajawali	Komang	
2023	Imam	Haji Mihad	
2025	Ejen Ali: The Movie 2	Cero	Voice only

=== Television ===
Year	Title	Role	TV channel	Notes
2005	Akademi Fantasia (season 3)	Himself (Principal)	Astro Ria	Reality TV show
2017–2021	Omar & Hana	Atuk	Astro Ceria	
2019-2025	Sepahtu Reunion Live	Cameo/Guest Artist	Astro Warna	

=== Television series ===
Year	Title	Role	TV channel
2000	Salam Taj Mahal	Master Ji	TV3
2018	Dosa: Sacred Sin	Latif	Astro First Exclusive
2023	Special Force: Anarchy	Umar	Disney+ Hotstar

== Awards and achievements ==
Year	Award	Category	Nominee(s) and recipient(s)	Results
1984	Malaysia Film Festival	Best Song	"Sandarkan Kepada Kenangan" – from the movie Azura	Won
1990	Malaysia Film Festival	Best Song	Istana Menanti	
1990	Malaysia Film Festival	Best Original Film Score	Fenomena	
1994	Anugerah Juara Lagu	Best Irama Malaysia Song	"Bonda"	Won
1994	Anugerah Juara Lagu	Best Pop Rock Song	"Tanya Sama Itu Hudhud"	Won
1994	Anugerah Juara Lagu	Best Performance	"Tanya Sama Itu Hudhud"	Won
1994	Anugerah Juara Lagu	Overall Best Song of the Year	"Tanya Sama Itu Hudhud"	Won
1994	Malaysian Video Awards	Silver Award	"Mentera Semerah Padi"	Won
1995	Anugerah Bintang Popular	Most Popular Artiste		Won
1997	Anugerah Skrin TV3	Best Film	Merah	Won
2001	Anugerah Planet Muzik	Popular Male Artiste		Won
2001	Anugerah Planet Muzik	Best Male Artiste		Won
2001	Anugerah Planet Muzik	Best Album	Phoenix Bangkit	Won
2001	Anugerah Bintang Popular	Most Popular Male Singer		Won
2001	Anugerah Industri Muzik	Best Male Vocal Performance	Srikandi Cintaku	
2001	Anugerah Industri Muzik	Best Rock Album Producer	AKU – by Amy Search	
2002	Anugerah Indusri Muzik	WIRAMA Award – honorary award for great contributions towards the Malaysian music Industry		Won
2012	Angerah Juara Lagu	Best Song	Awan Nano – performed by Hafiz	Won

=== Other honours ===
- 1994: Awarded the Ahli Mangku Negara (A.M.N.) by the then-Yang di-Pertuan Agong, Tuanku Jaafar ibni Almarhum Tuanku Abdul Rahman.
- 2001: Awarded the Ahli Mahkota Pahang (A.M.P) by the Sultan of Pahang, Ahmad Shah.
- 2012: Awarded the ‘Darjah Indera Mahkota Pahang’ by the Sultan of Pahang, which grants the title of "Dato'".
- 2014: Conferred the Honorary Degree of Doctor of Philosophy (Creative Industries Management) by Universiti Utara Malaysia.
- 2022: Conferred the Honorary Doctorate in Performance by Universiti Pendidikan Sultan Idris.
