= Ratu, Nepal =

Ratu, Nepal रातु
- Village development committee
- Location in Nepal
- Coordinates: 28.65°N 81.70°E
- Country: Nepal
- Zone: Bheri Zone
- District: Surkhet District

Population (1991)
  - Total: 1,458
- Time zone: UTC+5:45 (Nepal Time)

Ratu is a village development committee in Surkhet District in the Bheri Zone of mid-western Nepal. At the time of the 1991 Nepal census it had a population of 1458 people living in 248 individual households.
