= Suria (radio station) =

Radio station in Malaysia

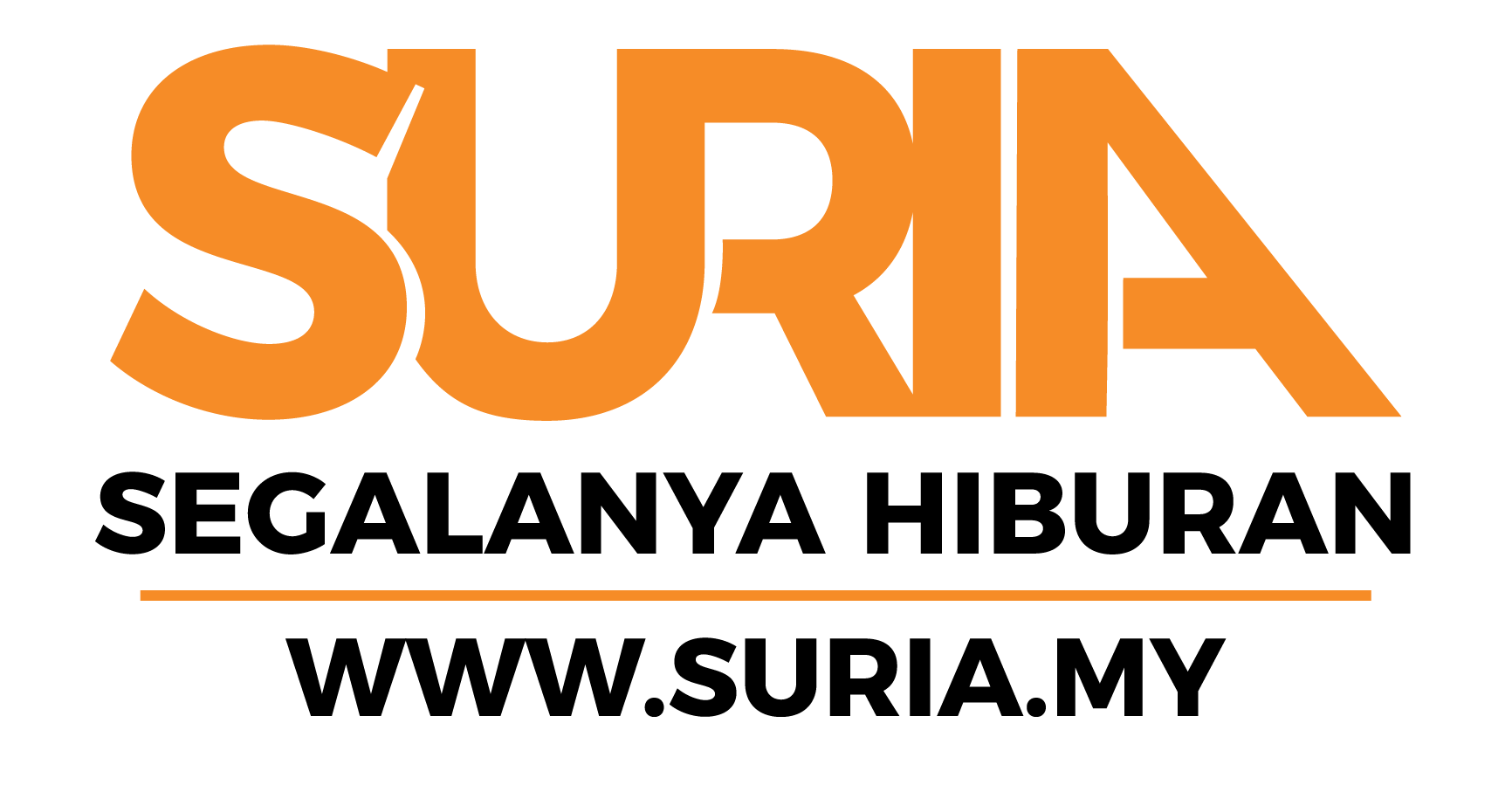

Petaling Jaya; Malaysia
- Broadcast area: Peninsular Malaysia and Singapore

Programming
- Language: Malay
- Format: Talk, mixed contemporary hit & adult contemporary radio
- Affiliations: Star Media Radio Group

Ownership
- Owner: Star Media Group Berhad
- Sister stations: 988 FM

History
- First air date: 24 November 2005; 20 years ago
- Former frequencies: 105.9 FM (Kota Kinabalu)

Links
- Website: suria.my

Suria (formerly known as Suria FM) is a Malay language private radio station under the Star Media Radio Group, a company owned by Star Media Group Berhad. Suria FM first aired on 24 November 2005. The station's programming targets modern Malays aged between 25 and 35 and engages with listeners through social media. The broadcasts feature a mix of local all-time favourites, chart-topping hits, and some of the latest Indonesian and English K-pop songs.

== History ==
As of 2018, Suria remains one of the top five Malay-language radio stations of choice.

On 9 November 2019, Suria ceased transmission in Kota Kinabalu, Sabah.

== Notable announcers ==
=== Current ===
- Ajak
- Fad
- Elly Arifin
- Feeya Iskandar
- Chiwan
- Kai Hassan
- Irsyad Tarudin
- Roslinda Abdul Majid (DJ Lin)

=== Former ===
- Adibah Noor (died in June 2022)
- Baki Zainal
- Halim Othman
- Linda Onn
- Nabil Ahmad
- Kenchana Devi
- Shahrol Shiro
- Issey Fazlisham
- Fizi Ali
- Anna Aljuffrey
- Shuib
- Tyzo Xander
- Sharifah Shahira (Rara)
- Dato' Fizz Fairuz
- Suraya Borhan

== Frequency ==
Frequencies	Area	Transmitter
105.3 MHz	Klang Valley	Gunung Ulu Kali
106.9 MHz	Perlis, Alor Setar, Kedah and Penang	Mount Jerai
91.7 MHz	Taiping, Perak	Bukit Larut
96.0 MHz	Ipoh, Perak	Gunung Kledang
107.0 MHz	Seremban, Negeri Sembilan	Gunung Telapak Buruk
88.5 MHz	Malacca	Mount Ledang
101.4 MHz	Johor Bahru, Johor and Singapore	Mount Pulai
96.1 MHz	Kuantan, Pahang	Bukit Pelindung
102.4 MHz	Kuala Terengganu, Terengganu	Bukit Jerung
106.1 MHz	Kota Bharu, Kelantan	Telipot
