= Paya Jaras =

Human settlement in Malaysia

Coordinates: 3.2017349°N 101.5473128°E

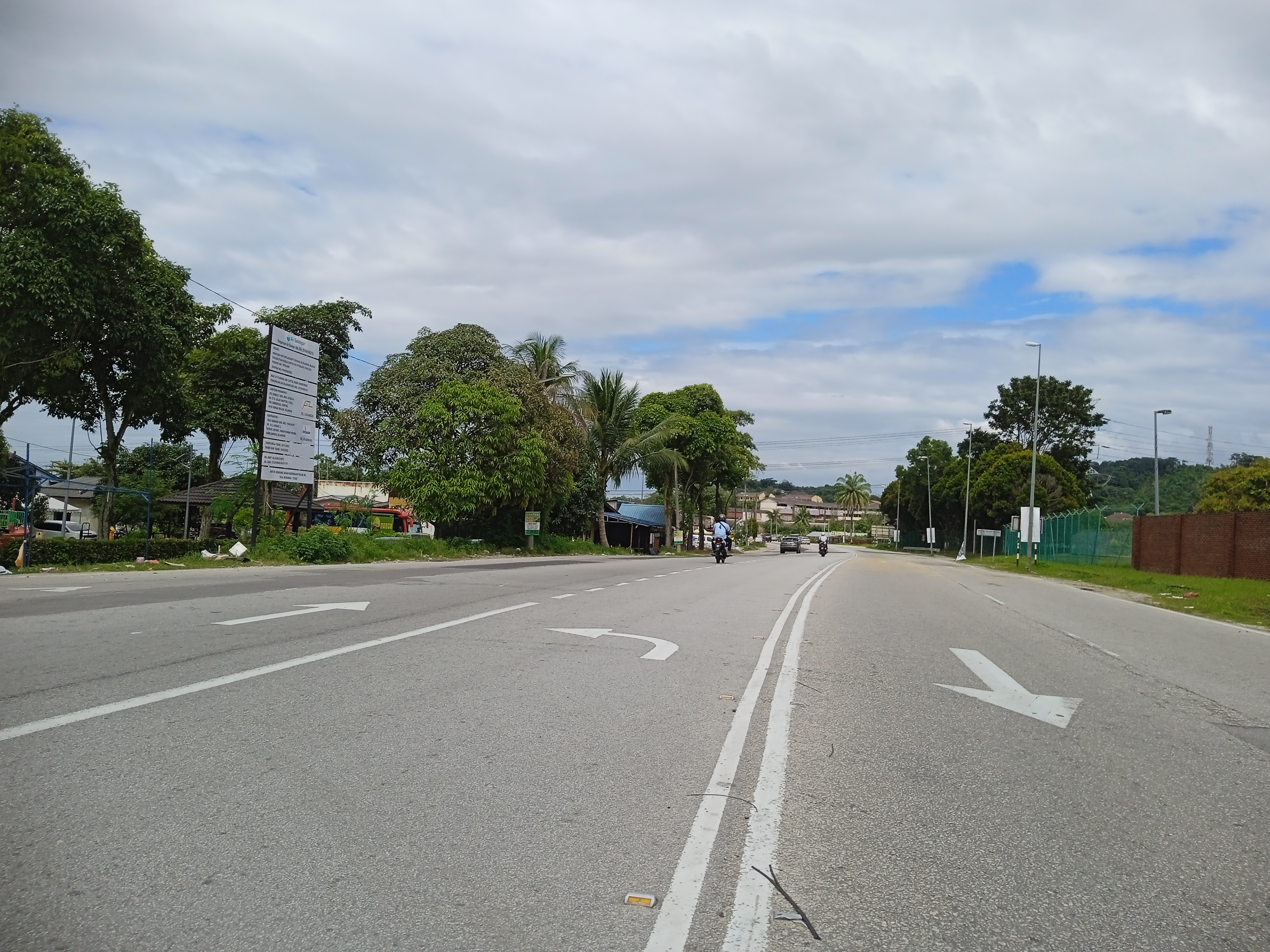
Federal Route 54 (Jalan Kuala Selangor) at Paya Jaras

Paya Jaras is a town in Selangor, Malaysia. The first village head to open the village of Paya Jaras was Baie bin Duawan, of Malay descent from Padang, Indonesia who came to Malaysia around the early 20s. Remembering his sacrifice and service, one road bears his name, Haji Baie Road, located in Kampung Paya Jaras Hulu which consists of four villages: Kampung Paya Jaras Dalam, Kampung Paya Jaras Tengah, Kampung Paya Jaras Hulu and Kampung Paya Jaras Hilir.

Paya Jaras has a mix of traditional villages and a new village, as well as a number of residential areas. The middle to upper-class areas are Bukit Rahman Putra, Sierramas and Valencia, while the middle-class areas include Aman Puri and Taman Sri Buloh. The lower-income residents are found in Aman Puri and Matang Jaya.

== Transportation ==
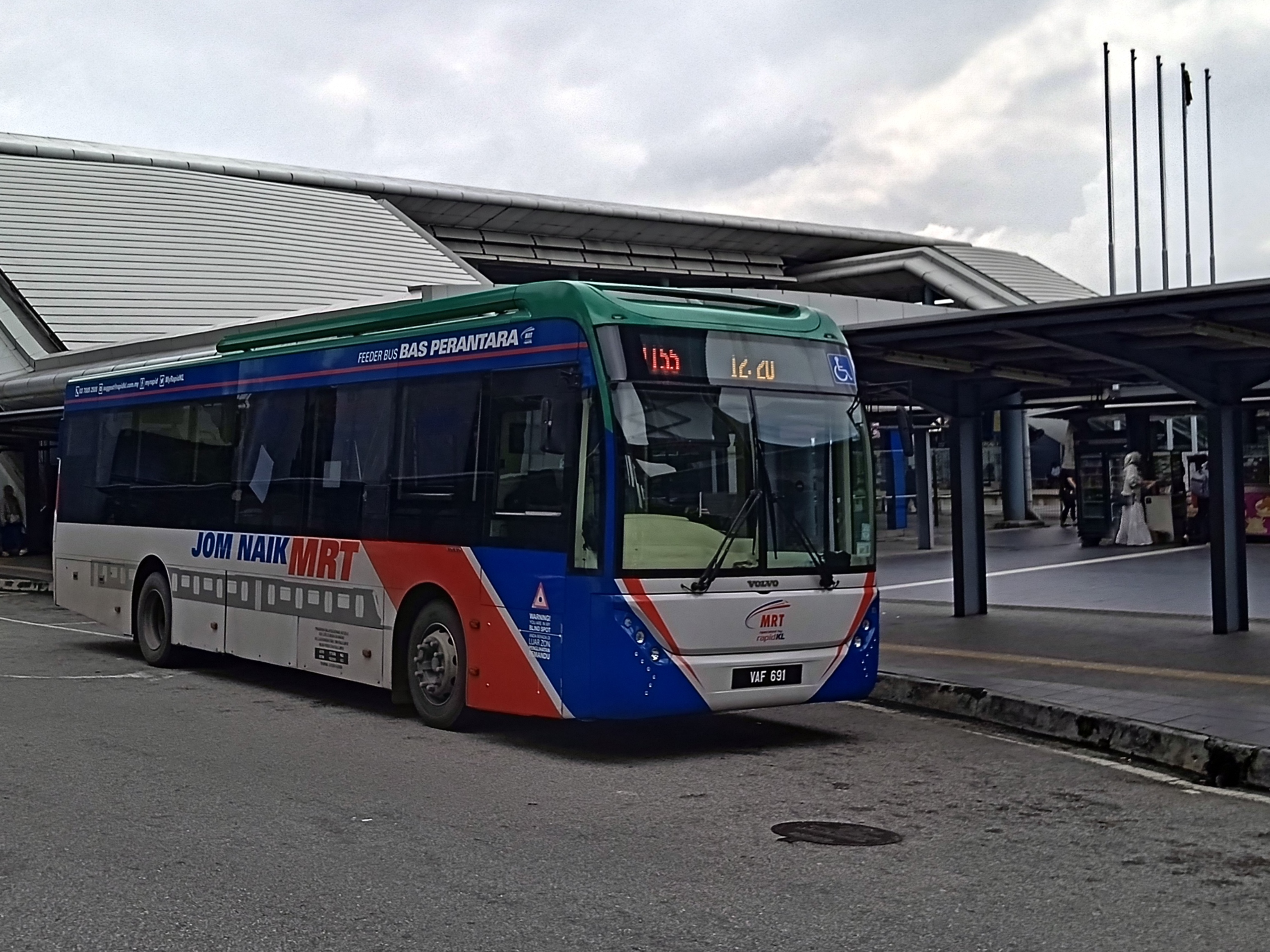
Rapid KL bus route T155 at Sungai Buloh MRT station, 2023.

The area is accessible by Rapid KL MRT feeder bus (Bas Perantara MRT) route T155 from Sungai Buloh MRT station to Kota Puteri and T102 from Sungai Buloh MRT Station to Aman Putri via Kampung Kubu Gajah.
