= Ziana Zain =

Malaysian singer and actress (born 1968)

Yang Berbahagia Datuk Ziana Zain DPSM
- زيانة زين
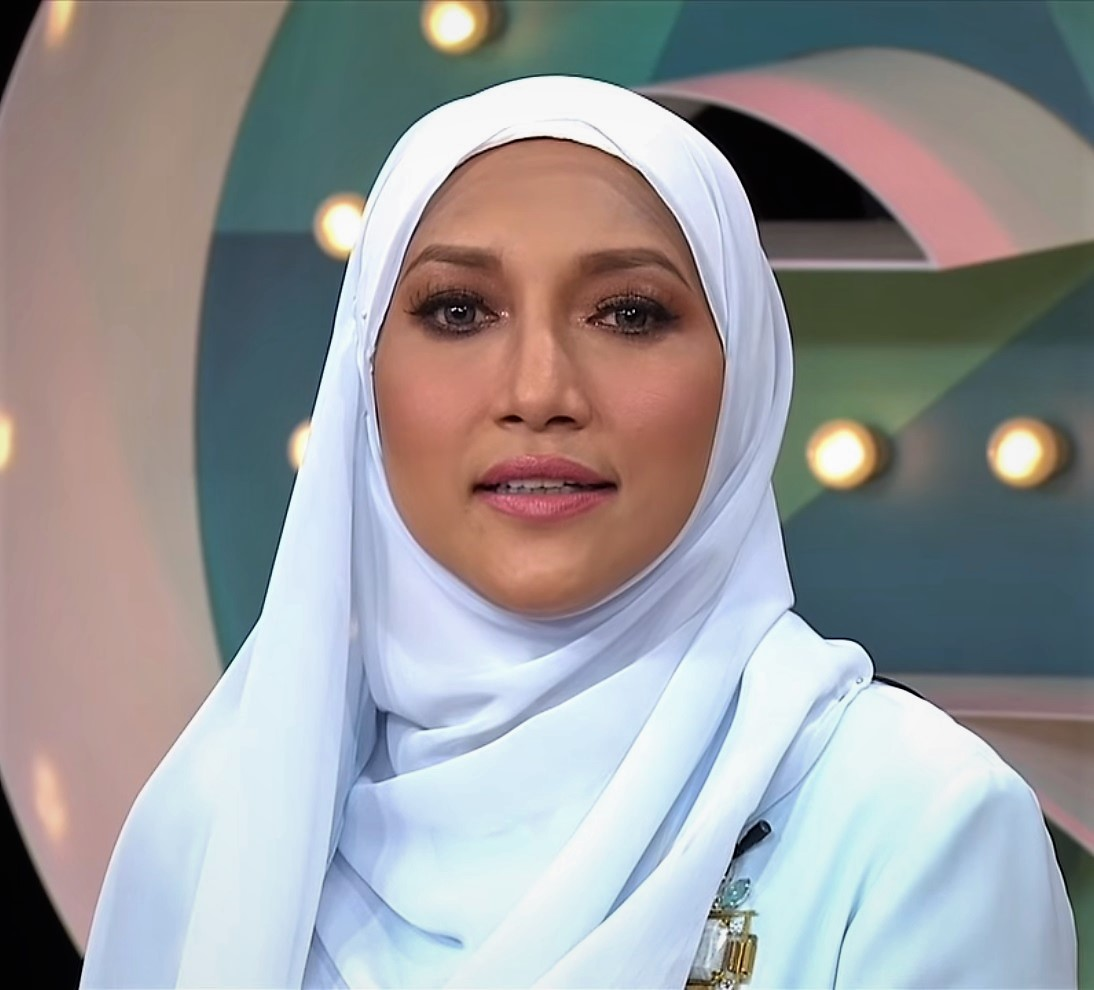
- Ziana in 2015
- Born: Siti Roziana binti Zain; 2 May 1968 (age 58); Kampung Sempang, Merlimau, Melaka, Malaysia
- Occupations: Singer; actress
- Years active: 1989–present
- Spouse: Armin Zaharin (m. 1998; div. 2018)
- Parents: Zain Abdullah (father); Robiah Abdul (mother)
- Relatives: Anuar Zain (brother); Ernie Zakri (niece)
- Awards: Full list
- Musical career
- Genres: Pop; Ballad; R&B; Pop rock; Soft rock
- Instruments: Vocals
- Labels: Sony; KRU; EMI; BMG; CBS

Siti Roziana binti Zain (born 2 May 1968) is a Malaysian pop singer and actress. Her music career began in the early '90s with her signature single, "Madah Berhelah" followed by hits like "Terlerai Kasih", "Setia Ku Di Sini" and "Puncak Kasih". In 1995, she was crowned Voice of Asia in Kazakhstan.

== Career ==
=== 1990–1992 ===
Ziana Zain signed a contract to record an album under BMG Asia Pacific (which has now become BMG Music). In 1991, she released her debut album Madah Berhelah and the hits single is "Madah Berhelah". It is a song about a jilted lover who was deceived by empty promises delivered through poetry and sweet words. Her subsequent singles from the same album, Riwayat Cinta, Dalam Kesakitan ini and Rentak Hidupku totally sealed her place as a singer who has powerful voice with wide octave range.

=== 1993–1997 ===
Ziana's second album, Ziana Zain was released in 1993 and sold more than 85,000 copies. The album featured one foreign language track, "Chitose Bashi". The singles of the album included "Anggapanmu" and "Putus Terpaksa".

Her third album, Setia Ku Di Sini was released later in 1995 and she worked very closely with local composers. The album was certified 3× Platinum by RIM with 175,000 copies being sold. The album garnered her the "Best Female Vocalist in an Album" award at 1996's Anugerah Industri Muzik award. Ziana released five singles from the album and the lead single, "Kemelut Di Muara Kasih", was another commercial success. Four other singles, "Bersama Akhirnya", "Setia Ku Di Sini", "Sangkar Cinta" and "Tiada Kepastian" and the famous track on the album is Tuduhan and Antara Ikhlas dan Paksa went to top significant charts across Malaysia, Indonesia, Singapore and Brunei. The song "Bersama Akhirnya" garnered her the Best Solo Performance award in Pujaan 10 Nescafe.

Ziana released her fourth album, Puncak Kasih, on 28 May 1997. It won Best Pop Album in 1998's Anugerah Industri Muzik. The lead single of the album, "Puncak Kasih", was a success. It managed to stay at No. 1 in Carta Muzik Muzik for 15 consecutive weeks. The song also won Best Ballad Song in 1998's Anugerah Juara Lagu. The other single is Satu Detik, Kalau Mencari Teman and Ada Cinta. The Music Video Ada Cinta is shotting at car park in K.L.

=== 1998–2004 ===
Her comeback album was released in 2001 right after her pregnancy. The album, Aku Cintakan Mu, sold more than 20,000 copies. The album won Best Album category in 2002's Anugerah Planet Muzik. The album received a nomination for "Best Female Vocalist in an Album" in 2002's Anugerah Industri Muzik. The album's lead single, "Menadah Gerimis", won Best Ballad Song category in 2002's Anugerah Juara Lagu award. It also won Best Song in Anugerah Planet Muzik that year, apart from being voted as the Best Pop Song Choice award in Anugerah Era. Two other singles from the album were released, namely "Bagai Gahara" and "Terkenang Jua". Both of the singles did not make it to the final round in Anugerah Juara Lagu. This album was Ziana's last studio album with BMG label.

=== Career break: 2005–2008 ===
After the release of the album, Ziana took a career break for four years without releasing any studio albums.

=== 2008–2011 ===
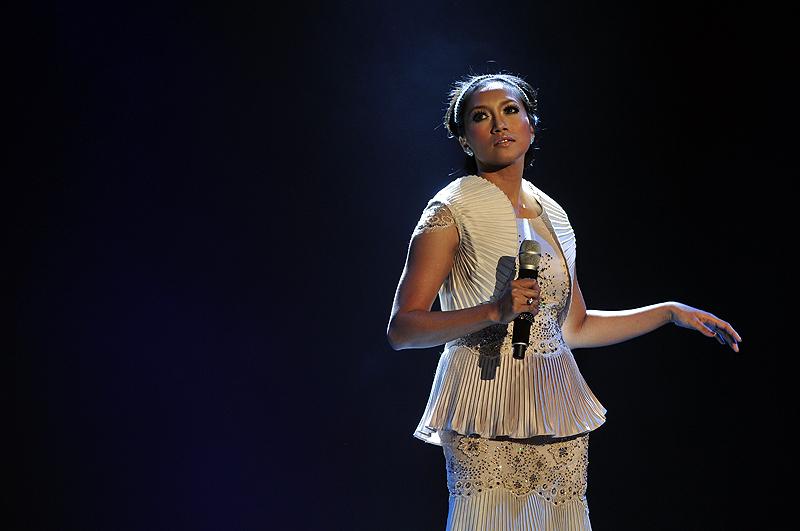
Ziana Zain performing her song "Dingin" during the final of Anugerah Juara Lagu ke-23 (23rd Champion of Song Awards) 2009 for the category of Best Ballad.

She released a mini album in 2008 entitled Dingin. The album featured four tracks and was nominated for Best Pop Song category in 2008's Anugerah Industri Muzik award. She also competed in Anugerah Juara Lagu in 2008.

In February 2009, it was confirmed that Ziana was pregnant with twins. She gave birth to twins, a boy and a girl on 23 July 2009 in Shah Alam.

In January 2010, after six months of absence, finally Ziana returned to public as a surprise guest in the second annual gathering of Murai.com to celebrate the launching of a new fashion segment, Stailista, in the web portal. In that event, she stated that she would release two new singles from her upcoming untitled album. The singles, Pawana and Dirimu Satu, were expected to be released in June 2010.

Furthermore, Ziana was one of the mentors in the fourth season of a singing competition called, Mentor. As the singing competition ended in July 2010, Ziana and her protégé, Mohd were announced as the winner for that season. With that success, they managed to take home RM 100 000 and a trophy.

For her acting career, Ziana appeared in her new film, Magika, which was directed by Edry KRU. During the preview of the film, Ziana received positive reviews on her excellent acting.

In addition, taking place in Cititel Hotel, Kuala Lumpur, Ziana Zain had been announced as a spokesperson for Slimworld Beauty House. This was the seventh years she was appointed as the ambassador of the beauty house.

Apart from singing, acting and being product ambassador, Ziana is also involved in theatrical performance. Together with fellow singer Misha Omar, she was cast in the second season of a musical theatre production entitled Teater Muzikal Gamat 2. The performance, which commenced on 12 March 2010, was held in the Auditorium of Malaysian Tourism Centre (MaTiC), Kuala Lumpur, for 11 consecutive days. This was Ziana's second participation in theatre after Musical Theater Antara.

In 2011, Ziana Zain made some controversial remarks on Malaysian artist associations where she said the participation of Malaysian celebrities in these associations is just a waste of time. According to her, associations such as the Artists Association of Malaysia (Seniman), Karyawan Association (Karyawan) and Papita only serve the interests of a selected few and therefore should be disbanded.

=== 2012 – present ===
In April 2014, Zain announced her solo concert, I Am Ziana Zain will be held in September 2014. The concert was scheduled to be held at her home state, Malacca International Trade Centre. This will be her first solo concert after 15 years. Unfortunately, due to "organizer's internal problems" the concert was cancelled.

On 15 July 2014, Zain stepped out in a new look, wearing full hijab with the approval of media outlets and fans. Zain also revealed in an interview that her upcoming album is in the works. She is working with Faizal Tahir and Awi Rafael for the new album.

== Asian Music Exposure ==
- 1989 – Sang one of the soundtrack of 15th Southeast Asia (SEA) Games
- 1992 – Selected to sing Japanese popular song, Chitose Bashi in an album Asian Voices
- 1993 – Recorded 2 English songs in Colors of Love, album involving 5 best Asian Singer
- 1993 – Performed in Asia Pop Queen Festival that held in Hiroshima and Fukuoka Japan
- 1995 – Won main award in Voice of Asia, Kazakhstan
- 1995 – Performed in Asia Live konsert, aired over Japan's NHK satellite TV Channel Two
- 1996 – Won Golden Melody Award in Japan Music Festival, Japan
- 1996 – Recorded 2 Disney's songs in an album called A Musical Salute to Disney
- 1996 – Involved in Musical Program, The Big Show in Singapore
- 1997 – Invited to OMEGA International Celebrity Club in Crans Montana, Switzerland
- 1997 – Performed in Asian Music Scene
- 1998 – Performed live during Opening 16th Commonwealth Games with the song Strive for the Best
- 2002 – Invited to St Moritz, Switzerland for her 6th appointment of OMEGA ambassador
- 2003 – Invited to Auckland, New Zealand, for OMEGA Seamaster watch launching
- 2007 – Invited to Beijing, China for FENDI Summer Fashion Show
- 2010 – Invited to Australia for Photo-shoot with Louis Vuitton products.

In 20 years in the music industry, she has collaborated with many celebrities, including Jim Brickman, Cindy Crawford, Anna Kournikova, Kate Bosworth, Shah Rukh Khan, and Ralf Schumacher.

== Discography ==
=== Studio albums ===
Year	Album	Notable Songs	Units Sold
1991	Madah Berhelah	Madah Berhelah, Riwayat Cinta	40,000
1993	Ziana Zain	Anggapanmu, Putus Terpaksa, Mimpimu Bukan Mimpiku	85,000
1995	Setia Ku Di Sini	Kemelut Di Muara Kasih, Bersama Akhirnya, Setia Ku Di Sini, Sangkar Cinta, Tiada Kepastian	180,000
1997	Puncak Kasih	Puncak Kasih, Berpisah Jua, Kalau Mencari Teman, Terlerai Kasih	150,000
1999	Ziana Zain	Syurga Di Hati Kita, Ada Suara Ada Cinta, Kesuma Hati, Penawar Semalu	50,000
2001	Aku Cintakan Mu	Menadah Gerimis, Terkenang Jua, Fatalistik, Bagai Gahara	45,000
2008	Dingin	Dingin	-

=== Compilation albums ===
- Koleksi Khas
- Best of Ziana Zain
- Ziana Zain's Choice
- Ratu – Satu Penghargaan
- Keunggulan Ziana Zain
- The Essentials

=== Live albums ===
- Ziana Zain Unplugged
- Ziana Zain No. 1s Live

=== Film soundtracks ===
- Sembilu
- Sembilu II
- Maria Mariana
- Merah
- Maria Mariana II
- Pontian Menjerik
- Sembilu 2005
- Kabhi Khusry Kabhi Igam
- Magika

=== Karaoke/VCDs ===
- Konsert Zon Perlindungan Ziana Zain
- The Best of Ziana Zain
- Balada Hits Karaoke Ziana Zain
- Karaoke Bersama Ziana Zain
- Ziana Zain Lembah Asmara: A Beautiful Love Story
- Keunggulan Ziana Zain VCD Karaoke

== Concerts ==
- 1996: Ziana Zain Unplugged Concert (Life Centre, Kuala Lumpur)
- 1998: Ziana Zain Mega Tour Concert, Peter Stuyvesant ( Malaysia, Singapore and Brunei)
- 1999: Ziana Zain: Konsert Zon Perlindungan Head & Shoulders (PWTC, Kuala Lumpur)
- 2001: ZZ in the Park (PWTC, Kuala Lumpur)
- 2002: Ziana Zain Unplugged Concert (Jerudong Park Amphitheatre, Brunei)
- 2022: Anuar Zain & Ziana Zain Live In Kuala Lumpur 2022 (Plenary Hall, Kuala Lumpur City Centre Kuala Lumpur)

== Acting career ==
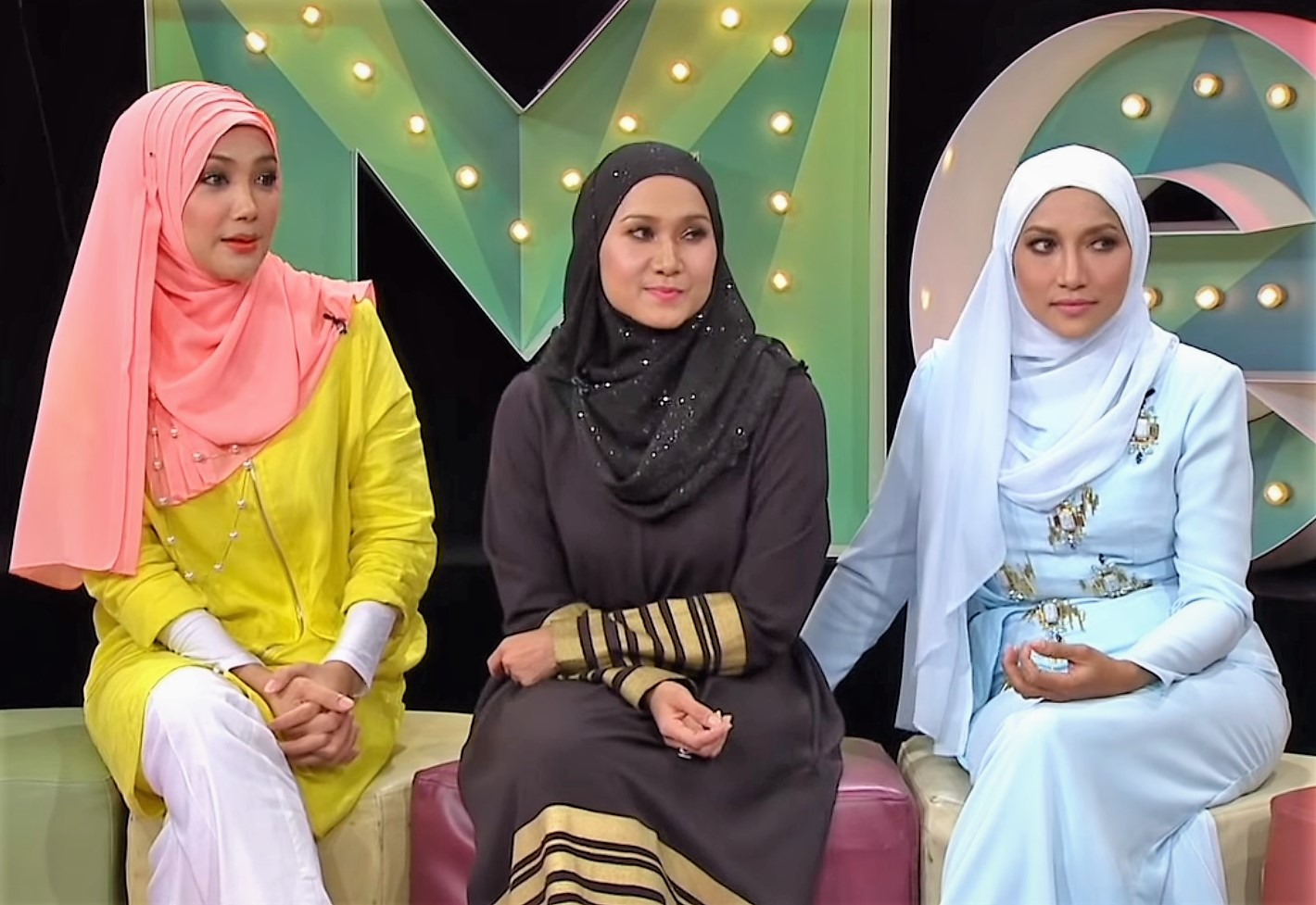
ltr:Malaysian singers and actresses Erra Fazira, Amy Mastura and Ziana Zain on MeleTOP in 2015

In addition to her music career, Ziana also diverted her focus into acting. Her acting career transpired when she was approached by Dato' Yusof Haslam. She agreed to appear in his film Sembilu, as a supporting actress with the role "Ziana". The film marked her debut as an actress. It was a successful box-office, grossing RM4.2 million. The film also helped Ziana establish herself as a successful actress, especially after winning the Most Popular Supporting Actress category in 1994's Anugerah Bintang Popular Awards, alongside her co-star Erra Fazira who was catapulted into fame after her debut appearance through this film. The film's soundtrack also featured a number of Ziana's songs including "Ku Cinta Padamu", "Anggapanmu" and "Mimpimu Bukan Mimpiku". In the 1996 Sembilu follow-up, Sembilu II, Ziana reprised her role.

Other box-office films that Ziana has performed include Maria Mariana (1996), Merah (1997), Sembilu 2005 (2005), Pontianak Menjerit (2005), and Qabil Khusry Qabil Igam (2007). Besides acting in film, Ziana also appeared in television dramas. Her first drama acting was directed by Erma Fatima entitled Cermin Pada Bulan. Ziana was the leading actress in the drama and her performance in the drama generally received notable compliments. In 2007, Ziana varied her acting skill by accepting a role in a comedy drama entitled 4 Diva Sekampung, which is about four divas who get stuck in their way back to their hometown because of their van's breakdown. The drama was screened during Hari Raya. Ziana also appeared as a leading actress in Tetamu Allah as well as her latest drama which is Nur Kasih di Jabal Rahmah. Both dramas were directed by Erma Fatima.

== Products and endorsements ==
After almost 20 years in the music industry, Ziana had been chosen as spokesperson by many international and local products. Most recently, Ziana and her family were appointed as spokesperson for a hygiene product, Antabax. This was the 11th product that has appointed Ziana as their spokesperson. Besides antabax, she has promoted:

- 1996 – Avon
- 1997 – NutriBeaute
- 1997 – Omega timepieces
- 1999 – B&H Health Products
- 1999 – Head & Shoulders Shampoo
- 2001 – Vono Mattress
- 2003 – Brilliant Rose
- 2003 – L'Oreal
- 2004 – Slim World Beauty House
- 2004 – Nutrimetics Cosmetics and Skincare
- 2010 – Antabax

In 2005, Ziana became the first Malaysian artist to release her own perfume, "Truly", which was distributed by Nutrimetics company. In addition, Ziana Zain has been an endorser of the product VONO Mattress for 10 years.

== Awards and accolades ==
=== Honours of Malaysia ===
- Melaka
  - Lieutenant of the Order of the Exalted Order of Malacca (DPSM) – Datuk (2026)

== Filmography ==
=== Film ===
Year	Title	Role	Notes
1994	Sembilu	Ziana	Debut film appearances
1995	Sembilu II	Ziana	
1996	Maria Mariana	Mariana	
1997	Merah	Kasih	
1998	Maria Mariana II	Mariana	
2005	Sembilu 2005	Marina	
2005	Pontianak Menjerit	Ziana	
2007	Qabil Khushry Qabil Igam	Rani	
2010	Magika	Nenek Kebayan	
2018	Gol & Gincu Vol: 2	Along	
2022	Seratus	Kak Siti	Cameo appearance
2024	Pontianak Kg200	Kemboja	

=== Telemovie ===
Year	Title	Role	TV channel
1998	Serunding	Cikgu Fatimah	TV3
2005	Cermin Pada Bulan	Sofea	TV3
2007	4 Diva Sekampung	Ziana	TV3
2008	Tetamu Allah	Juliana	TV1
2009	Nur Kasih Di Jabal Rahmah	Wanda	TV1
2016	Mati..Tunggu Sekejap	Nora	Astro Oasis
2017	Bisik Pada Allah	Mira	Astro Citra
2018	Datin Glam	Nona / Datin Ramona	TV3
2020	Gangguan Psiko Stalker	Puan Eza / Ibu Mikayla	Astro Citra
2021	Cincin Pusaka	Kamalia	TV9

=== Television series ===
Year	Title	Role	TV channel
2018	Mak Cun (Season 4)	Nona Mardina	TV3
2020	Janda Kosmopolitan	Wan Natelia	Awesome TV
2021	Madam E-Wallet	Siti Asmidar	TV3
2021	Kampung Kolestrol	Kak Gee	TV9
2021	Wifi Sebelah Rumah	Zetty	Disney+ Hotstar
2021	Budak Intern	Miss Jolie	TV9
2021	Cheritera	Puteri Gunung Ledang	TV9
2021	Oh My Hartawan	Kamalia	TV9
2022	Tumpang Lalu Bang	Emma	TV9
2022	Histeria The Series	Puan Nora	Astro Citra
2023	FYP: Famili Yang Popular	Bonda	Astro Ceria

=== Musical Theatre ===
Year	Title	Role	Notes
2010	Teater Muzikal Gamat 2	Ketua Obor-Obor	Lead actress
2010	Teater Muzikal Antara	Herself	Cameo

=== Television shows ===
Year	Title	Role	Notes
2017	Sepahtu Reunion Live 2017		Guest artist, episode : "Hikayat Hang Tuah"
2018	I Can See Your Voice Malaysia	Herself	Guest artist, season 1
2020	Sepahtu Reunion Live 2020		Cameo, episode: "Aishiteru Cintaku"
2022	Next To Neelofa 2	Herself	Guest artist, episode 2
