= Yakovlev Yak-55 =

Soviet aerobatic aircraft

Yak-55
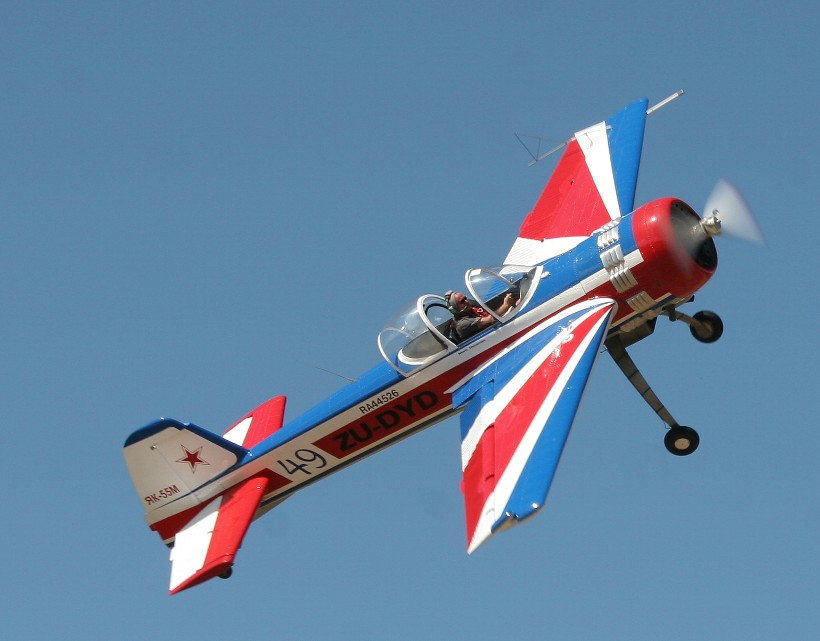
- Yak-55 performing low-level airshow aerobatics (pilot Mark Hensman)

General information
- Type: Aerobatic aircraft
- National origin: Soviet Union
- Manufacturer: Yakovlev

History
- First flight: 28 May 1981

The Yakovlev Yak-55 is a single-seat aerobatic aircraft. Pilots flying the Yak-55 have won several world aerobatic championships.

== Development ==
The 1976 World Aerobatic Championship was dominated by Soviet pilots, who finished first and second in the individual competition and also won the team and women's competitions in their Yakovlev Yak-50s. However, the Soviet pilots were also impressed by the performance of competing Western-built aircraft, which required less space than the Yak-50 to perform the same manoeuvers. A team in the Yakovlev design bureau, led by Sergei Yakovlev, and with V. P. Kondratiev and D. K. Drach as chief engineers, therefore set out to design an all-new dedicated aerobatic aircraft, unrelated to the Yak-50, which would be able to match the tight, low-speed style of Western aircraft.

The resulting design, the Yakovlev Yak-55, was a single-engined all-metal cantilever monoplane. The aircraft's wing is mounted midway up the fuselage and is of thick, symmetrical section to aid inverted flight. The pilot sits in an enclosed cockpit under a sliding teardrop canopy level with the trailing edge of the wing and with the seat below wing level. The powerplant is the same tractor configuration 360 horsepower (270 kW) Vedeneyev M14P engine driving a two-bladed V-530TA-D35 propeller, as used by the Yak-50, while the aircraft has a fixed undercarriage with titanium sprung main gear and tailwheel.

The prototype Yak-55 first flew in May 1981, was unveiled at the Moscow Tushino air show in August 1982 and displayed (but did not compete) at the 1982 World Aerobatic Championships. By this time, fashions in aerobatic flying had changed, with the high-energy aerobatics demonstrated by the Yak-50 back in fashion, leading to the Yak-55 being rejected by the Soviet team. The Yak-55 was therefore redesigned with new wings with shorter span, reduced area and a thinner but still symmetrical aerofoil section, giving an increased rate of roll and speed. (Note: Gunston blames the redesign on the need to deal with structural failures of the original wing.) Series production finally began in 1985 at Arsenyev, with 108 aircraft being delivered by 1991.

In the late 1980s, work began on a revised version of the Yak-55, the Yak-55M, to meet demands from DOSAAF for an aircraft with further increased rates of roll, and to compete with new designs from the Sukhoi design bureau. The Yak-55M had a still smaller wing, which resulted in the required improvement in roll rate. It first flew in May 1989, entering production in 1990. 106 Yak-55Ms had been built by the end of 1993, with low-rate production continuing.

== Operational use ==
The Soviet aerobatic team first used the aircraft in 1984 when they won the World Aerobatic Championship. That same year the Soviet woman's aerobatic team took first place flying the Yak-55, Kh. Makagonova winning individual gold.

The aircraft has been relatively free of Service Bulletins and Airworthiness Directives and has proved exceedingly effective in competition at all levels. The obvious capabilities of the aircraft and its success in use, together with the relatively large numbers built (about 250) have meant that owners make relatively few modifications and that few are needed.

== Variants ==
Yak-55
Prototype/initial production aerobatic aircraft. Long-span wings.
Yak-55
Revised production version with reduced wingspan and area.
Yak-55M
Further revised version, with revised wings.
Technoavia SP-55M
The SP-55M is a development of the Yak-55M by V. P. Kondratiev, one of the designers of the Yak-55 with a redesigned vertical tail, composite-covered control surfaces, a deeper aft fuselage.
Yak-56
The Yak-56 was to be a two-seat trainer based on the Yak-55M, but with a low wing and retractable undercarriage. Power was to have come from a 300 hp VOKBM M-16 8-cylinder x-8 engine driving an AV-16 three-bladed propeller. The prototype was expected to fly in 1992, but delays in producing the engine meant that Yakovlev decided to produce the Yak-54 instead.

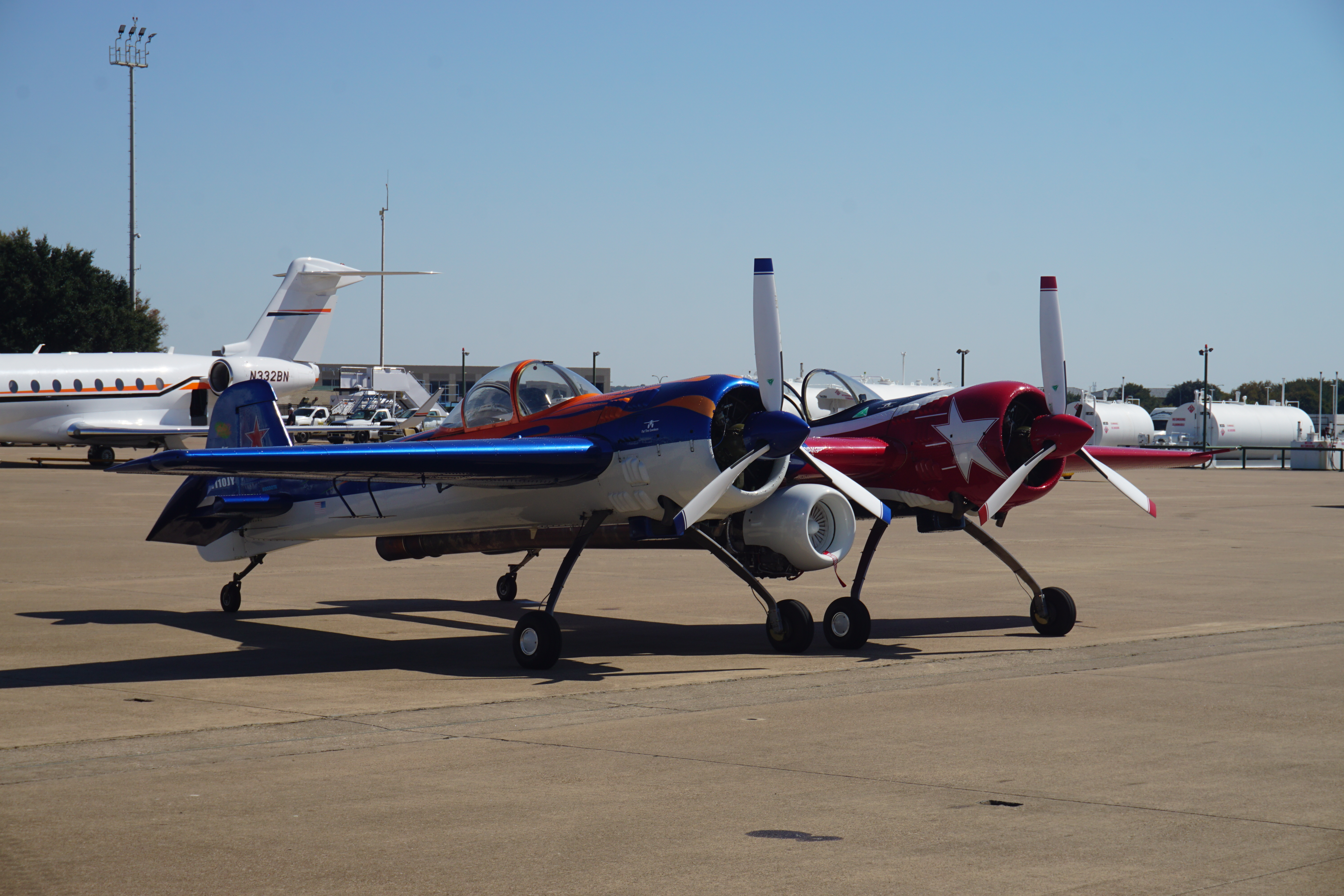
Boerboon and Bartee's "Yak-110"

Boerboon & Coller Yak-110
The Yak-110 is an American-engineered twin-fuselage aircraft made from two Yak-55 airframes, fitted with a new wing center section supporting a single General Electric J85 turbojet engine in addition to the Vedeneyev M14P propeller engines. The idea was conceived in 2016 by pilot Jeff Boerboon and mechanic Dell Coller; Boerboon owns one of the original airframes, with the other one belonging to Chad Bartee. The plane is flown with the pilot in the left-side cockpit, and is the only three-engined aircraft to be certified for unlimited aerobatics as of 2023. Its first airshow was the Gunfighter Skies in 2018 at the Mountain Home Air Force Base in Idaho.

== Operators ==
Lithuania

- Lithuanian National Defence Volunteer Forces

== Specifications (Yak-55M) ==
Data from Brassey's World Aircraft & Systems Directory 1999/2000

General characteristics

- Crew: one
- Length: 7.29 m (23 ft 11 in)
- Wingspan: 8.10 m (26 ft 7 in)
- Height: 2.80 m (9 ft 2 in)
- Wing area: 12.8 m^{2} (138 sq ft)
- Aspect ratio: 5.13
- Gross weight: 855 kg (1,885 lb) for aerobatics
- Max takeoff weight: 975 kg (2,150 lb) for ferry flight
- Powerplant: 1 × Vedeneyev M14P 9-cylinder radial engine, 268.5 kW (360.1 hp)

Performance

- Maximum speed: 305 km/h (190 mph, 165 kn)
- Stall speed: 100 km/h (62 mph, 54 kn)
- Never exceed speed: 450 km/h (280 mph, 240 kn)
- Ferry range: 705 km (438 mi, 381 nmi)
- g limits: +9, -6
- Roll rate: 345 degrees per second
- Rate of climb: 15.5 m/s (3,050 ft/min)

== See also ==
Related development

- Yakovlev Yak-50
- Yakovlev Yak-54

Aircraft of comparable role, configuration, and era

- Sukhoi Su-26
- Sukhoi Su-29
- Sukhoi Su-31
