= T-411 =

T-411 may refer to:

- Khrunichev T-411 Aist, a Russian aircraft design
- Washington T-411 Wolverine, an American homebuilt aircraft design
