= Sukhoi Su-26 =

Soviet aerobatic aircraft

Su-26
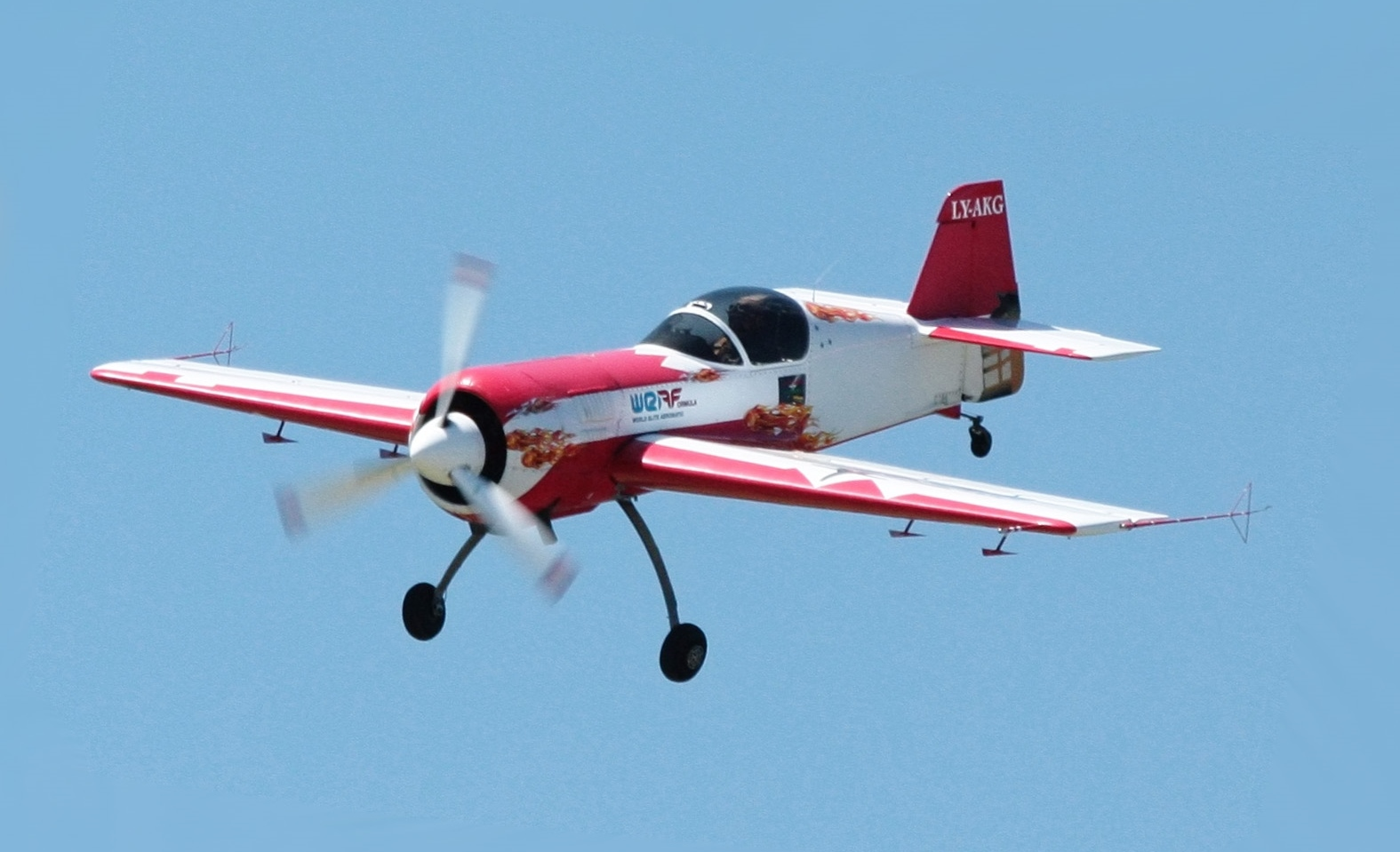
- A Sukhoi Su-26 in flight

General information
- Type: Aerobatic aircraft
- National origin: Soviet Union
- Manufacturer: Sukhoi
- Status: Active

History
- First flight: June 1984
- Developed into: Sukhoi Su-29; Sukhoi Su-31

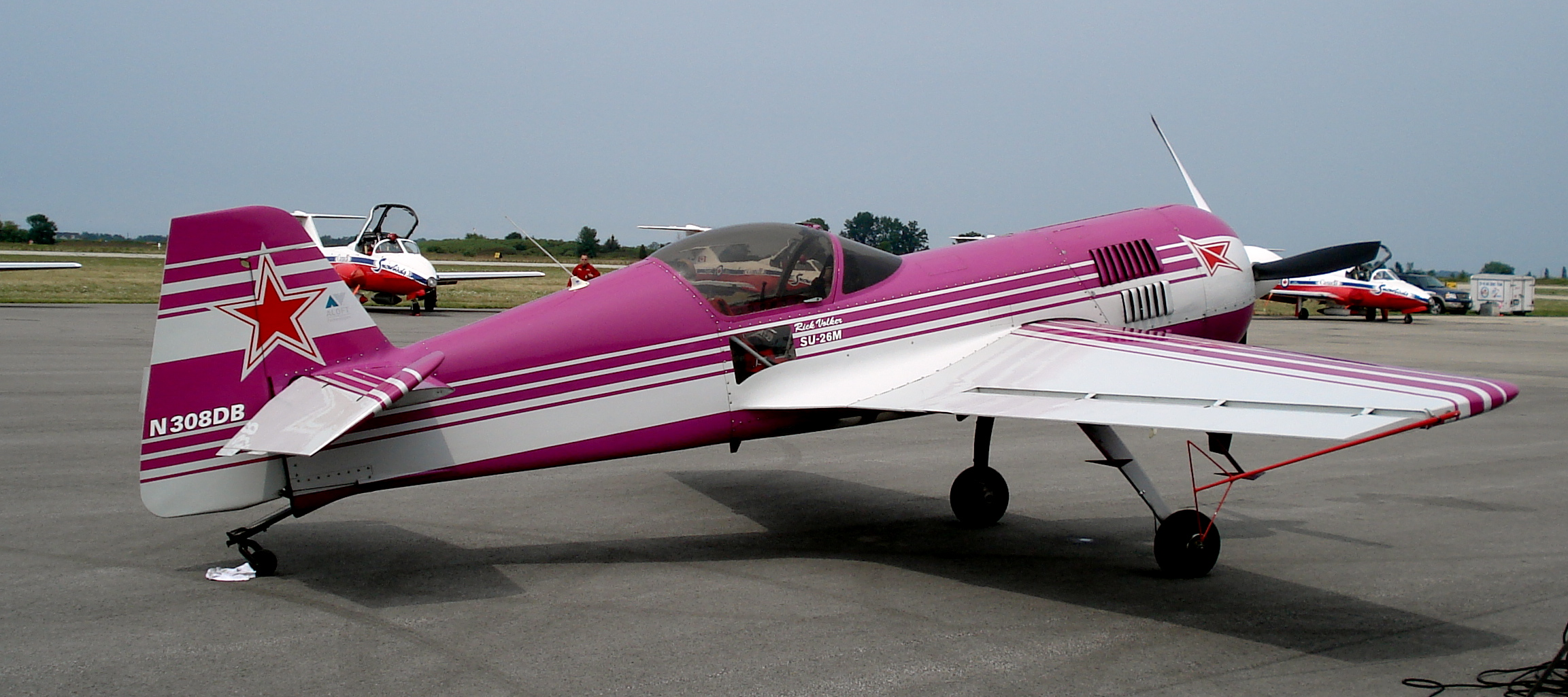
Su-26M at the St Catharines Wings and Wheels

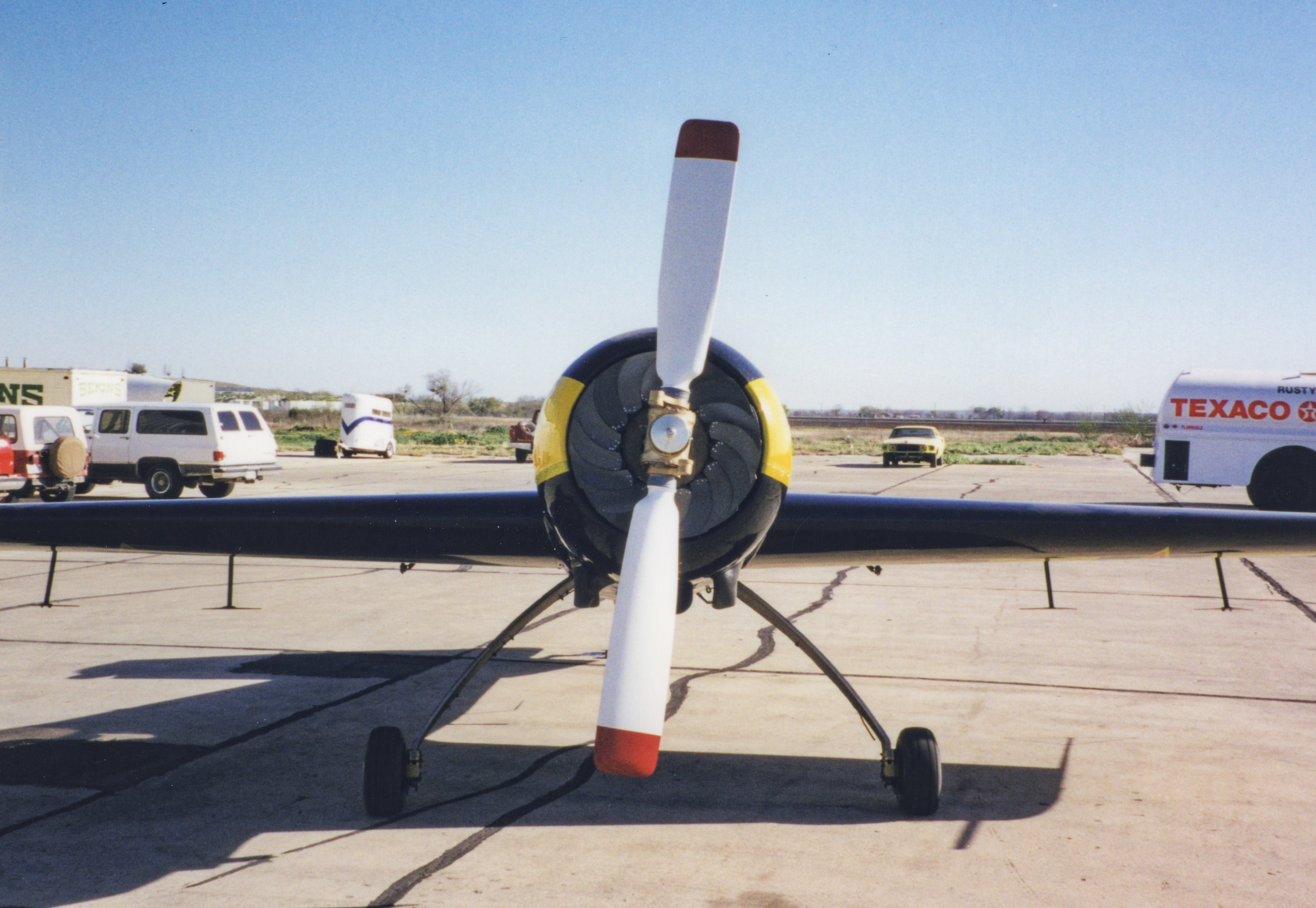
Early-model Sukhoi Su-26 with a two-bladed propeller

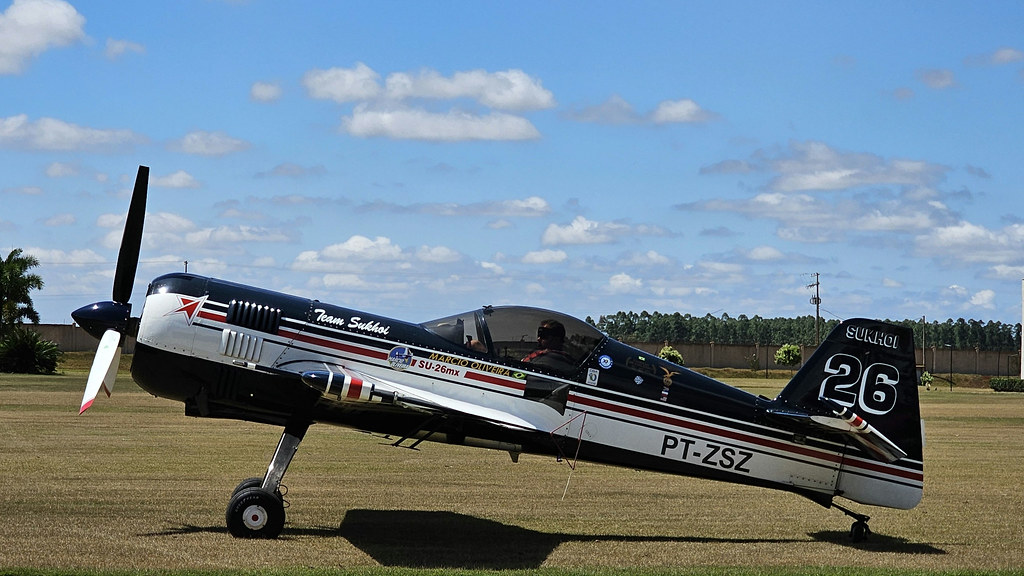
Sukhoi Su-26MX in Brazil

The Sukhoi Su-26 is a single-seater aerobatic aircraft from the former Soviet Union, powered by a single radial reciprocating engine. The Su-26 has mid-mounted straight wings and fixed landing gear, the main gear mounted on a solid titanium arc.

The Su-26 made its first flight in June 1984, the original four having a two-bladed propeller. The production switched to the Su-26M, with refined tail surfaces and a German-made MTV-9 3-blade composite propeller. Further refinements were made, and the model won both the men's and women's team prizes at the 1986 World Aerobatics Championships. The modified Su-26M3 with the new M9F 320 kW (430 hp) engine dominated the 2003 and 2005 Aerobatic World Championships as well as the 2004 European Championships.

The Su-26 has fully metric instruments, except for the altimeter.

== Specifications (Su-26) ==

Data from Su-26, 29, 31 Specifications

General characteristics

- Crew: 1
- Length: 6.827 m (22 ft 5 in)
- Wingspan: 7.8 m (25 ft 7 in)
- Height: 2.89 m (9 ft 6 in)
- Wing area: 11.83 m^{2} (127.3 sq ft)
- Airfoil: root: Symmetrical 18%; tip: Symmetrical 12%
- Empty weight: 700 kg (1,543 lb)
- Gross weight: 790 kg (1,742 lb)
- Max takeoff weight: 962 kg (2,121 lb)
- Powerplant: 1 × Vedeneyev M14P 9-cylinder air-cooled radial piston engine, 270 kW (360 hp)
- Propellers: 3-bladed constant-speed propeller

Performance

- Maximum speed: 450 km/h (280 mph, 240 kn)
- Cruise speed: 295 km/h (183 mph, 159 kn)
- Landing speed: 115 km/h (71 mph; 62 kn)
- Range: 800 km (500 mi, 430 nmi)
- Service ceiling: 4,000 m (13,000 ft)
- g limits: +12 (ultimate)
- Rate of climb: 18 m/s (3,500 ft/min)

== In popular culture ==
IL-2 Sturmovik: Cliffs of Dover is a combat flight simulation video game mainly set in the Battle of Britain in 1940. Nevertheless, when the game was still under development, the Sukhoi Su-26 had been promised as a bonus flyable aircraft for all players, but was not included in the game upon release in March 2011. It was finally included as downloadable content with the adjunction of the Steam patch 1.11.20362 on 19 October 2012.

== See also ==
Related development

- Sukhoi Su-29
- Sukhoi Su-31

Aircraft of comparable role, configuration, and era

- Yakovlev Yak-50
- Yakovlev Yak-52
- Yakovlev Yak-54
- Yakovlev Yak-55
- Extra 300
