= Kimball McCullocoupe =

Kimball McCulloCoupe
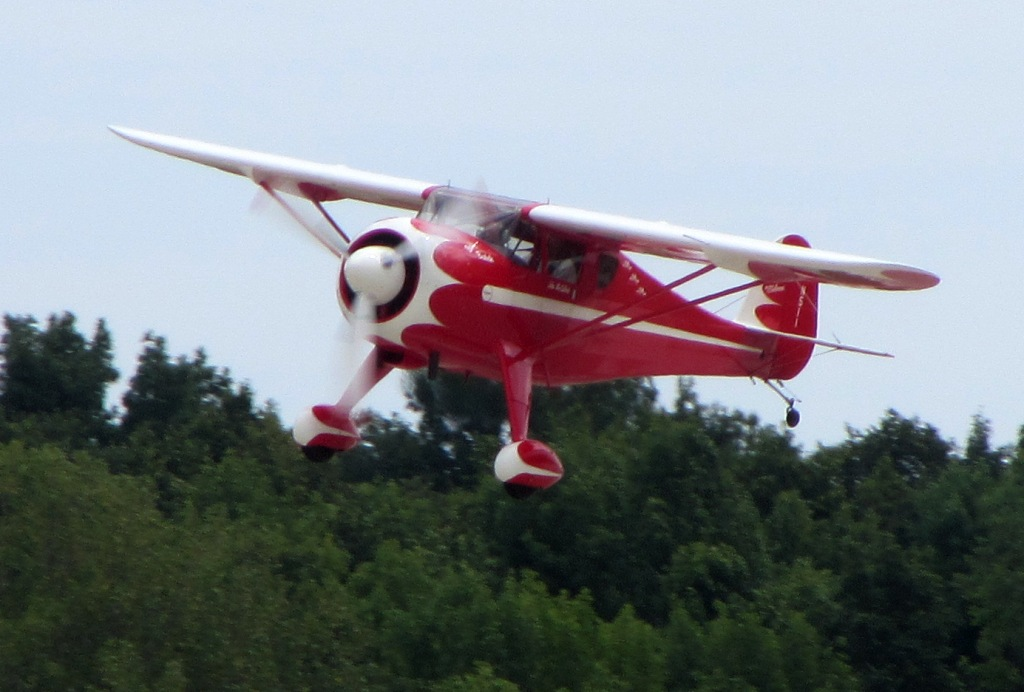
- McCulloCoupe landing

General information
- Type: Homebuilt aircraft
- National origin: United States of America
- Designer: Kevin Kimball
- Number built: 1

History
- First flight: 1 March 2004

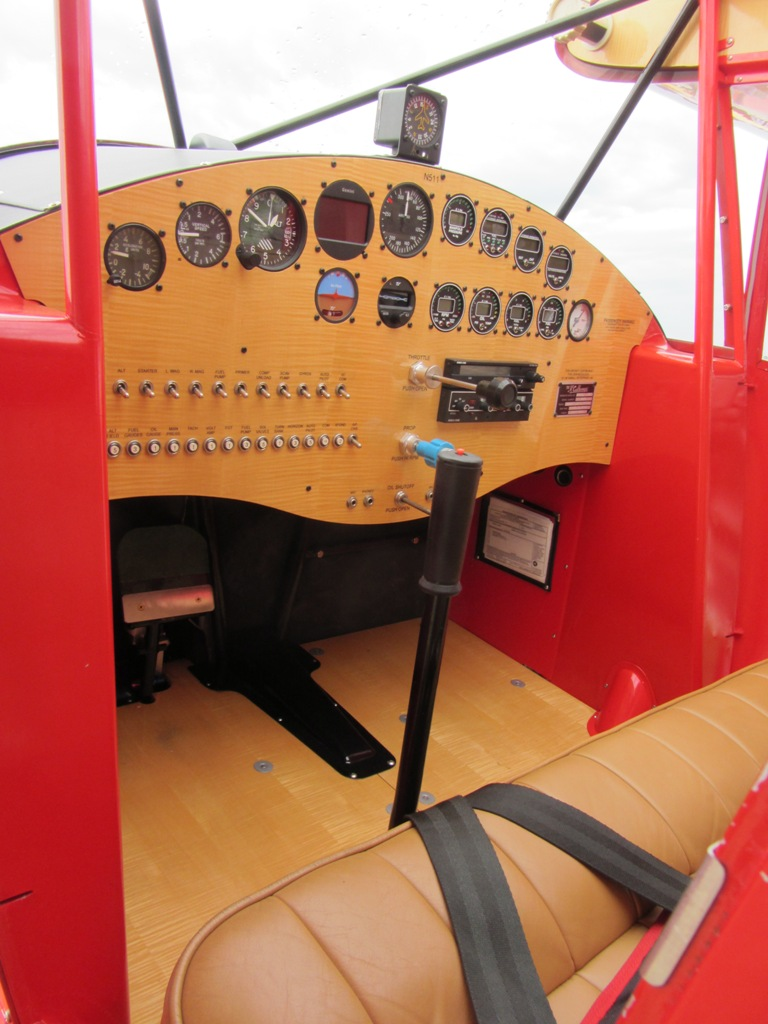
McCullocoupe instrument panel

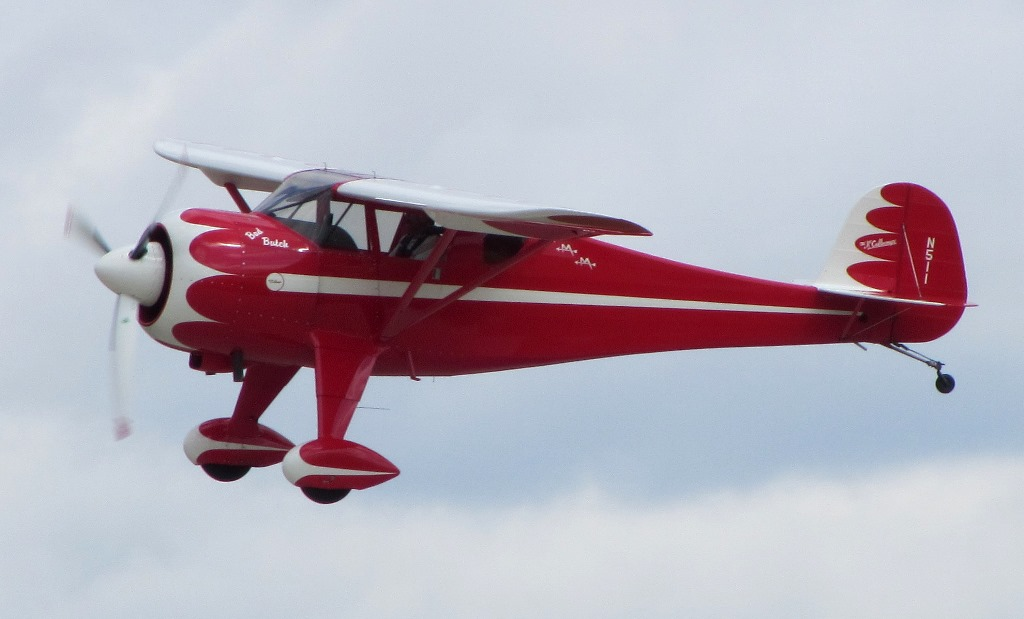
Kimball McCullocoupe

The Kimball McCullocoupe is a homebuilt aircraft built around the design of the Clipwing 110 Special Monocoupe.

== Development ==
The McCulloCoupe is an aircraft built as an evolution of air racers starting with the Velie Monocoupe. The Monocoupe evolved into the Monocoupe 110, eventually flown as an air-racer with clipped wings. Ben Howard built a larger version of the Monocoupe, "Mister Mulligan". The Mullicoupe replicas were developed using Pratt & Whitney R-985 Wasp Junior engines. The McCulloCoupe uses a Vedeneyev M14P radial engine with features developed for the Pitts Model 12. Construction began in 2000, with the first flight in 2004.

== Design ==
The McCulloCoupe has side-by-side configuration seating, a high-wing, conventional landing gear and a radial engine. The wings use plywood covering.

== Specifications (McCulloCoupe) ==
General characteristics

- Crew: 1
- Capacity: 1 passenger
- Wingspan: 26 ft (7.9 m)
- Powerplant: 1 × Vedeneyev M14PF radial engine, 400 hp (300 kW)
- Propellers: 3-bladed MT Propeller

Performance
