= Yakovlev Yak-58 =

Russian utility transport aircraft

General information
- Type: Six-seat cabin monoplane
- National origin: Russia
- Manufacturer: Yakovlev, TAM Management

History
- First flight: 26 December 1993

The Yakovlev Yak-58 is a small, multi-role utility transport and business aircraft. The aircraft features a pusher engine and twin boom tail. It saw limited production in the late 1990s.

== Design and development ==
Following the collapse of the Soviet Union, as military contracts evaporated, the Yakovlev design bureau was forced to convert to designing civilian aircraft to stay in business. Their first post-Soviet design was the Yak-58, a small multi-role utility transport designed to appeal to as many prospective buyers as possible.

The Yak-58 is a low-winged monoplane of pusher configuration, powered by a Vedeneyev M14PT radial engine mounted at the rear of the fuselage nacelle, driving a three-bladed propeller. Rather than conventional tailbooms, the two highly swept fins were mounted directly to the wing, and were joined by the tailplane. The undercarriage is a retractable tricycle arrangement. Seats are fitted for a pilot and five passengers, with the option of replacing the passengers by 450 kg (990 kg) of cargo.

== Testing ==
The first prototype made its maiden flight at Tbilisi, Georgia on 26 December 1993, although some sources state that the first flight did not occur until 17 April 1994. This aircraft was wrecked in a fatal crash at the ILA Berlin Air Show on 27 May 1994, with the second prototype flying on 10 October 1994.

Yakovlev claimed in 1997 that it had orders for 250 Yak-58s, with an ELINT version and a version replacing the radial engine with a turboprop planned. Limited production occurred at Tbilisi, however, due to funding problems and political problems between Georgia and Russia, Yakovlev attempted to restart the project in 2003, possibly with production moved back to Russia.

== Specifications (Yak-58) ==
Data from Brassey's World Aircraft & Systems Directory 1999/2000

General characteristics

- Crew: 1
- Capacity: 5 pax
- Length: 8.55 m (28 ft 1 in)
- Wingspan: 12.7 m (41 ft 8 in)
- Height: 3.16 m (10 ft 4 in)
- Wing area: 20 m^{2} (220 sq ft)
- Empty weight: 1,270 kg (2,800 lb)
- Gross weight: 2,800 kg (6,173 lb)
- Powerplant: 1 × Vedeneyev M14PT 9-cylinder air-cooled radial piston engine, 269 kW (361 hp)
- Propellers: 3-bladed constant-speed pusher propeller

Performance

- Maximum speed: 300 km/h (190 mph, 160 kn)
- Cruise speed: 285 km/h (177 mph, 154 kn)
- Range: 1,000 km (620 mi, 540 nmi)
- Service ceiling: 4,000 m (13,000 ft)

== See also ==
Aircraft of comparable role, configuration, and era

- Adam A500
- Edgley Optica
