= Southern Cross Aerobatic Squadron =

Southern Cross Aerobatic Squadron Escuadrilla Cruz del Sur
- Southern Cross Aerobatic Flight logo
- Active: 1962-1962; 1997-2010
- Disbanded: Disbanded in 2006 when the Sukhoi SU-29AR was retired from service. Two aircraft were pulled back into service a couple years later and continued to perform demonstrations until 2010. An attempt was made to revive the team in 2013 with the new IA-63 Pampa II, but only one aircraft was delivered and painted in the team's livery. Due to budget issues, the team never got back off the ground and the sole IA-63 Pampa II to be painted in the Southern Cross livery has since been repainted in the Argentine Air Force's standard low vis scheme.
- Country: Argentina
- Branch: Argentine Air Force
- Type: Aerobatic display
- Role: Flight demonstration team
- Size: Six pilots
- Garrison/HQ: Morón, Buenos Aires, Argentina
- Colors: Light Blue & White
- Equipment: 1962-1985: North American F-86F Sabre (x6); 1997-2010: 7 Sukhoi SU-29AR (x7); 2013: IA-63 Pampa II (planned x6). Only one aircraft delivered and team was disbanded before any performances took place.

Escuadrilla Acrobática Cruz del Sur ("Southern Cross Aerobatic Squadron") was the aerobatic demonstration team of the Argentine Air Force, established in 1962 as part of the 4th Air Group based in Mendoza. It was dissolved and reformed several times, and has been inactive since 2010.

== History ==
As part of the celebrations of the 50th anniversary of the Argentine Air Force creation, in 1961 it was ordered to different units to create display teams. The Southern Cross aerobatic team was created in early 1962 by the 1st Fighter-bomber Group of the IV Brigada Aérea (Argentina) of the Argentine Air Force, based at Los Tamarindos, Mendoza. It operated six F-86 Sabre aircraft until its disbandment in December of the same year. Sabres would still be used occasionally in aerobatics until 1985, though not using the team's name.

The team was reformed in 1997 with seven Sukhoi Su-29AR, and disbanded again in 2010 due to budget and maintenance problems. It was based at the IV Airborne Brigade located at El Plumerillo Air Base in Mendoza.

In 2012 the Argentine Air Force attempted to re-established the team and intended to base six upgraded IA-63 Pampa II advanced jet trainers at Morón Air Base, in Morón, Buenos Aires Province. In 2013, the first IA-63 (E-820) was delivered and painted in the team's colours. Unfortunately, due to budgetary issues, the team failed to get established and the sole delivered IA-63 was repainted into the standard low vis grey of the rest of the IA-63 fleet.

== Aircraft used ==
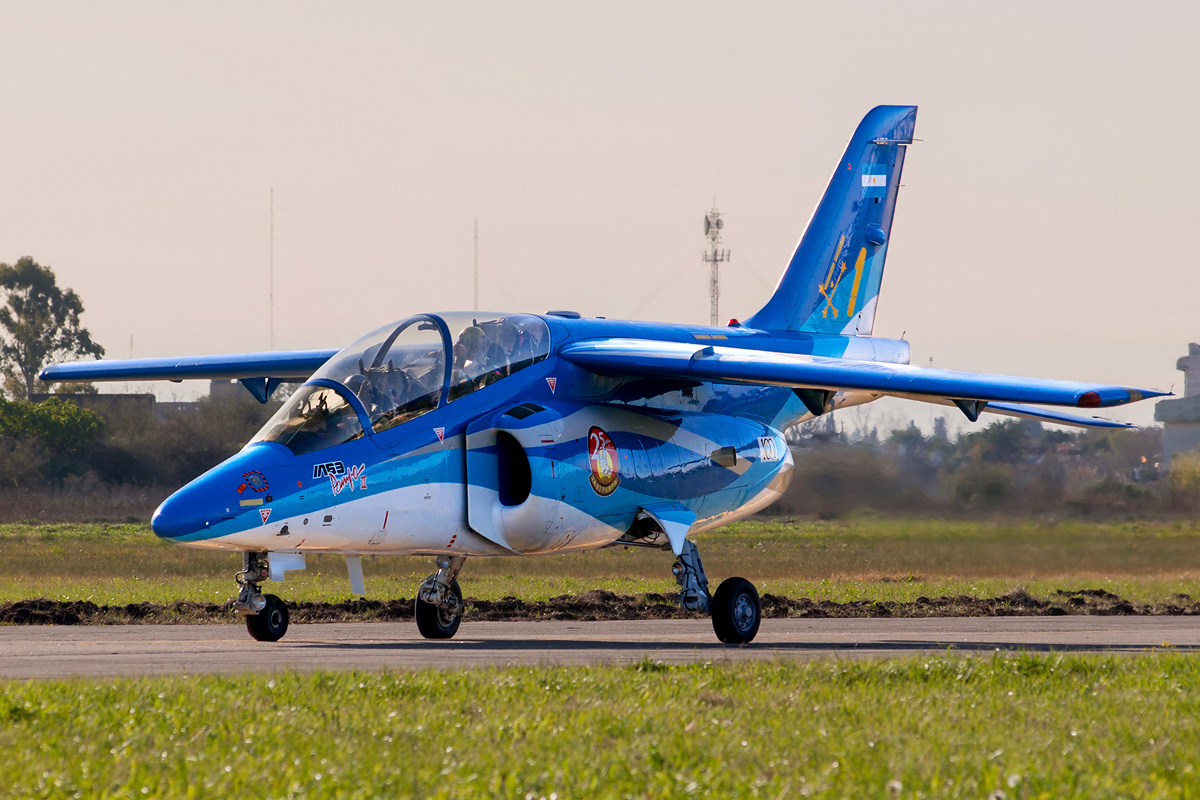
A FMA IA 63 Pampa

Type	Quantity	Period
United States - North American F-86	6	1962—1985
Russia - Sukhoi Su-29	7	1997—2010
Argentina - FMA IA 63 Pampa (planned)	(1)	(2013)
