= Vedeneyev M14P =

Russian radial aircraft engine

M14P
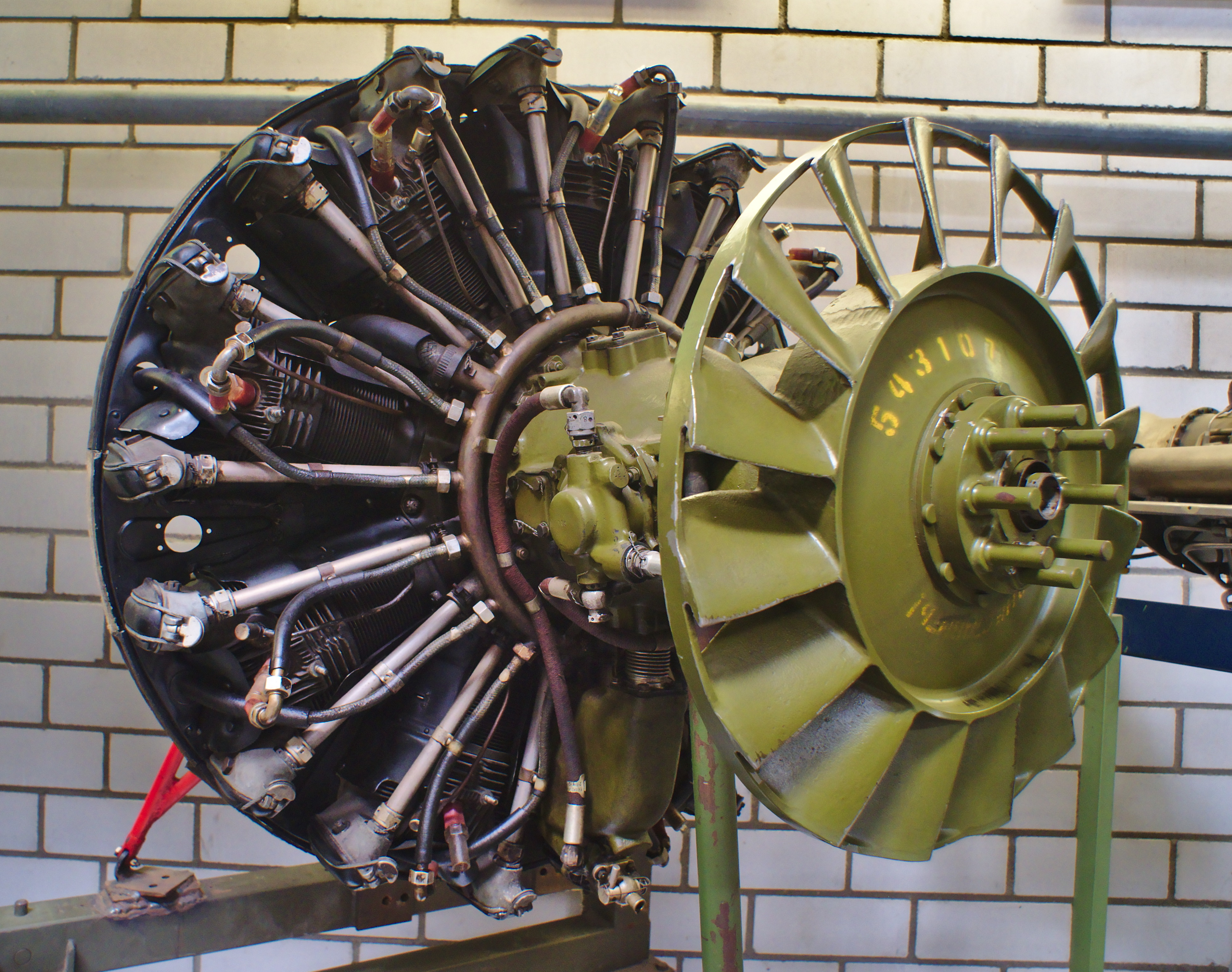
- Vedeneyev M14P on display at the Wehrtechnische Studiensammlung
- Type: Radial aero engine
- Manufacturer: Motorstar, Voronezh Mechanical Plant
- Designer: Ivchenko, VMZ
- Developed from: Ivchenko AI-14

The Vedeneyev M14P is a Russian nine-cylinder, four-stroke, air-cooled, petrol-powered radial engine. Producing 360 hp (268 kW), its design dates from the 1940s (Kotelnikov 2005), and is itself a development of the Ivchenko AI-14 engine. The engine has been used extensively by the Yakovlev and Sukhoi Design Bureaus. The M14P is also used in some experimental aircraft and kit designs such as the Murphy Moose, Radial Rocket, Pitts Model 12, and others.

The M14PF is a 400 hp (298 kW) version of the M14P.

== Design and development ==
The engine's intake system uses a gear driven supercharger and an automatic-mixture type carburetor. Power is transmitted to the propeller via a reduction gearbox.

In addition to the carburetor, the engine has a speed governor, two magnetos, mechanical fuel pump, generator, and an oil pump. It is started pneumatically, and remains fully operational during inverted flight. Unlike most American piston-type aero-engines, which turn to the right (clockwise) when viewed from the cockpit, the M14P rotates to the left (counter-clockwise), like most British-designed radials of the World War II era.

A factory modification to the supercharger gearing results in the engine producing 400 hp, while non-factory modifications have it producing as much as 460 hp. Such non-factory engines may also incorporate other upgrades, such as electric starters and electronic ignition.

When operated in a certified aircraft, the TBO (Time Between Overhauls) for the M14P engine is 750 hours initially, and every 500 hours thereafter. On experimental aircraft, the engines are often run to their complete 2250-hour design life before overhaul.

The M14-V26 variant has been developed exclusively for the Kamov Ka-26, where "V" stands for vertolet (helicopter) and "26" for Ka-26. Power is rated at 239 kW (325 HP) for take-off. The engine has no integral gearbox; instead, the power is transmitted to the main reduction gearbox via an interconnect shaft.

It currently seems to be manufactured only at Voronezh Mechanical Plant.

"Vedeneyev's first engine was the AI-14RF, which produced 300 hp and this in turn led to the M14P, which was introduced in its Series I form in the early 1970s. This produced 360 hp, and Series II came out in the early 1980s, still delivering 360 hp, but with a variety of small internal improvements."

Production of the engine ended in 1989 or by 1994.

The Laros design bureau, building the Laros-31 aerobatic sports airplane, plans to transfer the assembly of the M14 from Romania to Russia.

== Applications ==
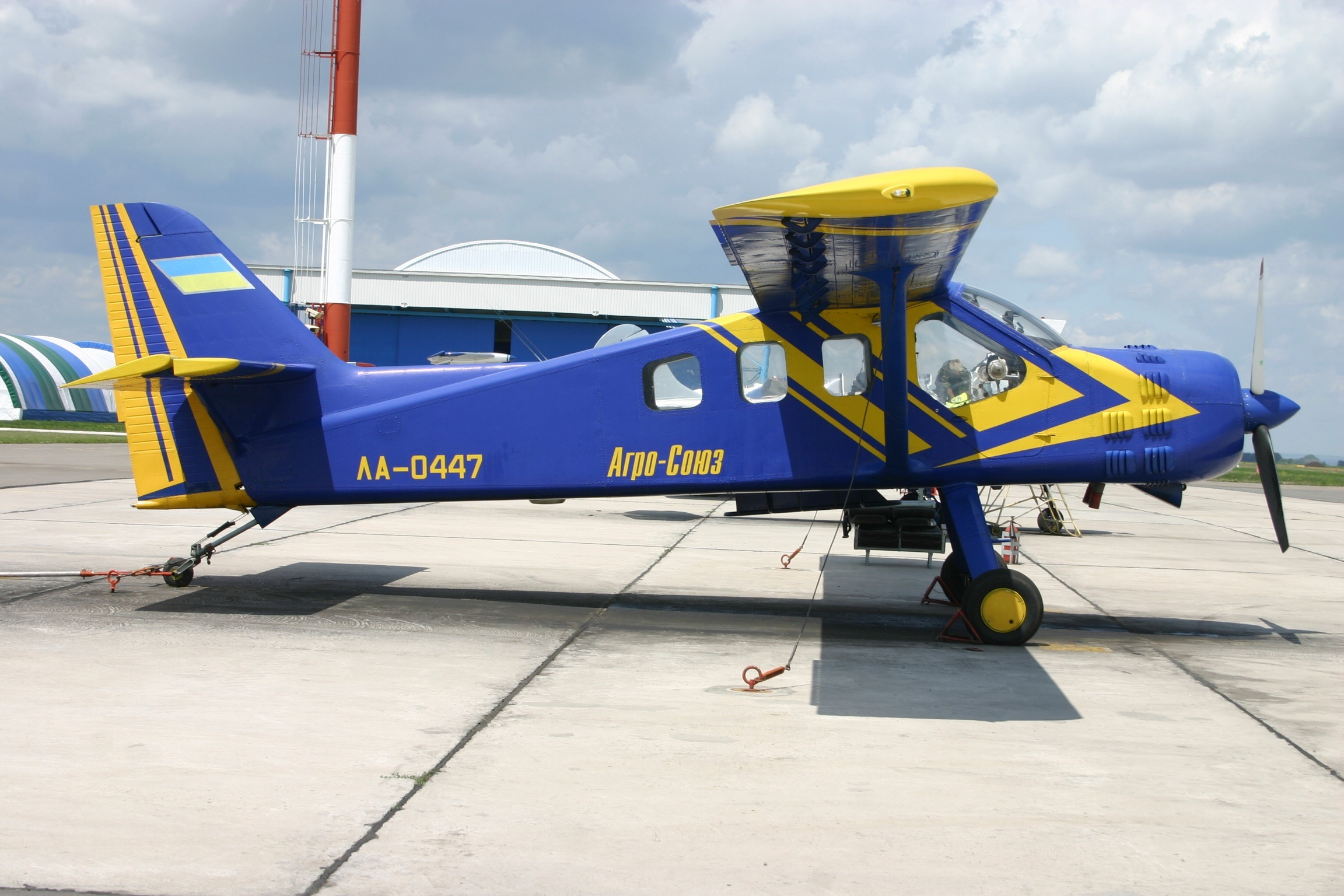
Basic SM-92 with 270 kW (360 hp) Vedeneyev M14P radial engine.

- Altitude Radial Rocket
- Bear 360
- Culp Special (Steen Skybolt variant)
- Kamov Ka-26
- Kensgaila VK-8 Aušra
- Kimball McCullocoupe
- Khrunichev T-411 Aist
- Murphy Moose
- Nanchang CJ-6 (Civilian variant)
- Pitts Model 12
- PZL 104 Wilga 35/P (WilgaBeast — Experimental Modified)
- PZL-105 Flaming
- Slepcev Storch
- Stol Tractor UT-23
- Sukhoi Sa-20P
- Sukhoi Su-26
- Sukhoi Su-29
- Sukhoi Su-31
- Technoavia SM92 Finist
- Technoavia SP-95
- Washington T-411 Wolverine
- Yakovlev Yak-18T
- Yakovlev Yak-50 (trainer)
- Yakovlev Yak-52
- Yakovlev Yak-54
- Yakovlev Yak-55
- Yakovlev Yak-58

== Specifications (M14P) ==
Data from Motorstar

=== General characteristics ===
- Type: Nine cylinder, four-stroke, air-cooled radial engine
- Bore: 105 mm (4.13 in.)
- Stroke: 130 mm (5.11 in.)
- Displacement: 10.16 L (620 cubic inches )
- Length: 924 mm (36.4 in)
- Diameter: 985 mm (38.7 in)
- Dry weight: 214 kg (472 lb)

=== Components ===
- Supercharger: Centrifugal, single-stage, single-speed
- Fuel system: Floatless carburettor
- Fuel type: Minimum 91 octane Avgas
- Oil system: Gear type pump
- Cooling system: Air-cooled
- Reduction gear: 0.658:1, left-hand tractor

=== Performance ===
- Power output: 360 hp (268 kW) at 2,900 rpm
- Compression ratio: 6.3:1

== See also ==
Related development

- Ivchenko AI-14

Related lists

- List of aircraft engines
