= Yakovlev Yak-50 (1975) =

Soviet aerobatic plane

Yak-50
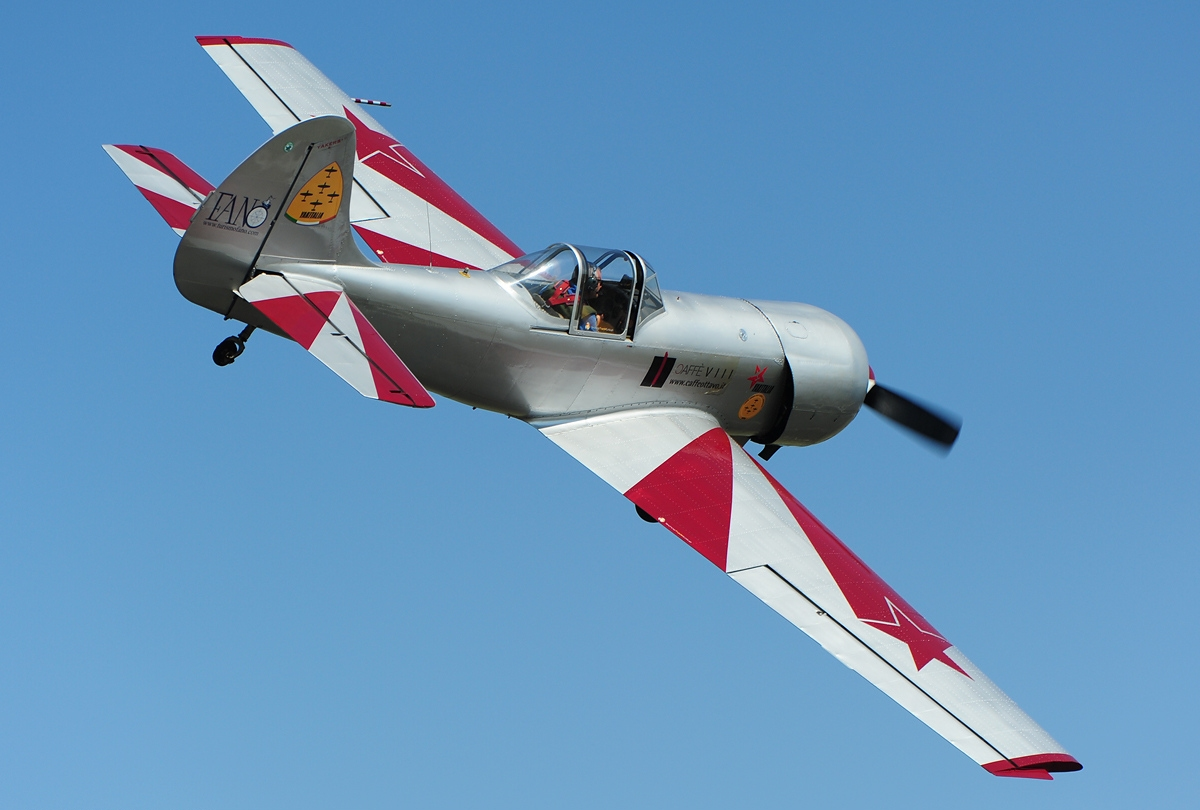

General information
- Type: Trainer/aerobatic aircraft
- Manufacturer: Yakovlev
- Number built: 314

History
- Manufactured: 1975-1986
- First flight: 25 June 1975
- Developed from: Yakovlev Yak-18
- Developed into: Yakovlev Yak-52

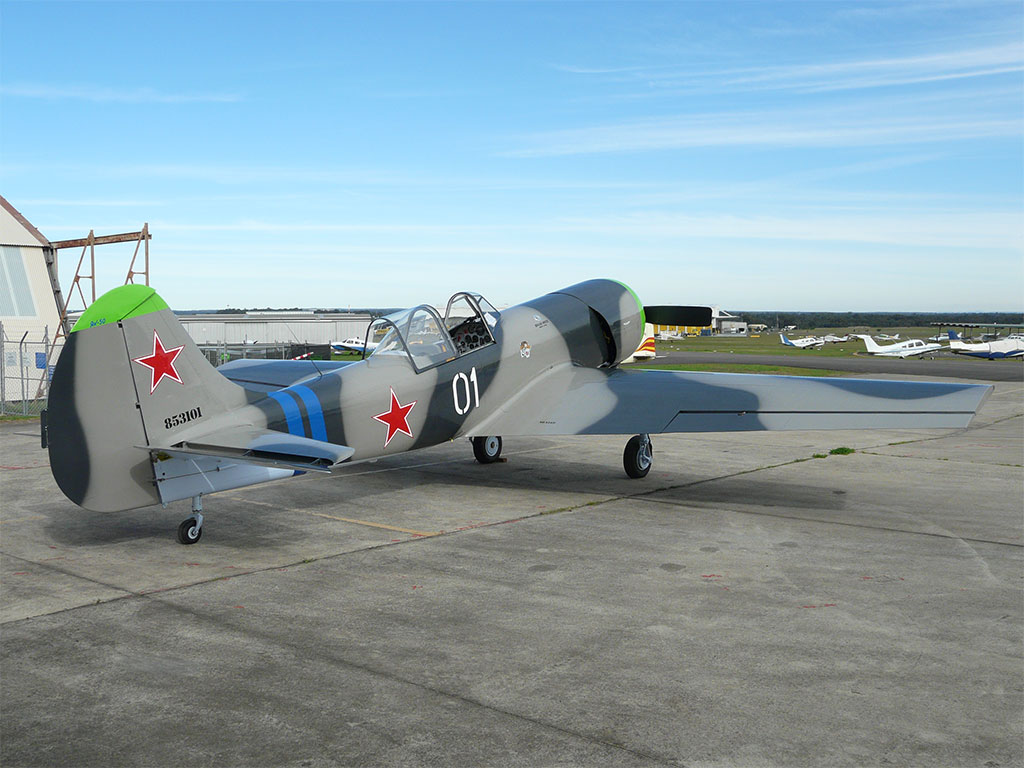
One of the survivors

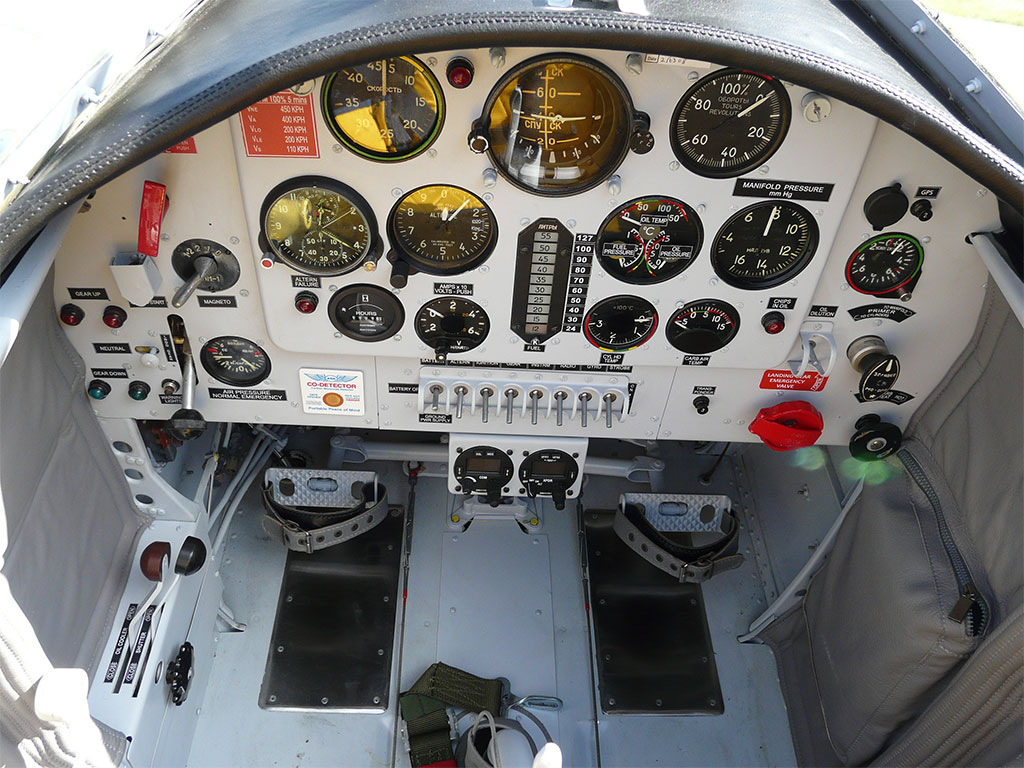
VH-DZY's cockpit

The Yakovlev Yak-50 (Russian: Яковлев Як-50) aerobatic aircraft is a single-seat all-metal low-wing monoplane with retractable main wheels and exposed tail wheel. The control surfaces are fabric-covered to save weight. The aircraft is not equipped with flaps.

The supercharged engine may be the Vedeneyev M14P (standard production line version), M14PF or M14R, producing between 360 and 450 hp and driving the propeller via a reduction gearbox. The landing gear, brakes and engine starter are operated by compressed air. Replenished by an engine-driven compressor, the main and emergency air bottles are contained within the forward fuselage between the firewall and fuel tanks.

The Yak-50 has fine handling characteristics enhanced by a relatively high power-to-weight ratio. It has a tough and agile airframe - the type was twice World Aerobatic Champion. It has been used as a military trainer by several countries.

Aircraft serving with the Soviet National Aerobatic team were typically scrapped after about 50 flight hours, due to the intense stresses imposed on the airframe during unlimited aerobatics. There were numerous cases of main spar failure; among its victims were the 1976 World Aerobatic Champion Viktor Letsko and many others.

Two modifications (Service Bulletin 61DA for S/N 0102-2007 and Service Bulletin 79 for S/N 1201-2806) were made to strengthen the wings spars for the extreme loads experienced during unlimited aerobatics, and no further failures occurred.

Other aircraft serving with DOSAAF were "officially" scrapped or placed into storage after they were superseded by the Yak-55 and Su-26.

It is these aircraft that form the bulk of airworthy "survivors" today. Only a few (approx. 90+) are airworthy and remain in private hands in Europe, the USA, Australia and Canada.

== Civilian operators ==
Italy

- Yakitalia is an Italian civil aerobatic team founded in 1999. It operates three Yak-52s and one Yak-50. The team’s operational base is at Fano “Enzo e Walter Omiccioli” Airport (LIDF) in the Marche region.

== Military operators ==
Lithuania

- Lithuanian National Defence Volunteer Forces

Russia

- DOSAAF Russia

Ukraine

- Civil Air Patrol (Ukraine)

Soviet Union

- DOSAAF

== Specifications ==
Data from Jane's All the World's Aircraft 1982–83

General characteristics

- Crew: 1
- Length: 7.68 m (25 ft 2 in)
- Wingspan: 9.50 m (31 ft 2 in)
- Height: 3.16 m (10 ft 4 in)
- Wing area: 15.00 m^{2} (161.5 sq ft)
- Airfoil: root: Clark YH (14.5%); tip: Clark YH (9.3%)
- Empty weight: 765 kg (1,687 lb)
- Gross weight: 900 kg (1,984 lb)
- Max takeoff weight: 900 kg (1,984 lb)
- Powerplant: 1 × Vedeneyev M-14P 9-cylinder air-cooled radial piston engine, 268 kW (359 hp)
- Propellers: 2-bladed V-530TA-D35 variable pitch propeller, 2.40 m (7 ft 10 in) diameter

Performance

- Maximum speed: 320 km/h (200 mph, 170 kn)(V_{NO})
- Never exceed speed: 420 km/h (260 mph, 230 kn)
- Range: 495 km (308 mi, 267 nmi)
- Service ceiling: 5,500 m (18,000 ft)
- g limits: +9 -6
- Rate of climb: 16.0 m/s (3,150 ft/min)
