= Altitude Radial Rocket =

American homebuilt aircraft

Radial Rocket
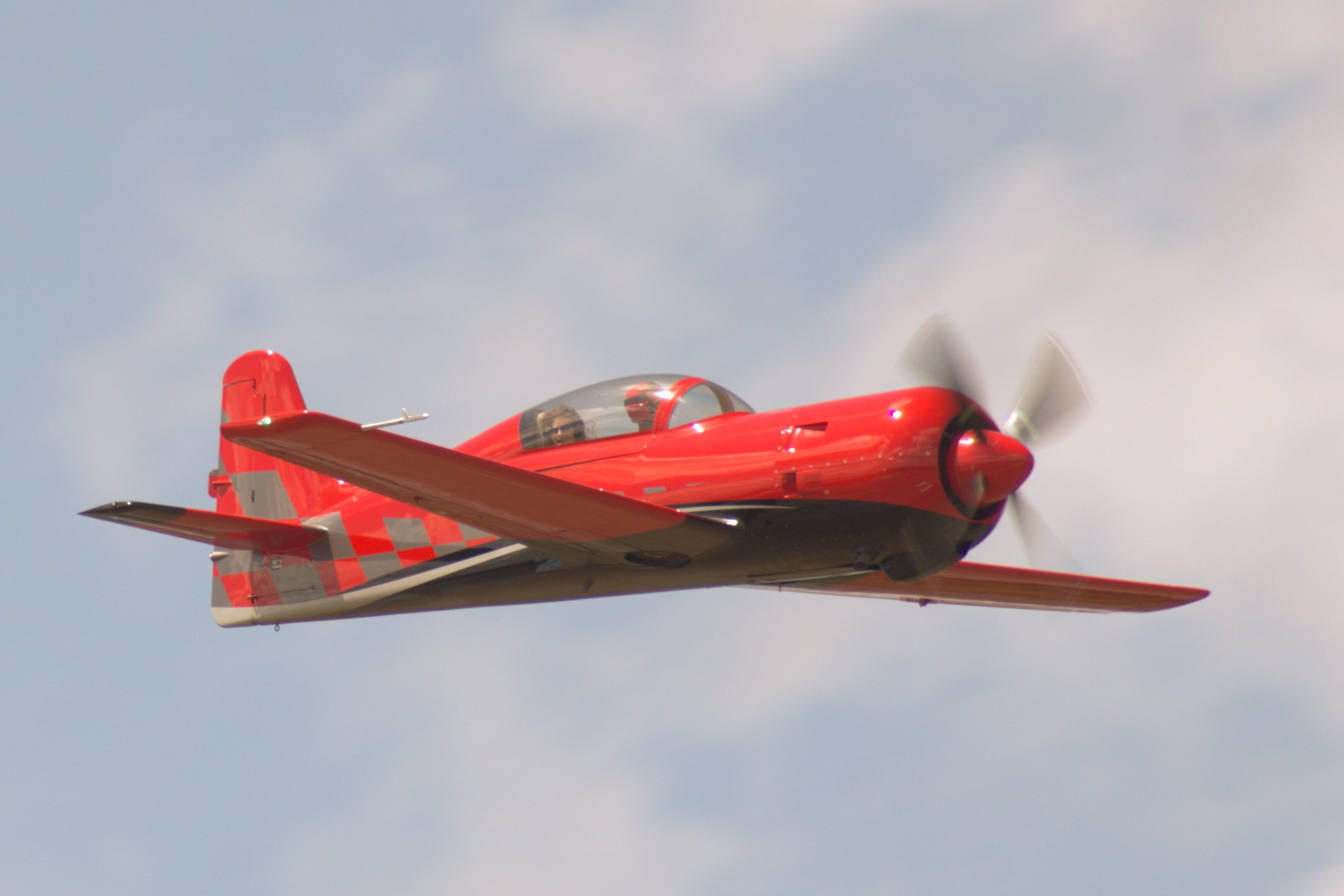
- Altitude Radial Rocket RG in flight

General information
- Type: Amateur-built aircraft
- National origin: United States
- Manufacturer: Altitude Group
- Designer: Jeff Ackland
- Status: In production (2011)
- Number built: 8+

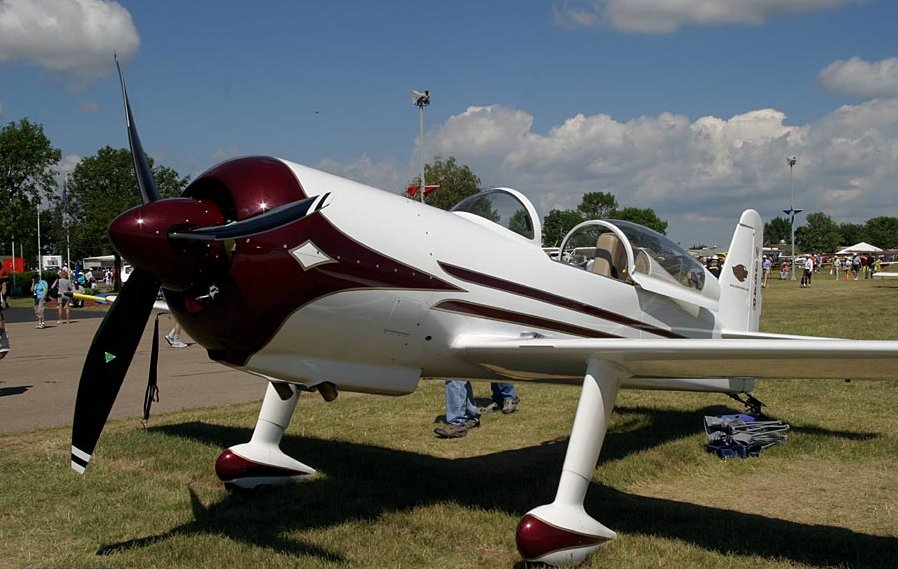
Altitude Radial Rocket TD

The Altitude Radial Rocket is an American amateur-built aircraft, produced by the Altitude Group of Overland Park, Kansas. The aircraft is supplied as a kit for amateur construction.

== Design and development ==
The aircraft features a cantilever low-wing, a two-seats-in-tandem enclosed cockpit under a bubble canopy, fixed conventional landing gear or retractable tricycle landing gear and a single radial engine in tractor configuration.

The aircraft is made from composites. The wing span and area as well as gross weight varies depending on the model. The Radial Rocket's recommended engine power range is 360 to 400 hp (268 to 298 kW) and the standard engine used is the 360 hp (268 kW) Vedeneyev M-14P four-stroke powerplant.

== Operational history ==
As of 2026, seven examples had been registered in the United States with the Federal Aviation Administration. One Radial Rocket TD was completed in South Africa in April 2019.

== Variants ==
Radial Rocket RG
Retractable tricycle gear model. It has a 26.8 ft (8.2 m) span wing, a wing area of 93.9 sq ft (8.72 m^{2}) and a gross weight of 2,575 lb (1,168 kg). Construction time from the supplied kit is 2000 hours. Two were reported flying by the end of 2011.
Radial Rocket TD
Fixed taildragger gear model. It has a 25.5 ft (7.8 m) span wing, a wing area of 90.8 sq ft (8.44 m^{2}) and a gross weight of 2,550 lb (1,160 kg). Construction time from the supplied kit is 1900 hours. Four were reported flying by the end of 2011.

== Specifications (Radial Rocket RG) ==
Data from Kitplanes

General characteristics

- Crew: one
- Capacity: one passenger
- Length: 22.2 ft (6.8 m)
- Wingspan: 26.8 ft (8.2 m)
- Wing area: 93.9 sq ft (8.72 m^{2})
- Empty weight: 1,720 lb (780 kg)
- Gross weight: 2,575 lb (1,168 kg)
- Fuel capacity: 65 U.S. gallons (250 L; 54 imp gal)
- Powerplant: 1 × Vedeneyev M-14P nine cylinder, air-cooled, four stroke radial engine, 360 hp (270 kW)
- Propellers: 4-bladed constant speed propeller

Performance

- Cruise speed: 242 mph (389 km/h, 210 kn)
- Stall speed: 70 mph (110 km/h, 61 kn)
- Range: 1,200 mi (1,900 km, 1,000 nmi)
- Rate of climb: 3,500 ft/min (18 m/s)
- Wing loading: 27.4 lb/sq ft (134 kg/m^{2})
