= Kensgaila VK-8 Aušra =

VK-8 Aušra

General information
- Type: Single-seat agricultural monoplane
- National origin: Lithuania
- Manufacturer: Kensgaila Aircraft Enterprize
- Designer: Vladas Kensgaila

History
- First flight: 1989

The Kensgaila VK-8 Aušra is a 1980s Lithuanian single-seat agricultural monoplane designed by Vladas Kensgaila and built by Kensgaila Aircraft Enterprize.

== Design and development ==
The VK-8 Ausra is a metal and composite monoplane with a fixed landing gear with a tailwheel. The Ausra has side-by-side seating for two and is powered by a 360 hp (268 kW) Vedeneyev M14P radial piston engine.

== Specifications ==
Data from

General characteristics

- Crew: 2
- Length: 10.00 m (32 ft 10 in)
- Wingspan: 14.83 m (48 ft 8 in)
- Empty weight: 1,140 kg (2,513 lb)
- Gross weight: 2,200 kg (4,850 lb)
- Powerplant: 1 × Vedeneyev M14P radial piston engine, 270 kW (360 hp)

Performance

- Maximum speed: 220 km/h (140 mph, 120 kn)
- Cruise speed: 180 km/h (110 mph, 97 kn)
- Stall speed: 71 km/h (44 mph, 38 kn)
- Range: 480 km (300 mi, 260 nmi)
- Rate of climb: 5.00 m/s (985 ft/min)
