= Culp Special =

American homebuilt aircraft

Special
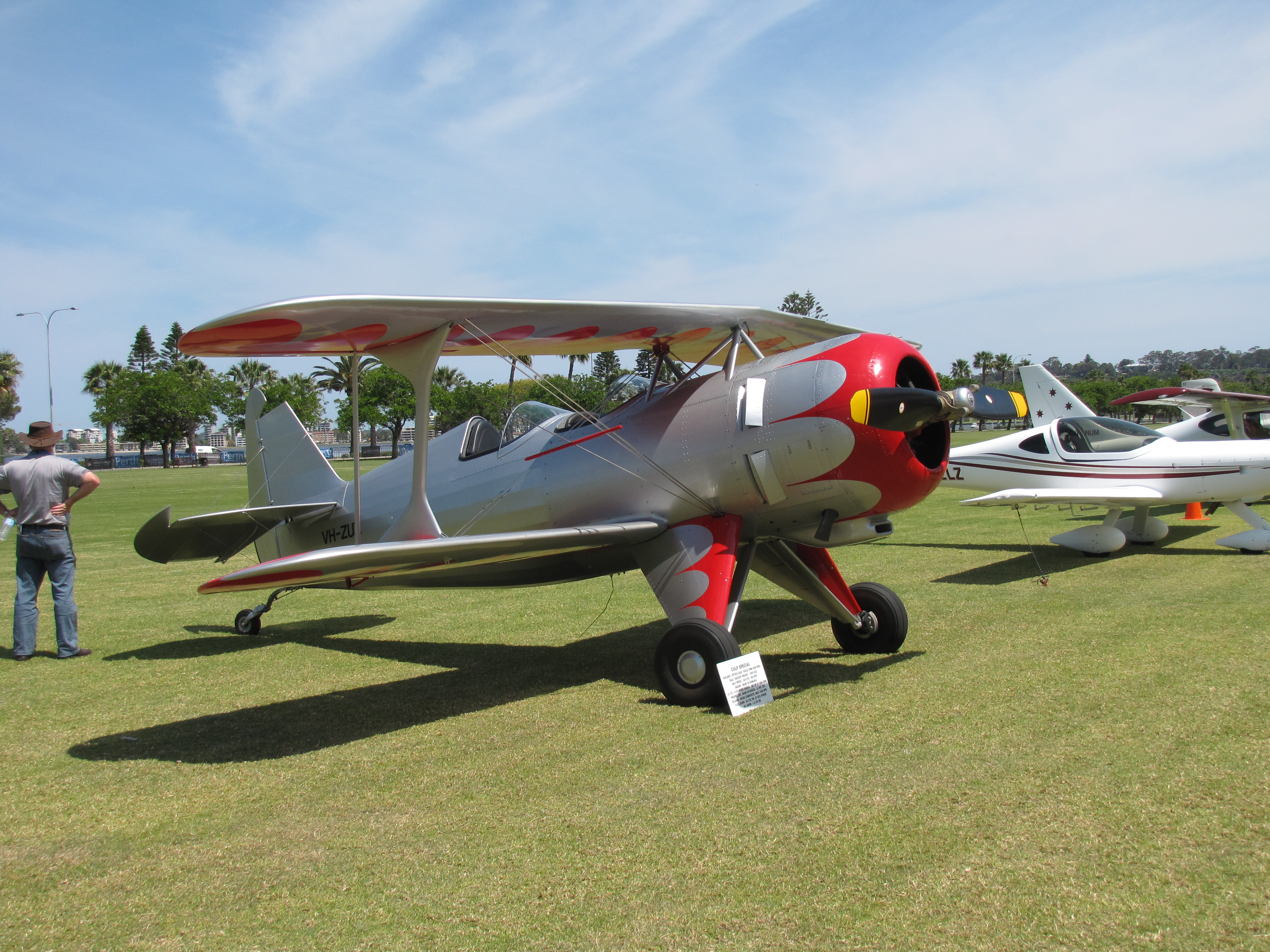

General information
- Type: Homebuilt aircraft
- National origin: United States
- Manufacturer: Culp's Specialties
- Status: In production (2013)
- Number built: at least six

The Culp Special is an American aerobatic homebuilt aircraft designed and produced by Culp's Specialties of Shreveport, Louisiana. The aircraft is supplied as a kit or in the form of plans for amateur construction.

== Design and development ==
The Culp Special is intended to resemble an aircraft of the 1930s. It features a wire and strut-braced biplane layout, a two-seats-in-tandem open cockpit with dual windshields, fixed conventional landing gear with wheel pants, and a single engine in tractor configuration.

The aircraft is made from welded steel tubing and wood, all covered in doped aircraft fabric. Its 24.00 ft (7.3 m) span wing has a wing area of 161 sq ft (15.0 m^{2}). The standard engine used is the Russian 360 hp (268 kW) Vedeneyev M14P nine cylinder, air-cooled, four stroke radial engine.

The Culp Special has a typical empty weight of 1,480 lb (670 kg) and a gross weight of 2,100 lb (950 kg), giving a useful load of 620 lb (280 kg). With full fuel of 70 U.S. gallons (260 L; 58 imp gal) the payload for pilot, passengers, and baggage is 200 lb (91 kg).

The manufacturer estimates the construction time from the supplied kit as 2500 hours.

== Operational history ==
By 1998 the company reported that one aircraft was flying.

In December 2016, three examples were registered in the United States with the Federal Aviation Administration and one in Canada with Transport Canada.

== Specifications (Culp Special) ==
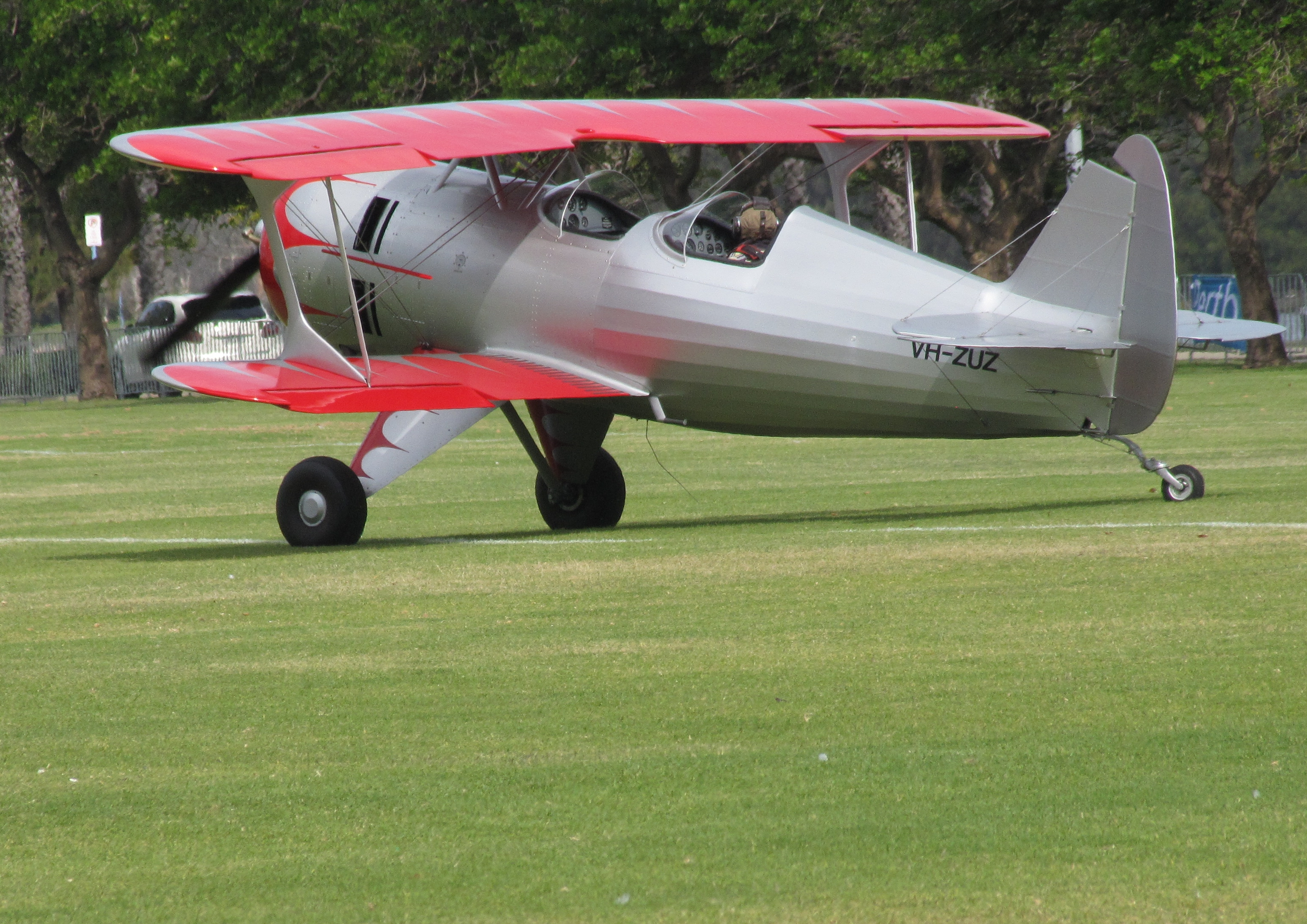
Culp Special

Data from AeroCrafter and Culp's Specialties

General characteristics

- Crew: one
- Capacity: one passenger
- Length: 21 ft 0 in (6.40 m)
- Wingspan: 24 ft 0 in (7.32 m)
- Wing area: 161 sq ft (15.0 m^{2})
- Empty weight: 1,480 lb (671 kg)
- Gross weight: 2,100 lb (953 kg)
- Fuel capacity: 70 U.S. gallons (260 L; 58 imp gal)
- Powerplant: 1 × Vedeneyev M14P nine cylinder, air-cooled, four stroke radial engine, 360 hp (270 kW)
- Propellers: 2-bladed constant speed propeller

Performance

- Maximum speed: 220 mph (350 km/h, 190 kn)
- Cruise speed: 150 mph (240 km/h, 130 kn)
- Stall speed: 70 mph (110 km/h, 61 kn)
- Range: 600 mi (970 km, 520 nmi)
- Service ceiling: 12,000 ft (3,700 m)
- Rate of climb: 3,500 ft/min (18 m/s)
- Wing loading: 13.0 lb/sq ft (63 kg/m^{2})

== See also ==
- List of aerobatic aircraft
