= Sukhoi Su-29 =

Aerobatic and sport aircraft built in Russia

Su-29
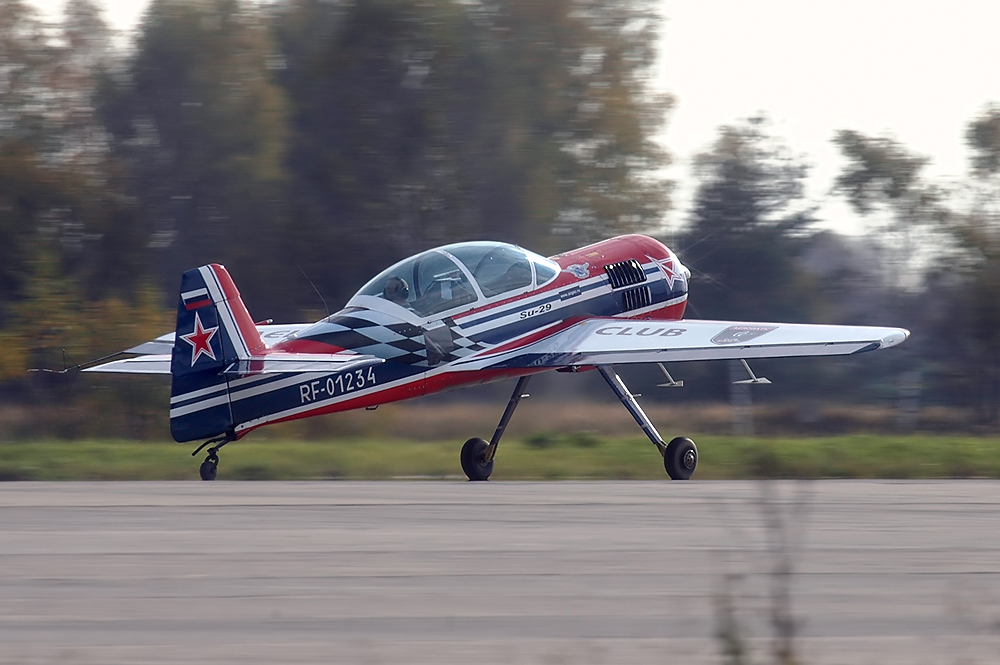
- A Su-29 at Kubinka Air Base

General information
- Type: Aerobatic aircraft Military trainer
- National origin: Russia
- Manufacturer: Sukhoi
- Status: Active

History
- First flight: 1991
- Developed from: Sukhoi Su-26
- Developed into: Sukhoi Su-31

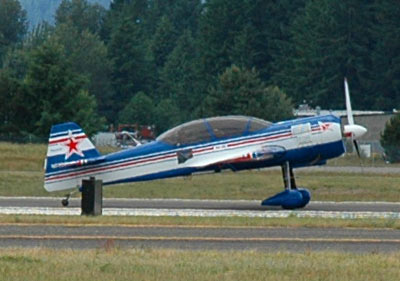

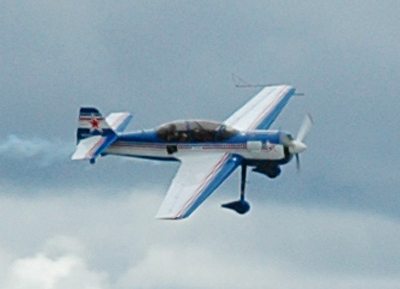

The Sukhoi Su-29 is a Russian two-seat aerobatic aircraft with a 268 kW (360 hp) radial engine. It was designed based on the Su-26 and inherited most of the design and technical features of its predecessor. Due to wide use of composite materials, which make up as much as 60% of the Su-29's aircraft structure, the empty weight is increased by only 50 kg (110 lb) over the single-seat Su-26's empty weight.

The Su-29 is used for initial pilot aerobatics education, flight training, and participation of pilots in aerobatics competitions and air shows, as well as for maintaining flight skills of military and civil pilots.

== Operators ==
Argentina

- Argentine Air Force ordered eight Su-29ARs to equip the Cruz del Sur (Southern Cross) aerobatic team.

Austria

- Flying Bulls

Canada

- International Test Pilots School

Czechia

- Czech aerobatic team

Russia

- DOSAAF

== Specifications (Su-29) ==
Data from Jane's All The World's Aircraft 1993–94, Sukhoi

General characteristics

- Crew: 2
- Length: 7.29 m (23 ft 11 in)
- Wingspan: 8.2 m (26 ft 11 in)
- Height: 2.87 m (9 ft 5 in)
- Wing area: 12.24 m^{2} (131.8 sq ft)
- Airfoil: root: Symmetrical 18%; tip: Symmetrical 12%
- Empty weight: 760 kg (1,676 lb)
- Max takeoff weight: 1,220 kg (2,690 lb)
- Fuel capacity: 268 l (71 gal)
- Powerplant: 1 × Vedeneyev M14P 9-cylinder air-cooled radial piston engine, 265 kW (355 hp)
- Propellers: 3-bladed, 2.4 m (7 ft 10 in) diameter

Performance

- Maximum speed: 440 km/h (270 mph, 240 kn)
- Cruise speed: 250 km/h (160 mph, 130 kn)
- Stall speed: 110 km/h (68 mph, 59 kn)
- Ferry range: 1,245 km (774 mi, 672 nmi)
- Service ceiling: 3,000 m (9,800 ft) or 3,600 m (11,811 ft) for no more than 30 minutes
- g limits: +11/-9 G
- Roll rate: >360°/s
- Rate of climb: 18 m/s (3,500 ft/min)

== See also ==
Related development

- Sukhoi Su-26
- Sukhoi Su-31

Aircraft of comparable role, configuration, and era

- Extra EA-300
