= Yakovlev Yak-54 =

Soviet aerobatic aircraft

Yak-54
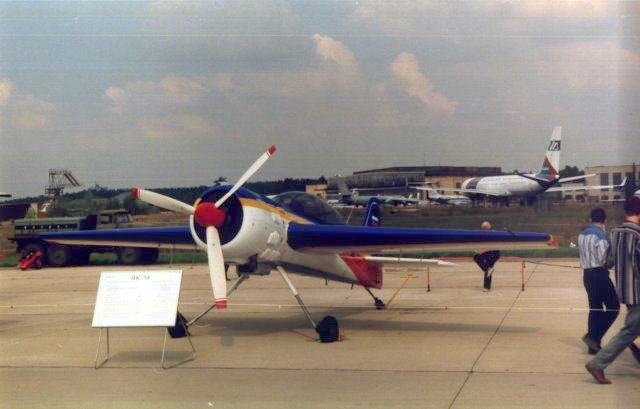

General information
- Type: Two-seat aerobatic monoplane
- National origin: Russia
- Manufacturer: Yakolev Aircraft Corporation / Arsenyev Aviation Company

History
- First flight: 24 December 1993
- Developed from: Yakovlev Yak-55

The Yakovlev Yak-54 is a 1990s Russian aerobatic and sports competition aircraft designed by the Yakovlev Aircraft Corporation.

== Design and development ==
Part of a new generation of acrobatic aircraft from the Yakovlev design bureau which has a long line of aircraft designs since 1937 with the UT-2/AIR-10, the Yak-54 is a development of the single-seat Yak-55M, designed by Chief Constructor Dmitry Drach and Lead Engineer Vladimir Popov. It first flew 23 December 1993.

It was produced by Saratov Aviation Facility in cooperation with JSV "Gorky U-2" up to 2005, when the production moved to the Arsenyev Aviation Company "Progress" facility in Arsenyev.

== Specifications (Yak-54) ==

Data from Brassey's World Aircraft & Systems Directory 1996

General characteristics

- Crew: one
- Capacity: one passenger (not carried for competitions)
- Length: 6.91 m (22 ft 8 in)
- Wingspan: 8.15 m (26 ft 9 in)
- Wing area: 12.890 m^{2} (138.75 sq ft)
- Max takeoff weight: 990 kg (2,183 lb) two-seat (850 kg (1874 lb) for single seat operation)
- Powerplant: 1 × AOOT M-14P 9-cylinder air-cooled radial piston engine, 270 kW (360 hp)
- Propellers: 3-bladed constant-speed variable-pitch

Performance

- Maximum speed: 450 km/h (280 mph, 243 kn)
- Stall speed: 110 km/h (69 mph, 60 kn)
- Ferry range: 700 km (435 mi, 378 nmi)
- Service ceiling: 4,000 m (13,125 ft)
- g limits: +9, -7
- Roll rate: 345 degrees per second
- Rate of climb: 15.01 m/s (2,955 ft/min)

== See also ==
Related development

- Yakovlev Yak-55
