= Washington T-411 Wolverine =

American homebuilt aircraft design

T-411 Wolverine

General information
- Type: Homebuilt aircraft
- National origin: United States
- Manufacturer: Washington Aeroprogress
- Status: Production completed
- Number built: At least ten

History
- Developed from: Khrunichev T-411 Aist

The Washington T-411 Wolverine is an American homebuilt aircraft that was produced by Washington Aeroprogress of Seattle, Washington, introduced in the 1990s. When it was available the aircraft was supplied as a kit or in the form of plans for amateur construction.

== Design and development ==
Developed from the Russian Khrunichev T-411 Aist, the T-411 Wolverine features a strut-braced high-wing, a five-seat enclosed cabin with doors, fixed conventional landing gear with wheel pants and a single engine in tractor configuration.

Like its Russian predecessor the T-411 Wolverine was designed for operations from unprepared surfaces.

The aircraft is made from a mix of steel and aluminum, covered in doped aircraft fabric. Its 41.33 ft (12.6 m) span wing is supported by "V" struts and jury struts and has a wing area of 258.9 sq ft (24.05 m^{2}). The cabin width is 45 in (110 cm). The acceptable power range is 300 to 400 hp (224 to 298 kW) and the standard engines used are the 360 hp (268 kW) Vedeneyev M14P radial engine, the 350 hp (261 kW) Continental IO-550 and the 350 hp (261 kW) Lycoming O-540 horizontally opposed powerplants. The aircraft includes provisions for floats and skis.

The T-411 Wolverine has a typical empty weight of 2,425 lb (1,100 kg) and a gross weight of 4,190 lb (1,900 kg), giving a useful load of 1,765 lb (801 kg). With full fuel of 88 U.S. gallons (330 L; 73 imp gal) the payload for the pilot, passengers and baggage is 1,237 lb (561 kg).

The standard day, sea level, no wind, take off with a 360 hp (268 kW) engine is 345 ft (105 m) and the landing roll is 400 ft (122 m).

The manufacturer estimated the construction time from the supplied kit as 1000 hours.

== Operational history ==
By 1998 the company reported that 10 kits had been sold and were completed and flying.

In May 2014 two examples were registered in the United States with the Federal Aviation Administration, although a total of three had been registered at one time.

== Specifications (T-411 Wolverine) ==
Data from AeroCrafter

General characteristics

- Crew: one
- Capacity: four passengers
- Length: 30.71 ft (9.36 m)
- Wingspan: 41.33 ft (12.60 m)
- Wing area: 258.9 sq ft (24.05 m^{2})
- Empty weight: 2,425 lb (1,100 kg)
- Gross weight: 41.33 lb (19 kg)
- Fuel capacity: 88 U.S. gallons (330 L; 73 imp gal)
- Powerplant: 1 × Vedeneyev M14P nine cylinder, air-cooled, four stroke radial aircraft engine, 360 hp (270 kW)
- Propellers: 2-bladed metal constant speed propeller

Performance

- Maximum speed: 150 mph (240 km/h, 130 kn)
- Cruise speed: 130 mph (210 km/h, 110 kn)
- Stall speed: 40 mph (64 km/h, 35 kn)
- Range: 510 mi (820 km, 440 nmi)
- Service ceiling: 10,000 ft (3,000 m)
- Rate of climb: 990 ft/min (5.0 m/s)
- Wing loading: 16.2 lb/sq ft (79 kg/m^{2})
