= Sukhoi Su-31 =

Russian aerobatic aircraft

Su-31
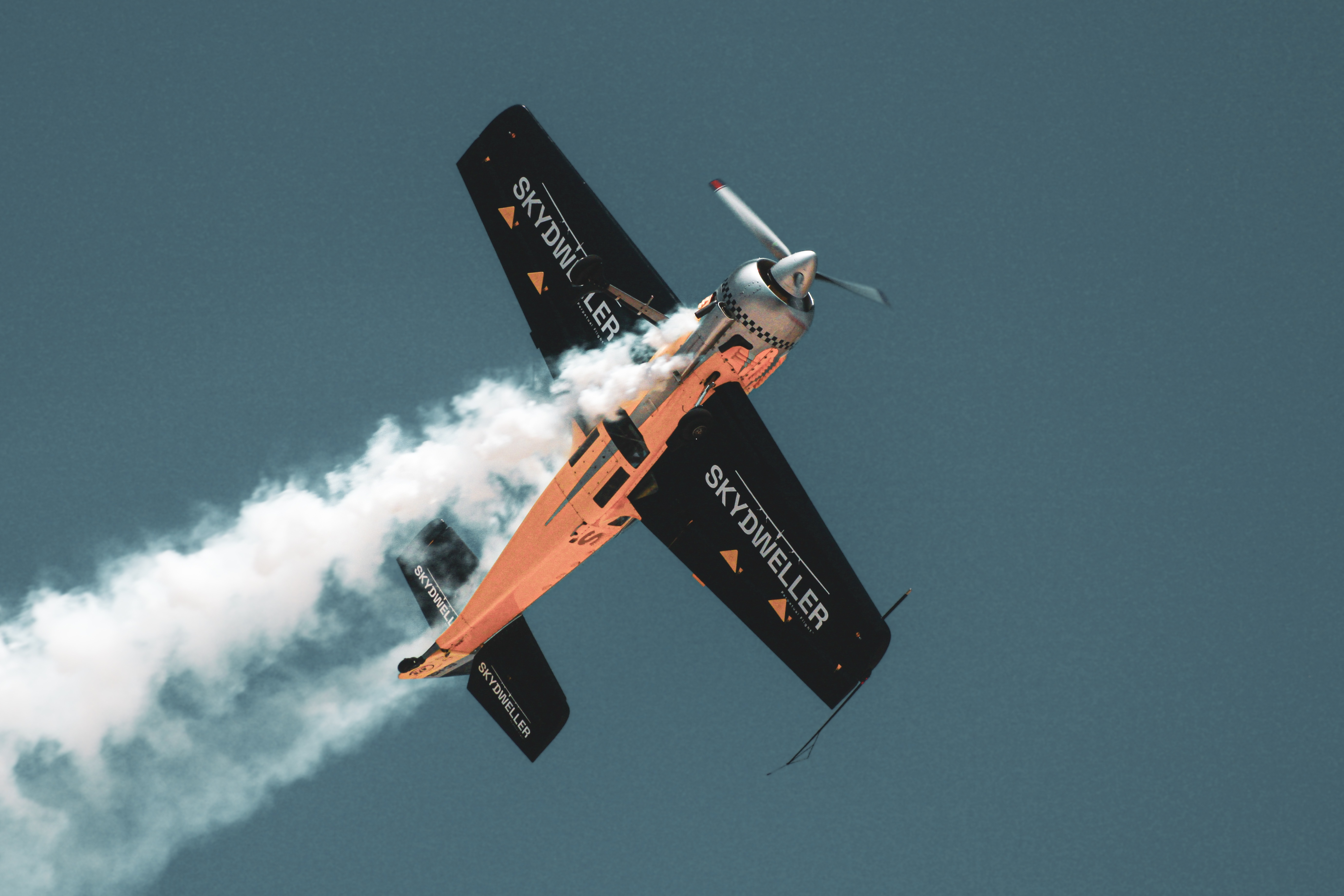
- Sukhoi Su-31 piloted by Ramón Alonso at an Fundación Infante de Orleansairshow in Cuatro Vientos, Madrid.

General information
- Type: Sports aircraft,
- National origin: Russia
- Manufacturer: Sukhoi
- Status: Active

History
- First flight: 1992
- Developed from: Sukhoi Su-29

The Sukhoi Su-31 is a Russian single-engined aerobatic aircraft designed by Sukhoi as a lighter and more powerful version of the Sukhoi Su-29.

== Design and development ==
The design of the aircraft started in 1991 as a single-seat development of the earlier Sukhoi Su-29 with a more powerful Vedeneyev M14PF engine and new landing gear. The low-wing cantilever monoplane first flew in June 1992 as the Su-29T and the first production aircraft flying in 1994.

== Variants ==
Su-29T
Prototype single-seat aerobatic monoplane
Su-31
Production variant with fixed landing gear, sometimes known as the Su-31T.
Su-31M
Improved variant with a pilot extraction system.
Su-31M2
Further improved variant of the Su-31M with weight reduction, single piece canopy/windscreen and larger wing introduced in 1999.
Su-31U
Proposed retractable landing gear variant of the Su-31T.
Su-31X
Export variant of the Su-31T

== Specifications ==
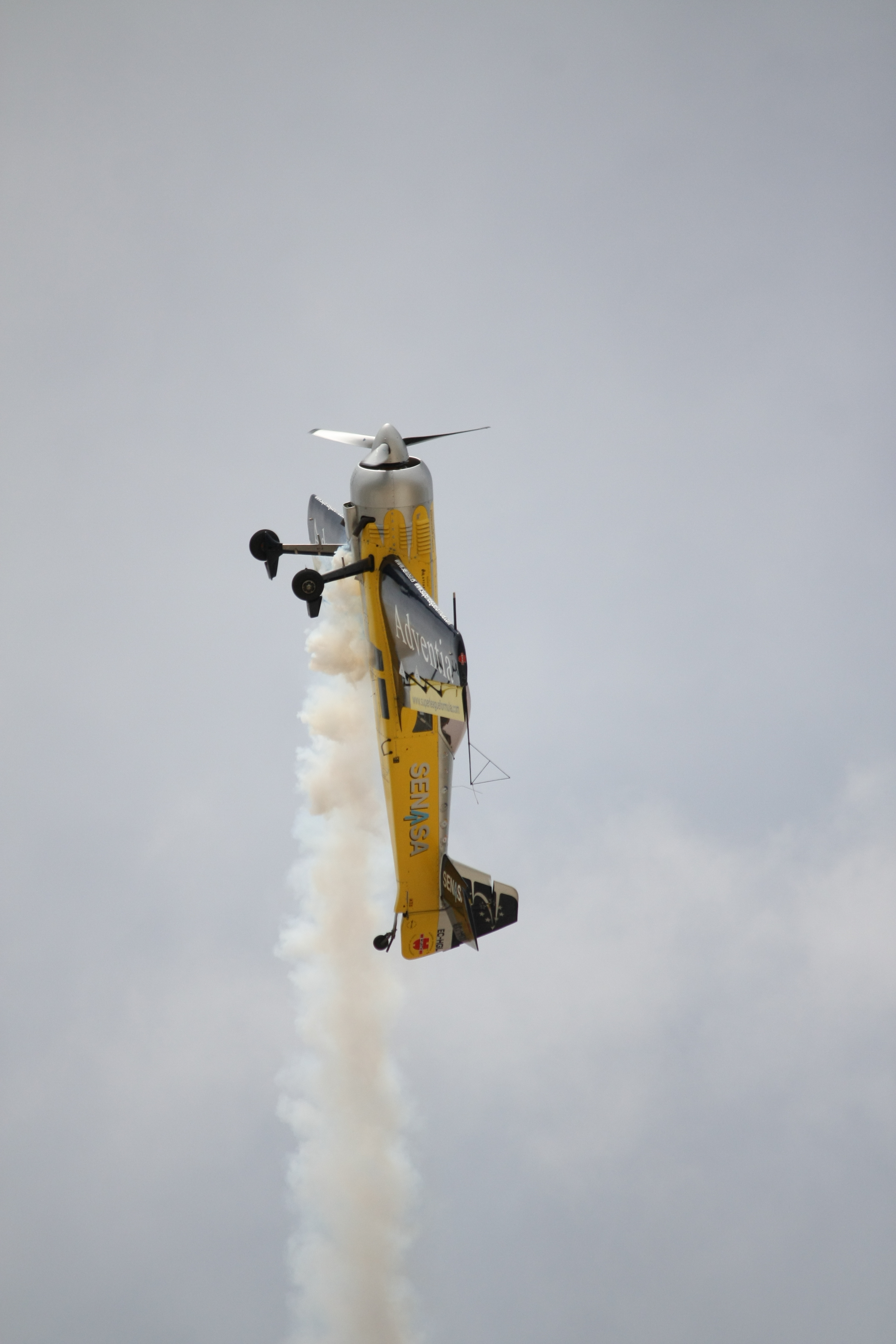
2008 World Aerobatics Champion Ramón Alonso in a Sukhoi Su-31.

Data from Su-26, 29, 31 Specifications

General characteristics

- Crew: 1
- Length: 6.83 m (22 ft 5 in)
- Wingspan: 7.8 m (25 ft 7 in)
- Height: 2.76 m (9 ft 1 in)
- Wing area: 11.83 m^{2} (127.3 sq ft)
- Empty weight: 700 kg (1,543 lb)
- Max takeoff weight: 1,050 kg (2,315 lb)
- Powerplant: 1 × Vedeneyev M14PF 9-cylinder air-cooled radial piston engine, 300 kW (400 hp)
- Propellers: 3-bladed constant-speed propeller

Performance

- Maximum speed: 331 km/h (206 mph, 179 kn)
- Stall speed: 106 km/h (66 mph, 57 kn)
- Never exceed speed: 450 km/h (280 mph, 240 kn)
- Range: 1,100 km (680 mi, 590 nmi)
- g limits: +12 -10
- Roll rate: 401 deg/s - 7 rad/s
- Rate of climb: 24 m/s (4,700 ft/min)

== See also ==
Related development

- Sukhoi Su-26
- Sukhoi Su-29
