= Pitts Model 12 =

American aerobatic aircraft

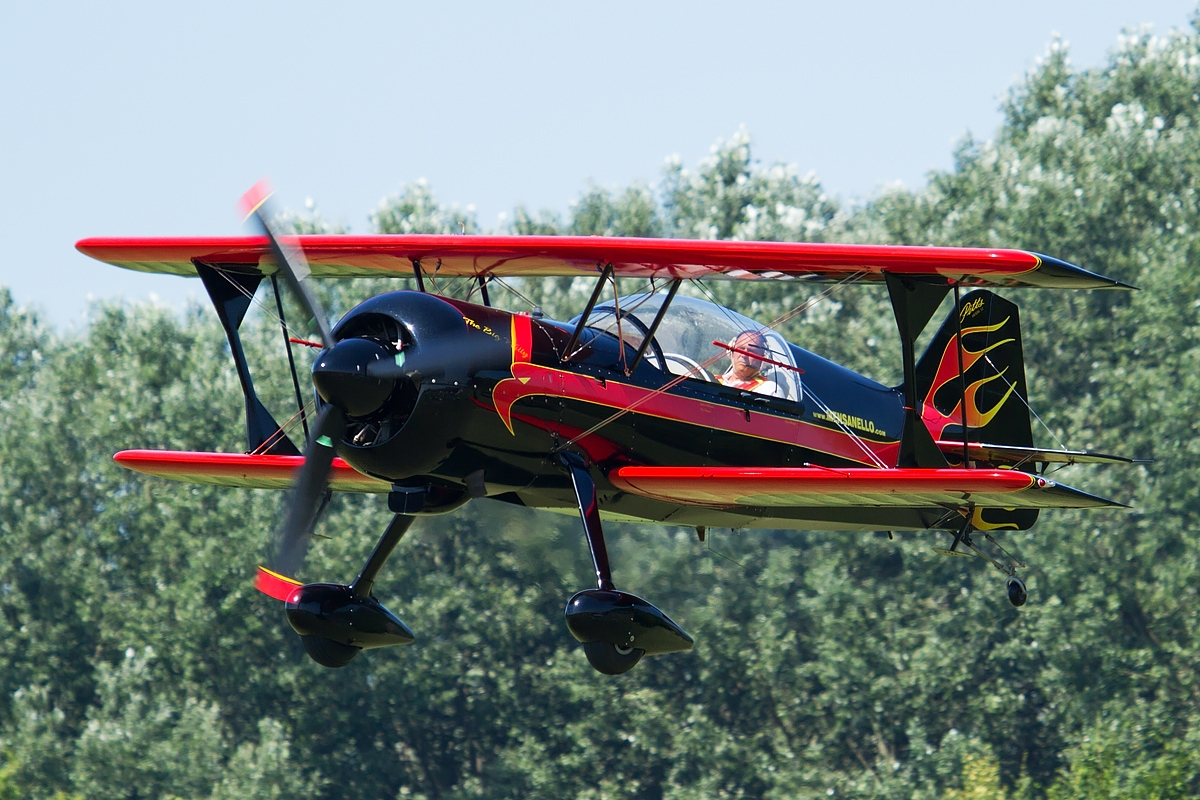
- Factory-built Pitts 12S

General information
- Type: Aerobatic Biplane
- National origin: United States
- Manufacturer: 92nd West Aviation
- Designer: Curtis Pitts
- Number built: 59 (2011)

History
- First flight: March 1996

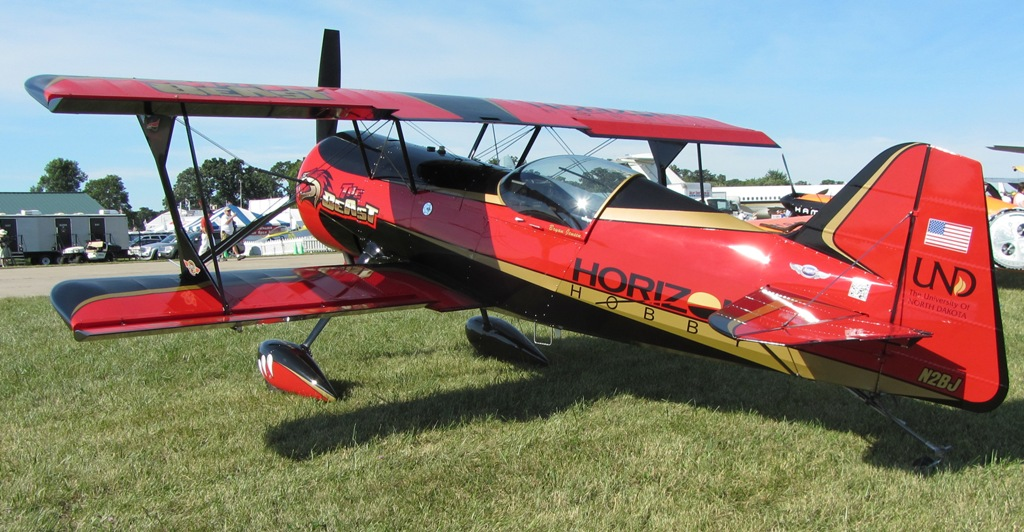
"The Beast" Model 12

The Pitts Model 12 (also known by its nicknames "Bolshoi," "Macho Stinker," and "Pitts Monster") is a high-performance aerobatic biplane designed around the Vedeneyev M14P/PF radial engine. The aircraft can be built from plans or as a kitplane, or bought ready-to-fly from the factory.

== Design and development ==
The Pitts Model 12 was designed by Curtis Pitts starting in 1993. Pitts presented his completed design on his 80th birthday in December 1995.

The Pitts Model 12 is a biplane built using fabric covered welded steel tubing for the fuselage, and fabric covered wings with wood spars. The leading edge is made of formed plywood. The landing gear is solid aluminum.

== Operational history ==
As of December 2011, 59 examples had been completed and flown.

== Variants ==
There are several model variants:

- Plans built
- HP model - kit
- Model 12S - factory built
- A single-place variant called "The Beast" constructed by Jim Kimball

== Specifications (Pitts Model 12) ==
Data from Pitts model 12.com

General characteristics

- Capacity: 2
- Length: 20 ft 6 in (6.25 m)
- Wingspan: 23 ft (7.0 m)
- Empty weight: 1,550 lb (703 kg)
- Gross weight: 2,250 lb (1,021 kg)
- Fuel capacity: 54 gal
- Powerplant: 1 × Vedeneyev M14P/PF , 360 hp (270 kW)
- Propellers: 3-bladed MT Propeller

Performance

- Cruise speed: 150 kn (170 mph, 270 km/h)
- Stall speed: 56 kn (64 mph, 103 km/h)
- Range: 430 nmi (500 mi, 800 km)
- Rate of climb: 2,900 ft/min (15 m/s)
