= Khrunichev T-411 Aist =

Russian light utility monoplane

T-411 Aist
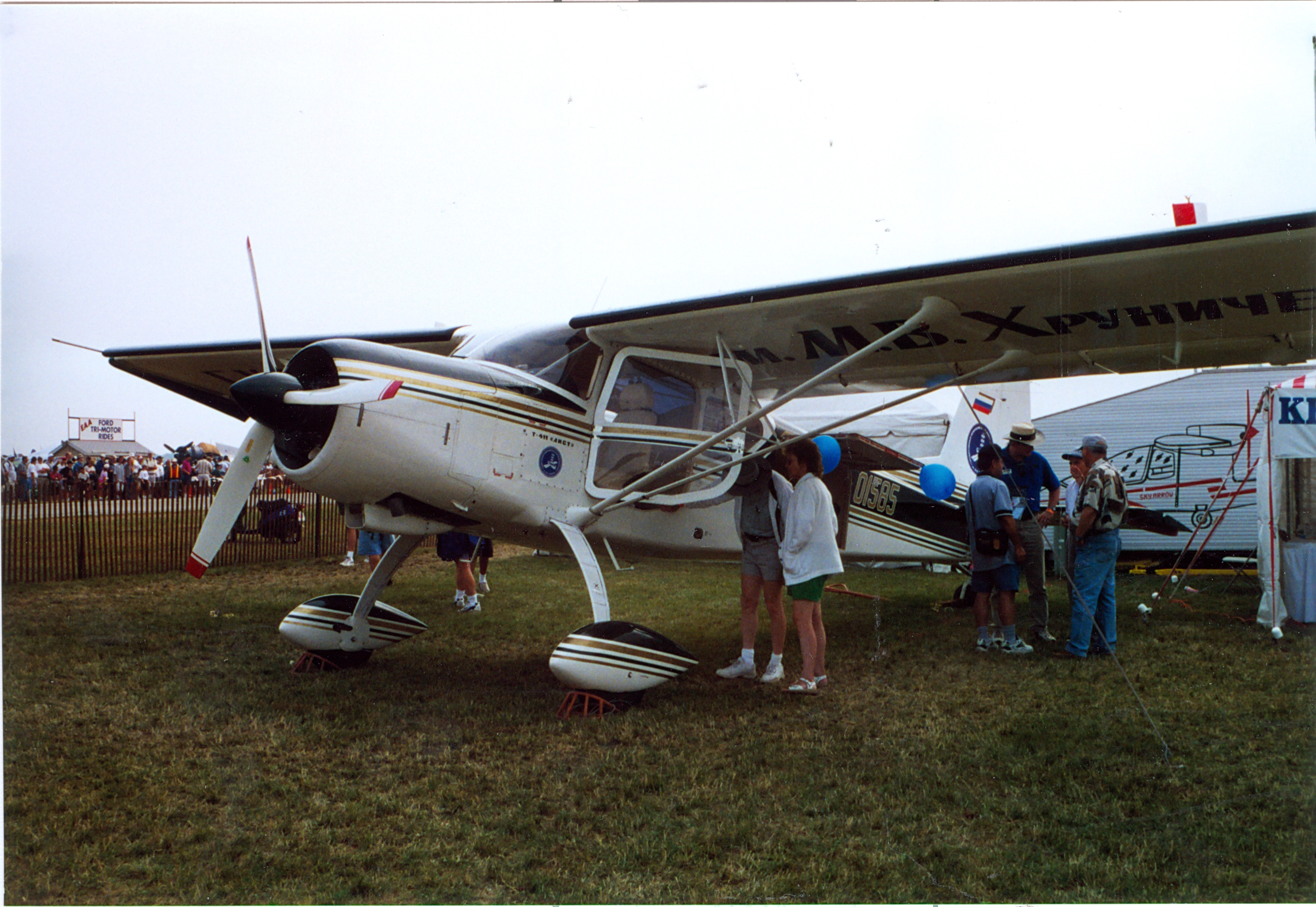

General information
- Type: Light utility monoplane
- National origin: Russia
- Manufacturer: Krunichev OKB

History
- First flight: 10 November 1993
- Variant: Washington T-411 Wolverine

The Krunichev T-411 Aist (en: Stork) is a Russian light utility monoplane designed by the Russian company Aeroprogress and placed into production by the Khrunichev State Research and Production Space Center. A version is marketed in the United States as the Aeroprogress T-411 Wolverine powered by a Continental TSIO-550-B.

A homebuilt derivative design is the Washington T-411 Wolverine.

== Development ==
The ROKS-Aero corporation was set up in Moscow in 1990 to design and manufacture general aviation aircraft, but was renamed Aeroprogress in 1993. In 1992 ROKS-Aero started design of a single-engined light aircraft, the T-411 Aist 2. Construction of the prototype T-411 started in April 1993, making its maiden flight on 10 November 1993. The Khrunichev State Research and Production Space Center set up an aviation department in 1994 and purchased a license to build the Aist. The airframe, however, is produced by Production complex #2 of RAC MIG. It is a high-wing braced monoplane with a tubular-steel fuselage and metal fabric covered wings. The T-411 is powered by a 360 hp Vedeneyev M14P radial piston engine and has either a fixed tail wheel landing gear or can be fitted with floats.

== Specifications ==
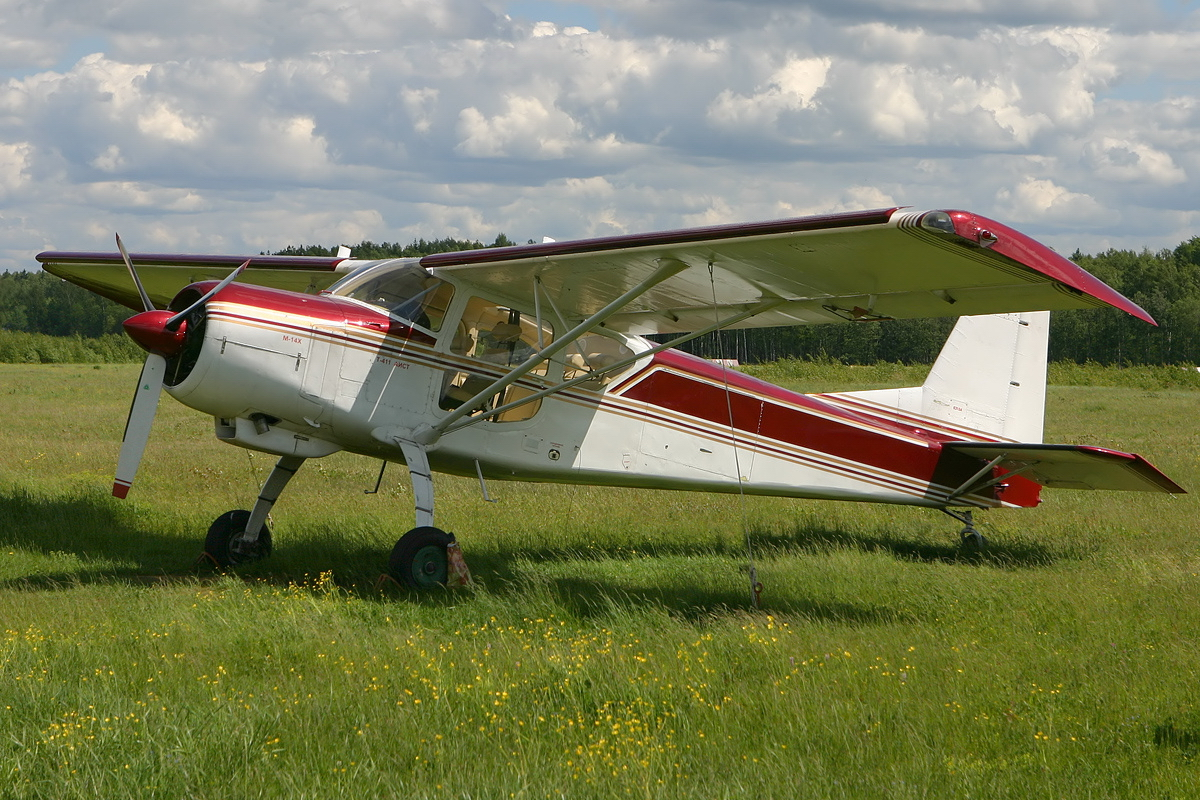
Khrunichev T-411 Aist

Data from Jane's All The World's Aircraft 2003–2004.

General characteristics

- Crew: 2
- Capacity: 3 passengers or 361 kg (795 lb)
- Length: 9.45 m (31 ft 0 in)
- Wingspan: 13.02 m (42 ft 9 in)
- Height: 2.60 m (8 ft 6 in)
- Wing area: 24.30 m^{2} (261.6 sq ft)
- Aspect ratio: 7.0:1
- Airfoil: NACA 23011
- Empty weight: 544 kg (1,199 lb)
- Max takeoff weight: 1,650 kg (3,638 lb)
- Powerplant: 1 × VOKBM M14X 9-cylinder air-cooled radial engine, 268 kW (359 hp)
- Propellers: 3-bladed

Performance

- Cruise speed: 204 km/h (127 mph, 110 kn)
- Stall speed: 93 km/h (58 mph, 50 kn) (flaps down)
- Range: 1,200 km (750 mi, 650 nmi)
- Service ceiling: 3,000 m (9,800 ft)

== See also ==
Related lists

- List of flying boats and floatplanes
