= Chuck Aaron =

American aviator (born 1948)

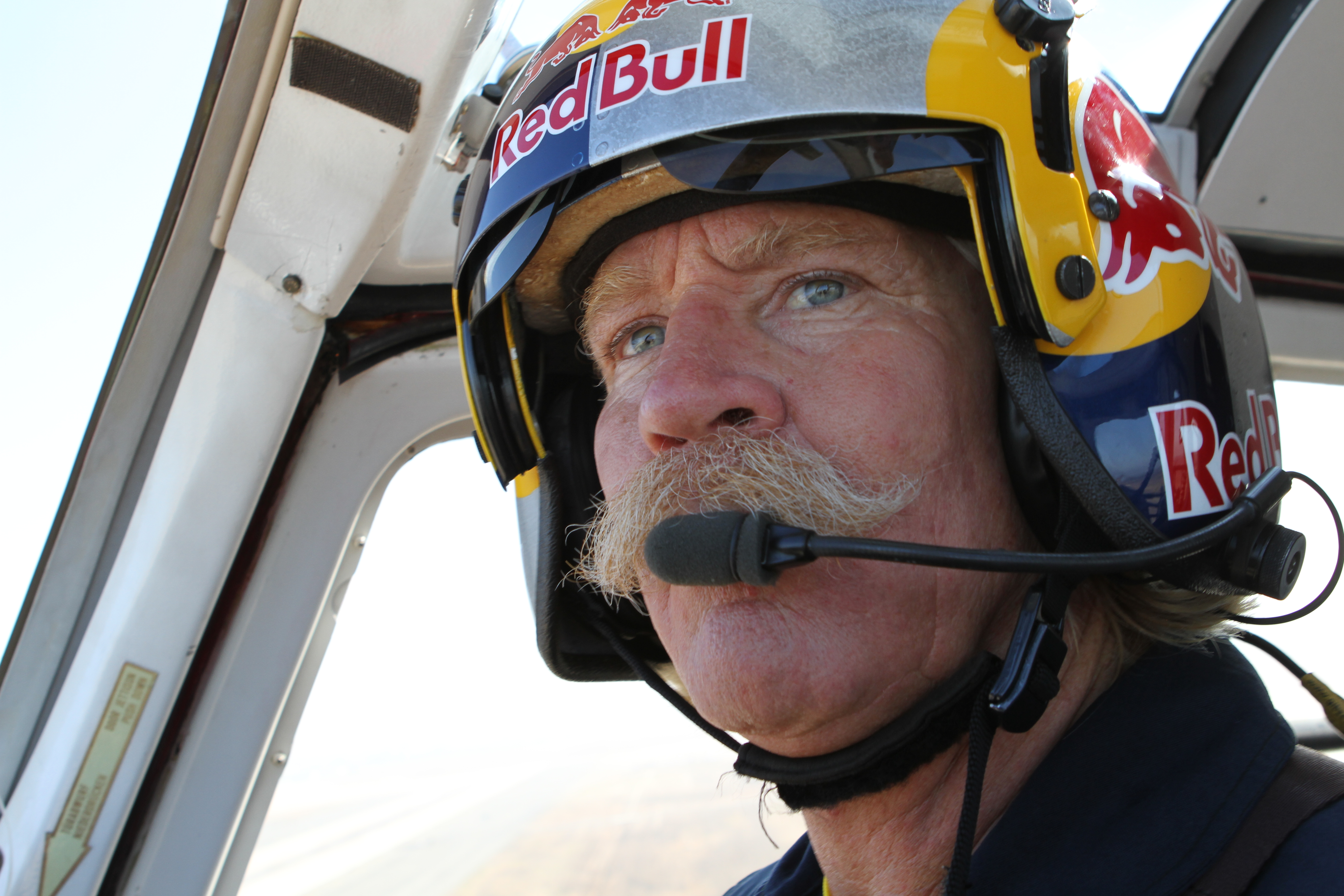
- Chuck Aaron flying over Marine Corps Air Station Miramar on September 29, 2011
- Born: Charles Aaron; 21 November 1948 (age 77); San Antonio, Texas
- Known for: TAH-1F Cobra; Helicopter Aerobatics; Red Bull North America
- Awards: Art Scholl Showmanship (2009); SETP Member (2011); Living Legend of Aviation (2013); HAI Pilot of the Year (2014)
- Aviation career
- First flight: 1968
- Flight license: Fixed-Wing & Helicopter Pilot, Helicopter Aerobatics (2005) (all FAA)

Charles "Chuck" Aaron (born 1948) (call sign "Malibu") is an American pilot notable for being one of a handful of pilots holding an FAA waiver to perform aerobatics in a helicopter in the United States, and one of only four such pilots in the entire world. In 1980, Aaron worked on the air rescue program for NASA's Space Shuttle, and he founded his own company, FX Helicopters in Westlake Village, California in 1997. Aaron announced his retirement from the airshow circuit in 2015 and made his last performance for Red Bull at the November 2015 Red Bull Air Race World Championship in Las Vegas. Chuck Aaron travels around the world as a keynote and aviation speaker, and was recently interviewed at the Smithsonian's National Air and Space Museum.

Aaron is also an experienced test pilot, having test-flown a TADS/PNVS Missile Guidance System for the Boeing AH-64 Apache; and an infrared vision system as the first helicopter pilot to deliberately fly into known brownout conditions to test the MAX VIZ IR camera. He is also an FAA certificated Airframe and Powerplant Mechanic, and has assembled many helicopters, including TAH-1F Cobras from surplus parts.

Aaron performed aerobatic maneuvers—loop, roll, vertical climb, Split S, Cuban Eight, Immelman, and "Chuckcevak" (modified Lomcovak)—at air shows and other demonstrations in an MBB Bo 105, with proprietary modifications invented by Aaron, that allow it to perform maneuvers previously impossible for helicopters. This was featured in the opening sequence of the James Bond film Spectre. He once served as Chief Pilot and Director of A&P Maintenance for Red Bull North America. One of Aaron's TAH-1F Cobras is flown on the European air show circuit, by "The Flying Bulls". It was heavily damaged/destroyed by the R.B. European pilot in an accident in May 2017.

Since 2019, Aaron provides helicopter aerobatics training, consulting services and travels throughout the world as a guest speaker.

== Awards ==
- 1978 Received the "Sikorsky Rescue" Award for Saving a Life as a civilian flying a Sikorsky helicopter
- 2006 Built First Ever FAA Certified Aerobatic Helicopter and Received the First Ever Air Worthiness Certificate from the FAA for an aerobatic helicopter.
- 2009 Art Scholl Showmanship Award
- 2011 became a Member – Society of Experimental Test Pilots
- 2013 became an Inductee – Living Legends of Aviation
- 2014 Awarded the Pilot of the Year Award – by the Helicopter Association International
- 2016 Became a board member of HAI
- 2016 Awarded "Lifetime Member" by the HAI
- 2018 Started the First Ever FAA approved "Helicopter Aerobatic Training School" known
