= Lomcovak =

Aerobatic maneuver

A Lomcovák (or incorrectly spelled Lomcevak) is a family of extreme aerobatic maneuvers where the aircraft, with almost no forward speed, rotates on chosen axes due to the gyroscopic precession and torque of the rotating propeller.

== Etymology ==
The word originates from a quote by the Czechoslovak aerobatic pilot Ladislav Bezák's mechanic at the 1958 air show in Brno, Czechoslovakia. When asked by journalists what Bezák's tumble maneuvers were, he jokingly called them Lomcovaks explaining it means headache.

The expression Lomcovat is commonly used in Moravia to describe the rotating motions of someone who has had one drink too many of its infamous alcoholic drinks called slivovitz. Lomcovák is the slang name for the shot of a strong drink. This expression comes from word "lomcovat" which means to jiggle; shake violently (violently move with short moves with something, what is attached hardly - e.g. the jail grille). The etymology origin is in Lomit which means "to diffract; to divide; braking (rod)," most likely a reference to the stick manipulation during the manoeuvre.

In the 1940s Czech aerobatic pilots called this a Talířek which means a small saucer, after the horizontal rotary movement of the aircraft.

== Description ==
The Lomcovak is a family of freestyle maneuvers performed at airshows. It is not in the Aresti catalogue and therefore may not be flown in competition.

Lomcovaks are very disorienting but otherwise fairly gentle for the pilot. However they are highly stressful on the aircraft structure and should only be performed by aeroplanes built for aerobatics. The worst effects are on the engine mounts, crankshaft and propeller. There have been quite a few cases of major damage to these components during Lomcovaks.

== Flying techniques ==
Flying a Lomcovak will vary in technique from aeroplane to aeroplane and pilot to pilot. Perhaps the most difficult thing about flying them is to use the throttle not as a speed control, but as a control of the gyroscopic precession and torque. There are at least five basic Lomcovaks, each one with several derivatives. These are the three most common types:

=== Main Lomcovak ===
Intention: tumble the airplane continuously with each tumble's plane turned relative to the previous one. Enter from a near vertical climb then let the airspeed decay to near zero and initiate a snap roll by using full down elevator and, for a clockwise rotating engine, full left rudder. The aircraft will rotate on all three axes and perform three end-over-end negative "g" tumbles, each tumble being at about 45° to the plane of the last. The maneuver ends when the aircraft runs out of momentum and begins falling with enough speed for the airflow past the control surfaces to stop the tumbling. Neutralising the controls then causes the aircraft to recover nose down.

=== Cap Lomcovak ===
Intention: execute an outside loop of 360° with the lateral axis vertical to the earth. The pilot enters from a hammerhead turn (stall turn) and as the fuselage reaches knife-edge flight at the top, gives it full down elevator. The result will be the aircraft's pivoting about its wing tip in a perfect pirouette. The throttle is utilised to make the wing remain vertical.

=== Conic Lomcovak ===
Intention: make the fuselage trace a cone inclined at 15° to the vertical. The positive variant uses the nose of the aircraft as the focal point and has the tail describe a full horizontal circle. The bottom of the wing is tangent to the surface of the cone during the entire maneuver. The pilot closes the throttle as soon as rotation starts and opens it to recover. Exit from the maneuver can be achieved via a Hammerhead or a Tailslide.
