= Aerobatic maneuver =

Flight path putting aircraft in unusual attitudes

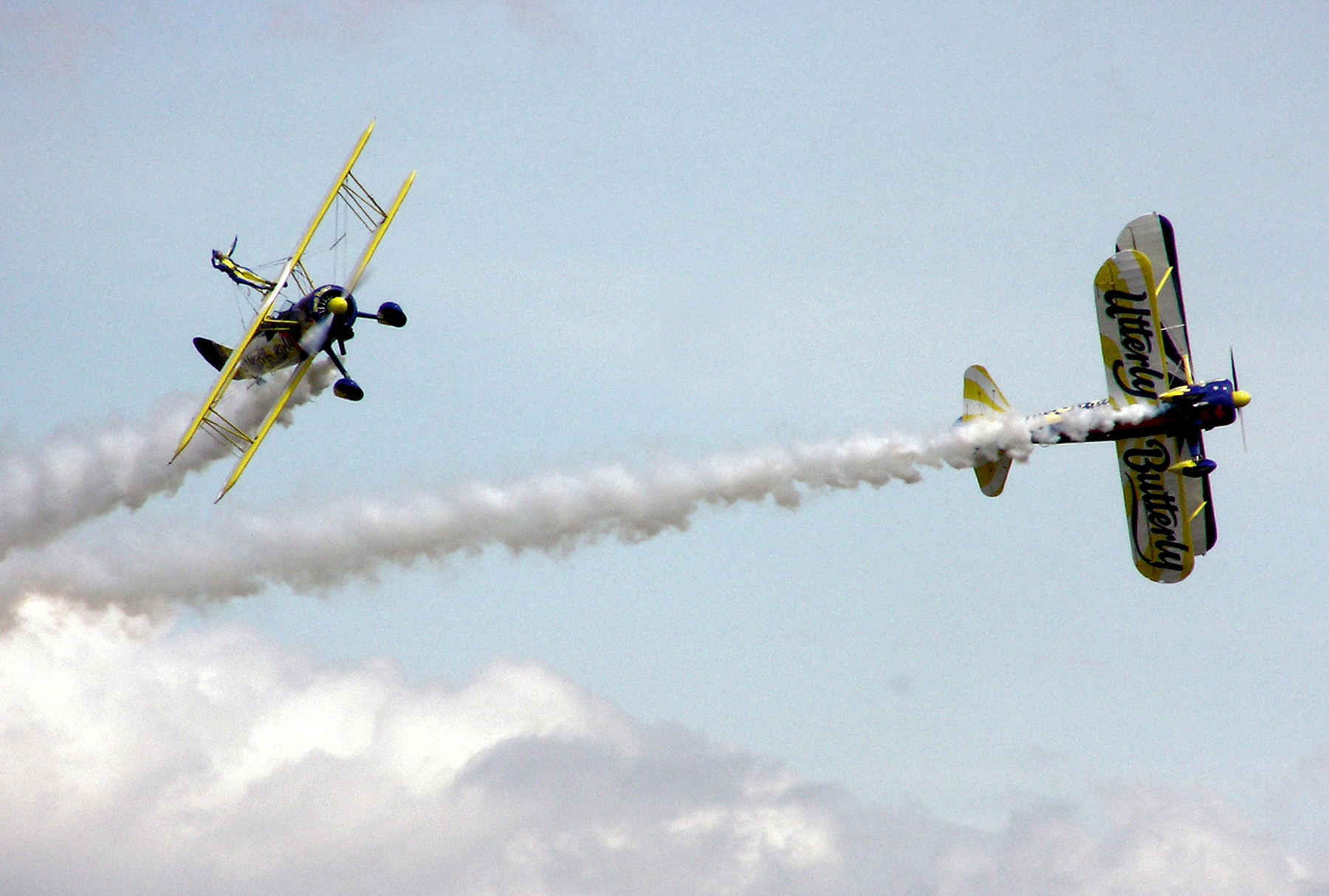
The UK Utterly Butterly display team perform an aerobatic maneuver with their Boeing Stearmans, at an air display in England

An aerobatic maneuver is a complex flight path, used in air shows, dogfights or competition aerobatics. Aerobatics can be performed by a single aircraft or in formation with several others. Nearly all aircraft are capable of performing aerobatics maneuvers of some kind, although it may not be legal or safe to do so in certain aircraft.

== Basic maneuvers ==
Aerobatics consist of five basic maneuvers:

- Lines (both horizontal and vertical),
- loops,
- rolls,
- spins, and
- hammerheads.

Most aerobatic figures are composites of these basic maneuvers with rolls superimposed.

A loop is when the pilot pulls the plane up into the vertical, continues around until they are heading back in the same direction, like making a 360 degree turn, except it is in the vertical plane instead of the horizontal. The pilot will be inverted (upside down) at the top of the loop. A loop can also be performed by rolling inverted and making the same maneuver but diving towards the ground. It can be visualized as making a loop of ribbon, hence the name it is given (see "Gallery" for an animation of a loop). The first loop was performed by Pyotr Nesterov ("Nesterov's loop").

A roll is simply rotating the plane about its roll axis, using the ailerons. It can be done in increments of 360 degrees (i.e. four short 90 degree rolls will bring the aircraft back to its upright position).

A spin is more complex, involving intentionally stalling a single wing, causing the plane to descend spiraling around its yaw axis in a corkscrew motion.

A hammerhead (also known as a stall turn) is performed by pulling the aircraft up until it is pointing straight up (much like the beginning of a loop), but the pilot continues to fly straight up until their airspeed has dropped to a certain critical point. The pilot then uses the rudder to rotate the aircraft around its yaw axis until it has turned 180°deg and is pointing straight down, facing the direction from which the aircraft came. The aircraft gains speed, and the pilot continues and returns to level flight, travelling in the opposite direction from which the maneuver began. It is also known as a "tailslide", from the yawing turn, which is different from the typical method of turning an aircraft in the pitch axis.

== Table of the basic aerobatic figures ==
Most of these can be entered either erect or inverted, flown backwards or have extra rolls added.

Where appropriate, the Aresti Catalog symbols have been included. Not all the figures are competition figures, and so some do not have diagrams to accompany the description.

Reading the diagrams, a figure begins at the small solid circle and ends at the short vertical line. Inverted flight (negative g) is depicted by dashed red lines. The small arrow indicates a rolling maneuver.

Figure Name	Description	Aresti Symbol
Chandelle
Chandelle	Consists of a maximum climb, maximum bank combination to obtain the greatest altitude gain for a given airspeed and at the same time making a 180° course reversal. (Low, positive g maneuver can be performed in all aircraft.)	(Not a competition figure.)
Cuban Eight
Cuban Eight	5/8s of a loop to the 45 degree line, 1/2 roll,3/4s of a loop to the 45 degree line, 1/2 roll, 1/8s of a loop to level flight (half of the Cuban Eight is called a "half Cuban Eight", and the figure can be flown backwards, known as a "Reverse Cuban Eight").
Half Cuban Eight	From level flight, 5/8s loop to the inverted 45° line, 1/2 roll to erect down 45° line, pull to level flight.
Reverse Half Cuban Eight	From level flight pull to the 45° up line, 1/2 roll to inverted 45° up line, then 5/8s of a loop to level flight.
Hammerhead; Stall Turn
Hammerhead; Stall Turn	1/4 loop (pull or push) to vertical, as momentum/airspeed decreases, rudder is applied and the aircraft rotates around its yaw axis, the nose falls through the horizon and points towards the ground, a momentary pause is made to draw the vertical down line, and 1/4 loop to level flight. This figure is sometimes called a stall turn which is a misnomer because the aircraft never actually stalls. The manoeuvre is performed when the aeroplane decelerates through 20 - 30kts (more or less, depending on the aeroplane flown) of airspeed. The cartwheel portion of the hammerhead is performed with full rudder and full opposite aileron. Gyroscopic forces from the propeller during the rapid rate of yaw will produce a pitching and rolling moment and a degree of forward stick will be required to keep the aeroplane from coming off-line over the top. The yaw is stopped with opposite rudder while the ailerons and elevator remain in position, then once the yaw is stopped and the aeroplane is pointed down vertically, all controls are returned to neutral together. Although they can be flown left or right in any aeroplane with the proper technique, a hammerhead is best flown to the left with a clockwise rotating prop, and to the right with an anticlockwise rotating prop (as in a Yakovlev type), due to propeller torque/gyroscopic effects.
Immelmann; Roll-off-the-top; Split S
Immelmann; Immelmann turn; Roll-off-the-top; half loop, half roll	1/2 looping up followed by half a roll. There should be no pause between the end of the looping section and the start of the roll to erect flight.
Split S	Essentially an Immelmann in reverse. Half roll (from erect to inverted) followed by positive pitch to give a half loop. Converts altitude to airspeed, and reverses direction.
Up lines
Vertical up	Fly the aircraft so that the fuselage is perpendicular to the ground (along the wings' zero lift axis). The attitude of the aircraft is judged, not the flightpath, therefore the aircraft may drift downwind during a vertical maneuver.
45° up line	Fly the vertical attitude plus or minus 45°. As for vertical lines the attitude of the aircraft is judged, not the flightpath as viewed by a ground observer, which may differ depending on whether the figure is flown into or with the wind, and the wind strength.
Loop
Inside loop	A vertical circle entered from straight and erect level flight. A positive pitching movement is used at all points in the loop to draw the circle, so that the aeroplane canopy is pointing inwards. Both the inside and outside loop are sometimes casually referred to as a 'loop the loop'.
Outside loop	A vertical circle entered from straight and erect level flight, canopy pointing out of the loop. Loop can be above or below the straight and level entry altitude, from erect or inverted attitude. (Draws extreme negative G)
English bunt	Half an outside loop starting from upright, straight and erect level flight. (The pilot pushes the stick forward and draws a half circle in the sky from the top down).
Spin
Erect spin; Inverted spin; Flat spin	A family of auto-rotational maneuvers, consisting of normal or "flat" spins, either upright or inverted. Two components must exist to spin an aircraft: 1) critical angle of attack (COA), which means that the aircraft is stalled, and 2) yaw.
Tailslide
Bell Tailslide	1/4 looping up, straight vertical (full power) until the aircraft loses momentum. The aircraft falls backwards, tail first, until the nose drops through the horizon to a vertical down position. 1/4 loop (push or pull) to recover to level flight.
Snap Roll; Flick roll; Flick
Snap roll; Flick roll; Flick	A family of rapid autorotational or "horizontal spins," not unlike spins. Rotation is induced by a rapid pitch input followed by rapid yaw input, thus stalling one wing further than the other. This imbalance in lift causes the high speed roll.

- Dive; extreme nose down attitude (not necessarily vertical), resulting in an increase in both airspeed and descent rate.
- Lazy eight; 1/4 looping up, wingover (left or right), 1/2 looping down+up, wingover (right or left), 1/4 looping down
- Lomcovak; family of autorotational, tumbling figures. In all varieties, the aircraft appears to tumble out of control. For example, one style involves the aircraft tumbling (simultaneously) nose over tail and wingtip over wingtip in a negative-g, gyroscopic condition. Introduced by Czechoslovaks such as Ladislav Bezák, and others.
- Pugachev's Cobra; the nose of the aircraft is pulled up suddenly. The aircraft pitches up to 90–120° angle of attack. The nose then falls back to the horizontal, and the aircraft accelerates away in the original direction
- Kulbit; post-stall maneuver similar to Pugachev's Cobra, but going to 360° pitch angle, flying a "loop"
- Roll; Rotational motion around the longitudinal axis (the nose rotates around its center).
- Barrel roll; a combination of a loop and a roll. The flight path during a barrel roll has the shape of a horizontal corkscrew and follows a helical path.
- Aileron roll; 360° revolution about the longitudinal axis at maximum roll rate. It consists of a pitch-up followed by a roll which is uncontrolled in the pitch axis, resulting in an initial climb, and then descent to the original altitude.
- Slow roll; roll around the longitudinal axis slowly, maintaining level flight by cross-controlling the elevator and rudder inputs.
- Hesitation roll; slow roll, stopping momentarily at various points during the roll. Common variations include a two-point roll, three-point roll, four-point roll, etc...
- The Scissors; flying in a zigzagging pattern, either horizontal or rolling.
- Standing eight; inside loop, 1/2 roll (inverts the aircraft), inside loop (towards the ground) 1/2 roll on top of the loop
- Wingover; left or right 180° tight turn (yaw) at the top of a 1/4 looping (up)
- Zoom climb; dive followed by extreme nose up attitude (not necessarily vertical). Consists of an initial airspeed gain resulting in an increased rate of climb, followed by airspeed loss and decreased rate of climb, returning to the original speed and altitude.
- Falling leaf; throttle off, wings-level stall, allowing the plane to side-slip in one direction, then countering the slip with rudder before a spin develops, allowing it to side-slip to the other direction, countering with rudder again, diving to exit the maneuver.
- Torque roll; tailslide performed with aileron added in the direction of the engine torque. The aircraft climbs in the vertical until forward momentum is lost, and rolls due to the torque of the engine as it tailslides.

== Gallery ==
Inside loop

half roll - positive loop - half roll

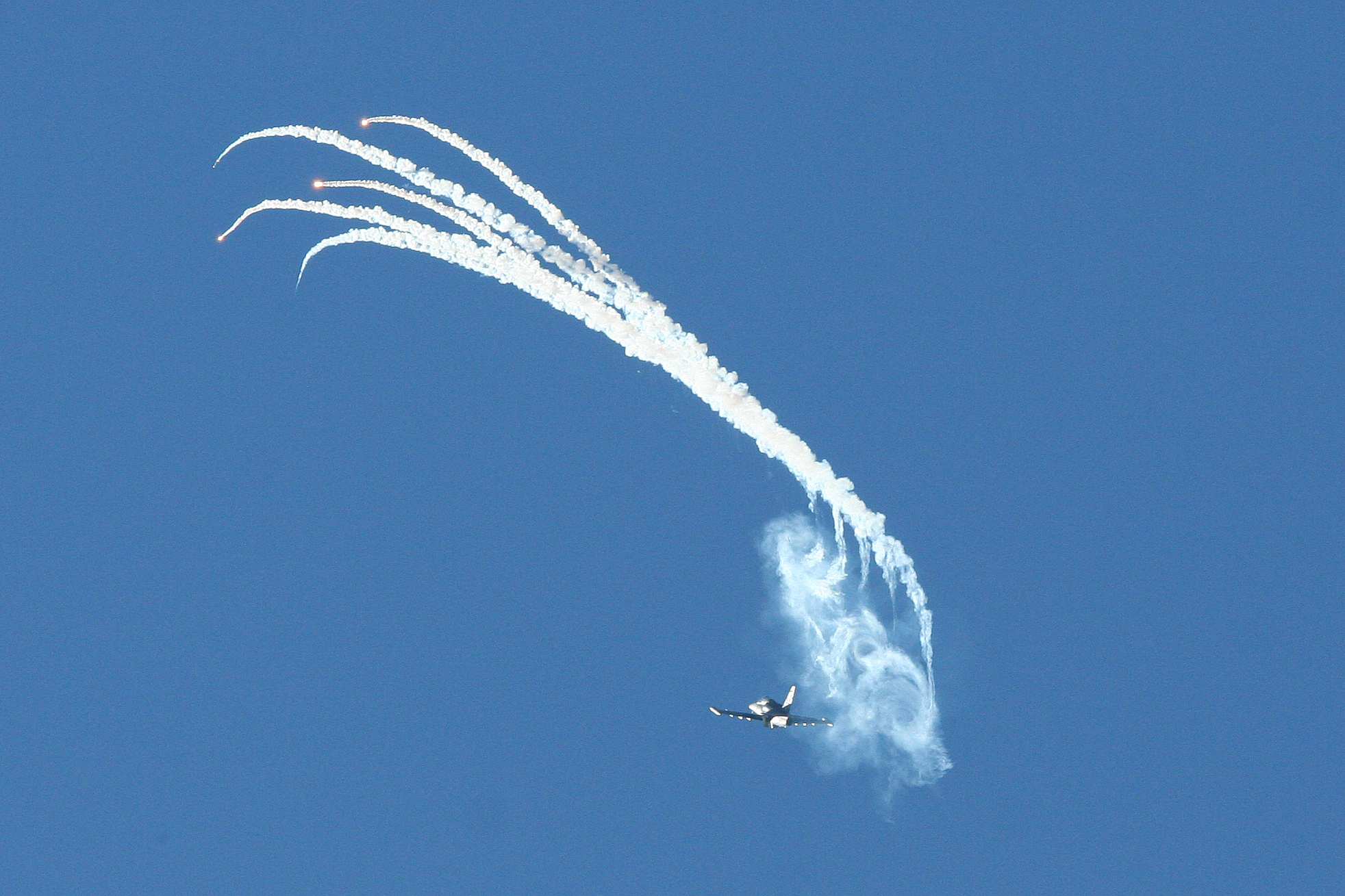
Falling leaf, with flares deployed

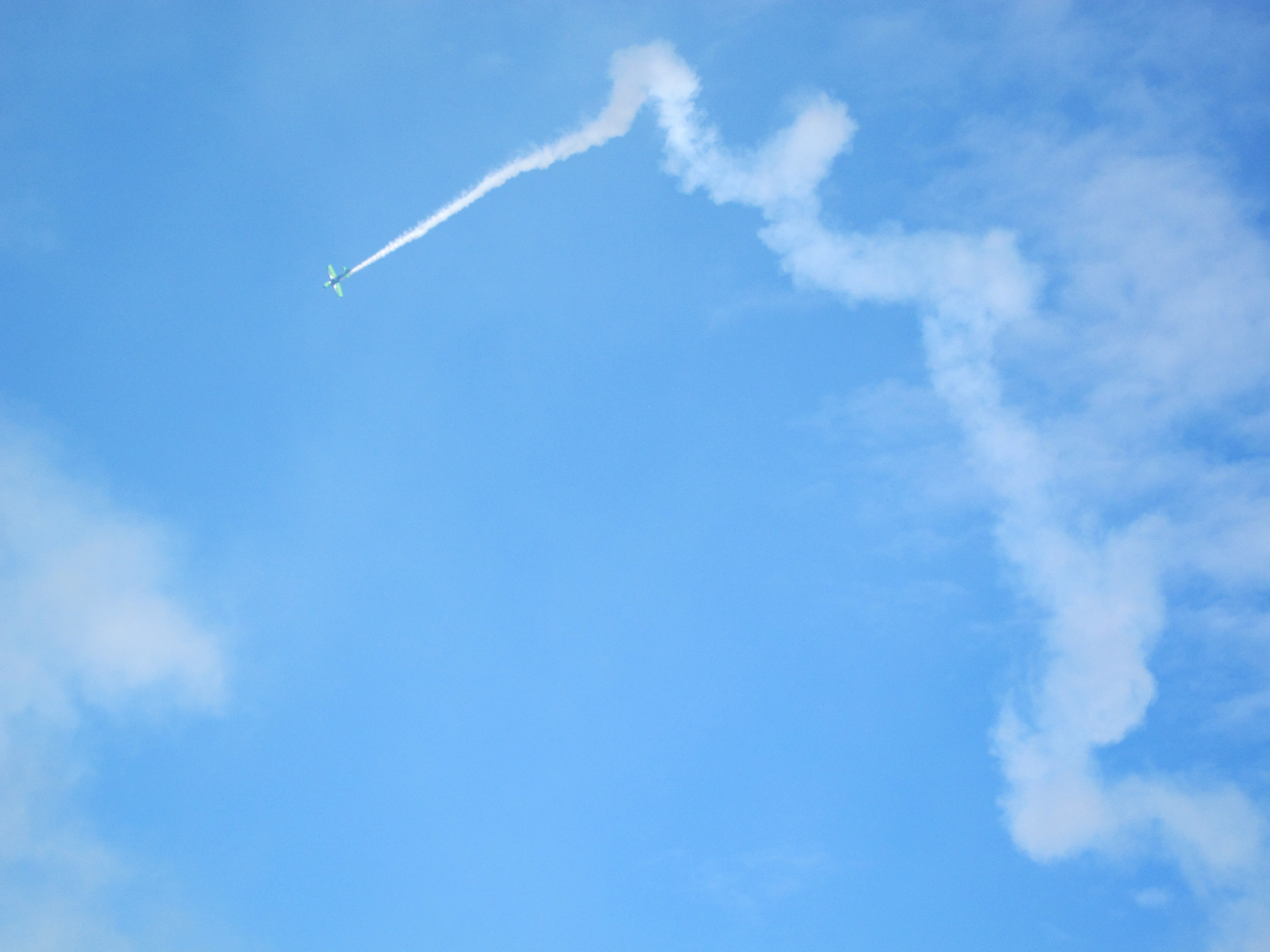
Climbing spin

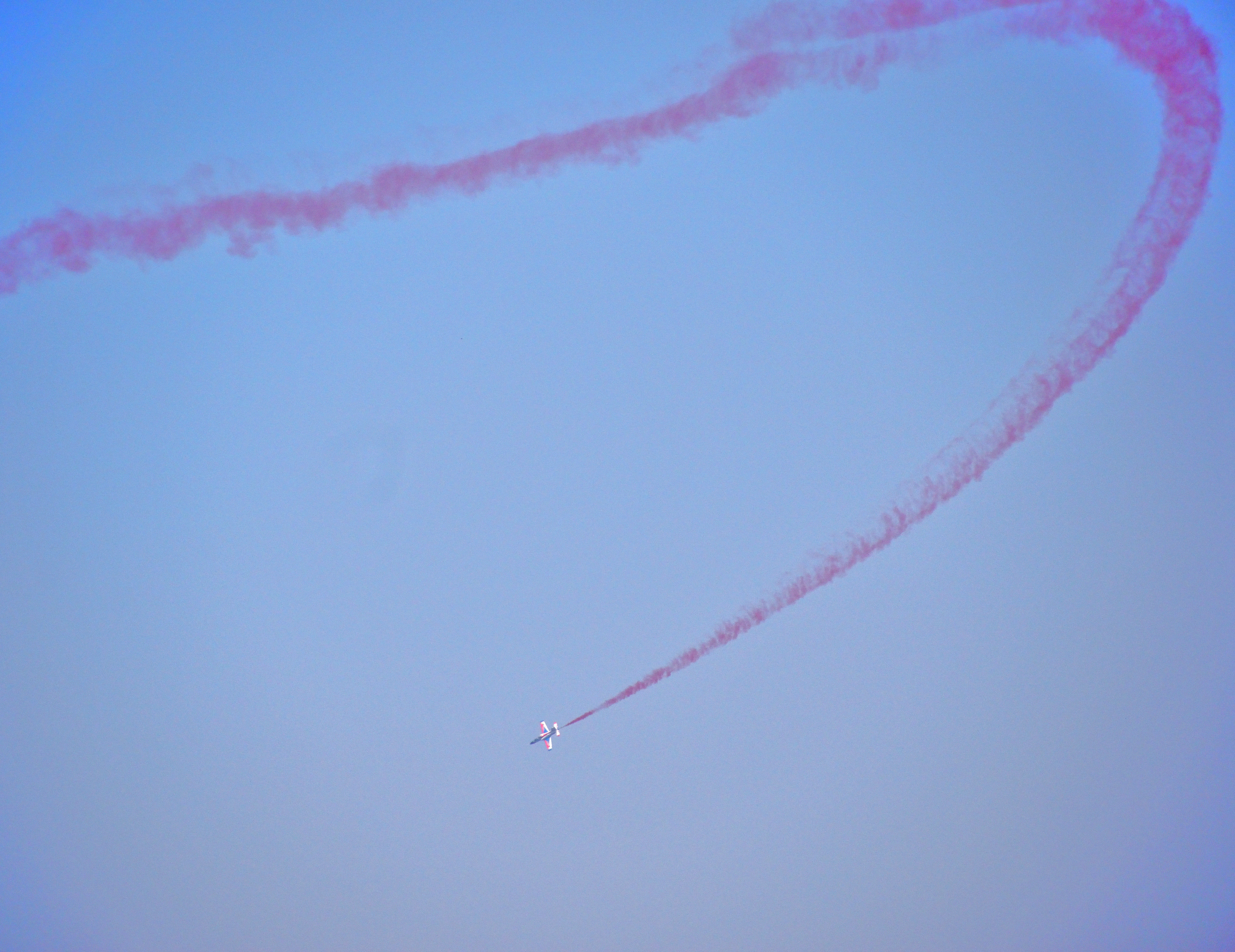
English bunt

Lazy eight

== See also ==
- Basic fighter maneuvers
- Competition aerobatics
- Flight dynamics
- Whifferdill turn
