= Whifferdill turn =

Aerobatic maneuver

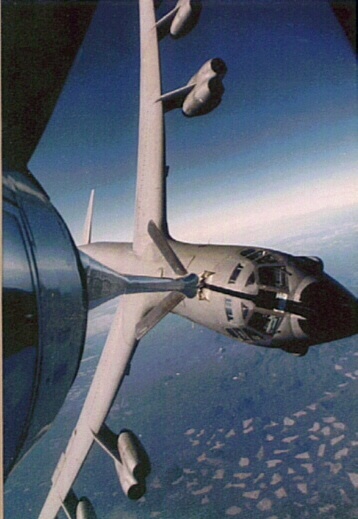
A B-52 Stratofortress and KC-135 Stratotanker performing a whifferdill turn while performing an aerial refueling maneuver

A whifferdill turn (also wolferdil, whiferdill, or (chiefly Canadian & British) whifferdale or wifferdale manoeuvre) is any of a number of aerobatic maneuvers performed in an aerial flight show or while flying aggressively. It is a turn with both horizontal and vertical components, usually performed at the end of one maneuver in preparation for the next. As the plane is climbing the pilot makes a turn reversal, and as the plane descends it is turned so that it can make its next maneuver.

Aviators often use the term as slang for any multi-axis movement or comical / interesting / unusual movement.

The whifferdill is a basic aerial warfare maneuver that is used to reverse course in a dogfight with very little loss of energy/airspeed. It is also a fundamental maneuver used in air shows.

== Astronautics ==
In astronautics, a whifferdill is a maneuver used during orbital rendezvous when the target is on a different orbital plane from the piloted vehicle. Due to the nature of orbits, the target will seem to make a helical motion relative to vehicle as the orbit progresses. A wifferdill maneuver is used to quickly realign the orbital plane of the vehicle with the target and stay near the target's orbital position or mean anomaly. Due to the short time and positional requirements, the maneuver uses a significant amount of fuel and can be difficult to execute successfully. In the case of Gemini 10 the need for the maneuver was a result of misalignment of the inertial guidance platform, causing axial drift of the approach trajectory, prior to closing to docking distance.
