= FIDAE =

Air show in Santiago, Chile

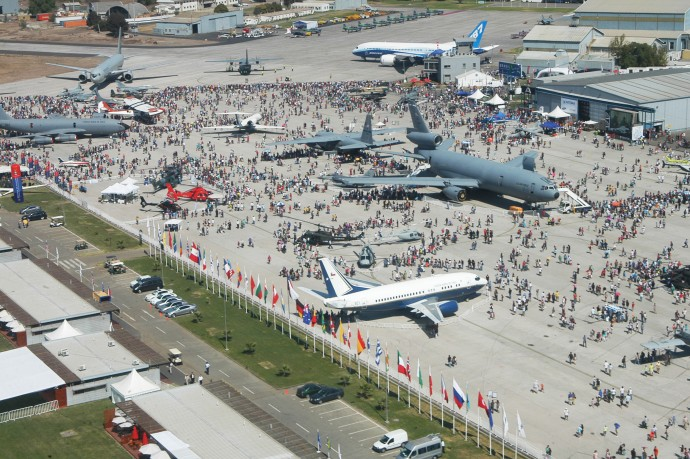
- FIDAE 2014
- Genre: Air show
- Dates: March/April
- Frequency: Biennial: Even years
- Location: Santiago
- Country: Chile
- Established: 1980; 46 years ago
- Most recent: 2024
- Next event: 2026

FIDAE (Feria Internacional del Aire y del Espacio) is a biennial international Air Show held in Santiago, Chile. The first show, FIDA'80 was held in 1980. Since 1990 was renamed to its current name. It is considered the largest and most important aeronautical and space fair in Latin America and the Southern Hemisphere.

FIDAE 2020 (planned for March 31 - April 5, 2020) was cancelled due to COVID-19 pandemic

2 Years later in 2022, FIDAE returned with less air shows(Russian Aerobatic Team), due to the Russian Invasion of Ukraine

== Editions ==
- FIDA'80: First edition, to celebrate the 50th anniversary Chilean Air Force
- FIDA'82
- FIDA'84
- FIDA'86
- FIDA'88
- FIDAE 1990
- FIDAE 1992
- FIDAE 1994
- FIDAE 1996
- FIDAE 1998
- FIDAE 2000
- FIDAE 2002
- FIDAE 2004
- FIDAE 2006
- FIDAE 2008
- FIDAE 2010
- FIDAE 2012
- FIDAE 2014
- FIDAE 2016
- FIDAE 2018
- FIDAE 2020(Cancelled due to COVID-19 pandemic)
- FIDAE 2022
