= Ladislav Bezák =

Czechoslovak aerobatic pilot (1932–2018)

Ladislav Bezák (1932 – November 2018) was a Czechoslovak aerobatic pilot, the first winner of the FAI World Aerobatic Championships in 1960, and first to win the Biancotto Trophy in 1965. In 1971, he defected by flying to West Germany. He loaded his wife and four sons into a two-seat Zlín Z 226 that took off in Prague and landed in Nuremberg, where all six were granted political asylum by West Germany. He is famous for performing the Lomcovák acrobatic maneuver for the first time. Bezák died in November 2018.

== See also ==
- Competition aerobatics

== Sources ==
- Ladislav Bezak, revista Quick exklusiv
- Ladislav Bezak, the flying uncle, Nathalie Delcroix
- International sporting career, germanaerobatics.com
- Web site
