= Stall turn =

Aerobatics turn-around maneuver

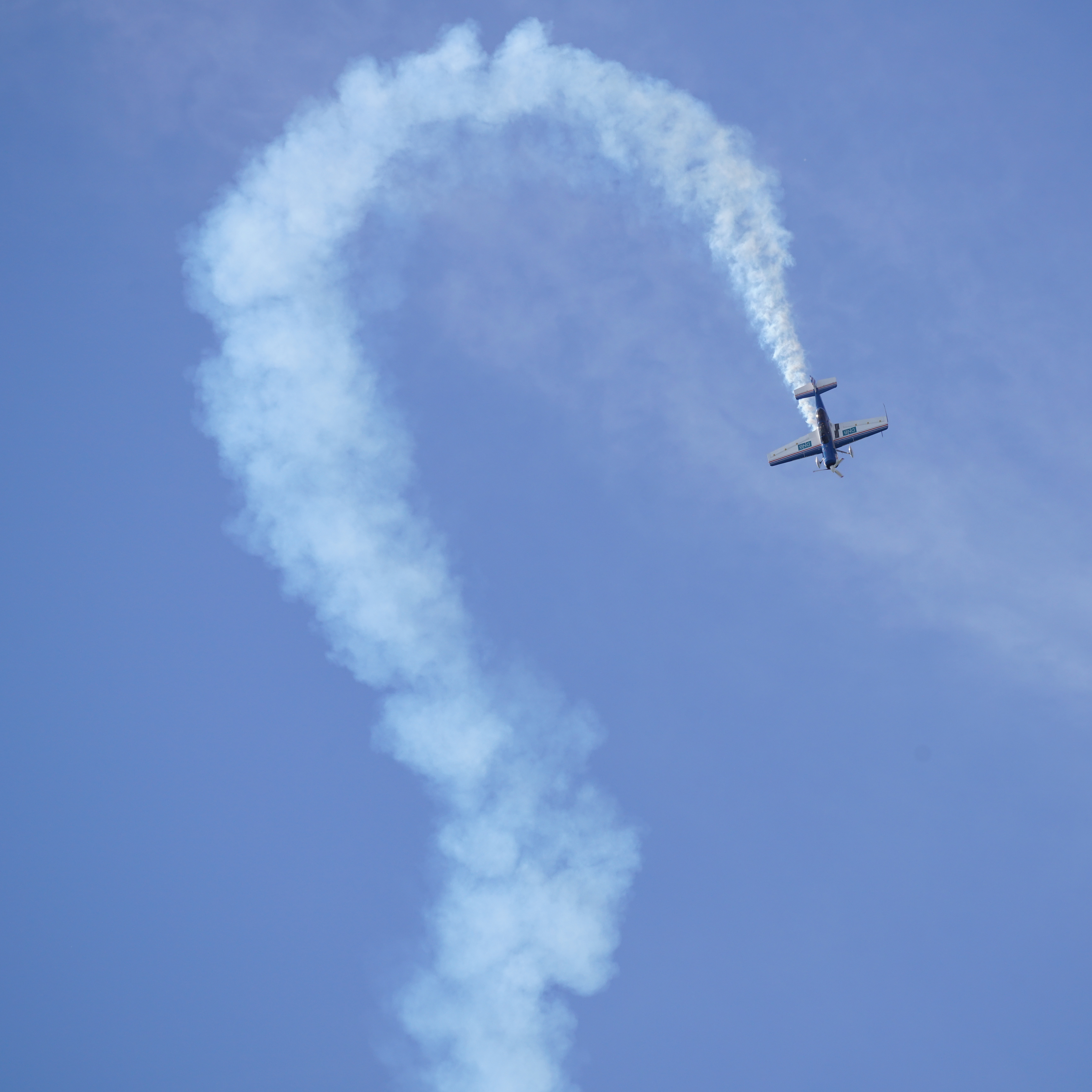
Sukhoi Su-29 performing a stall turn at the air show in Uppsala, Sweden, 2018.

Stall turn by the Halcones of the Chilean Air Force

The hammerhead turn, stall turn, or Fieseler is an aerobatics turn-around maneuver, pioneered by WWI ace and aircraft designer Gerhard Fieseler.

== Description ==
Enter at full power and maximum airspeed. Pull the aircraft up through a quarter loop into a vertical climb. The speed will decay but before upward motion stops firmly apply full rudder to yaw the aircraft through a cartwheel of 180° until the nose is straight down. Dive vertically to the same altitude as the maneuver started, then pull out, exiting in the opposite direction.

== Flying technique ==
The timing of applying full rudder is critical. If instigated too soon it results in a wingover. If instigated too late the plane will fall into a sideslip or else enter a tailslide which most aircraft are restricted from doing.

Performing the pivot requires sufficient airflow over the rudder. In planes with a suitably-positioned propeller, the propwash may provide this. Otherwise, rudder must be applied sooner while the plane still has forward airspeed.

This maneuver demands there be no rolling at all but when airflow is minimal ailerons become ineffective. So as soon as the yaw is established reduce throttle to prevent the aircraft from rolling due to engine torque. Do not open the throttle again until the dive when sufficient airspeed has been gained for aileron control. Reduced throttle will also prevent gyroscopic precession from pitching the nose up.

Higher lift from the faster moving outside right wing will roll the airplane to the left. To maintain attitude in addition to left rudder, holding forward right stick necessary throughout the pivot. Depending on the direction of the turn, the opposite may apply.

== SAR reversal ==
This maneuver has also been called the search and rescue reversal. SAR helicopters fly this when hunting survivors or submarines, because it brings the aircraft directly back along the same course to verify the target. The maneuver does not require visual meteorological conditions (VMC) if the pilot is proficient at maintaining altitude by keeping the lateral acceleration ball centered, as any uncoordinated lateral acceleration will induce spatial disorientation.

== Notation ==
Aresti Catalog's notation of stall turn

The aircraft begins at the dot, and pulls into a vertical climb. The small angled line at the top indicates a stall turn (without indicating the orientation after the turn). The plane then descends, pulls into horizontal flight, and ends at the small vertical line.

== See also ==
- Fieseler
- Gerhard Fieseler
