= Cuban eight =

Aerobatic maneuver

A Cuban eight or Cuban 8 is a figure eight aerobatic maneuver for both full-scale and radio-controlled fixed-wing aircraft.

Variations include the half Cuban eight and reverse half Cuban eight, intended as directional changes and which are listed below. Both the basic maneuver and its name are said to have been invented by Len Povey, an American pilot who had served with the Cuban Air Force. Somewhat by accident he performed it in 1936 at the All American Air Race Meeting, which was held in Miami. Povey had intended to perform snap rolls at the top of a loop but was going too fast, so elected to continue over the top of the loop and on a whim, did a half-roll on the way down and did a symmetrical figure in the other direction. When asked later what maneuver it was, Povey responded, "Just a Cuban eight".

According to the Aresti Catalog, a Cuban eight is performed thus:

5/8s of a loop to the 45 degree line, 1/2 roll, 6/8s of a loop to the 45 degree line, 1/2 roll, 1/8s of a loop to level flight (half of the Cuban Eight is called a "half Cuban Eight", and the figure can be flown backwards, known as a "Reverse Cuban Eight").

== Half Cuban eight ==
From level flight, 5/8s loop to the inverted 45° line, 1/2 roll to erect down 45° line, pull to level flight. The move is similar to an Immelmann turn with the difference being in the location in the loop at which the roll is performed. The roll in an Immelmann turn is at the top of the loop.

== Reverse half Cuban eight ==
From level flight pull to the 45° up line, 1/2 roll to inverted 45° up line, then 5/8s of a loop to level flight.
