= Dogfight =

Combat between aircraft that is conducted at close range

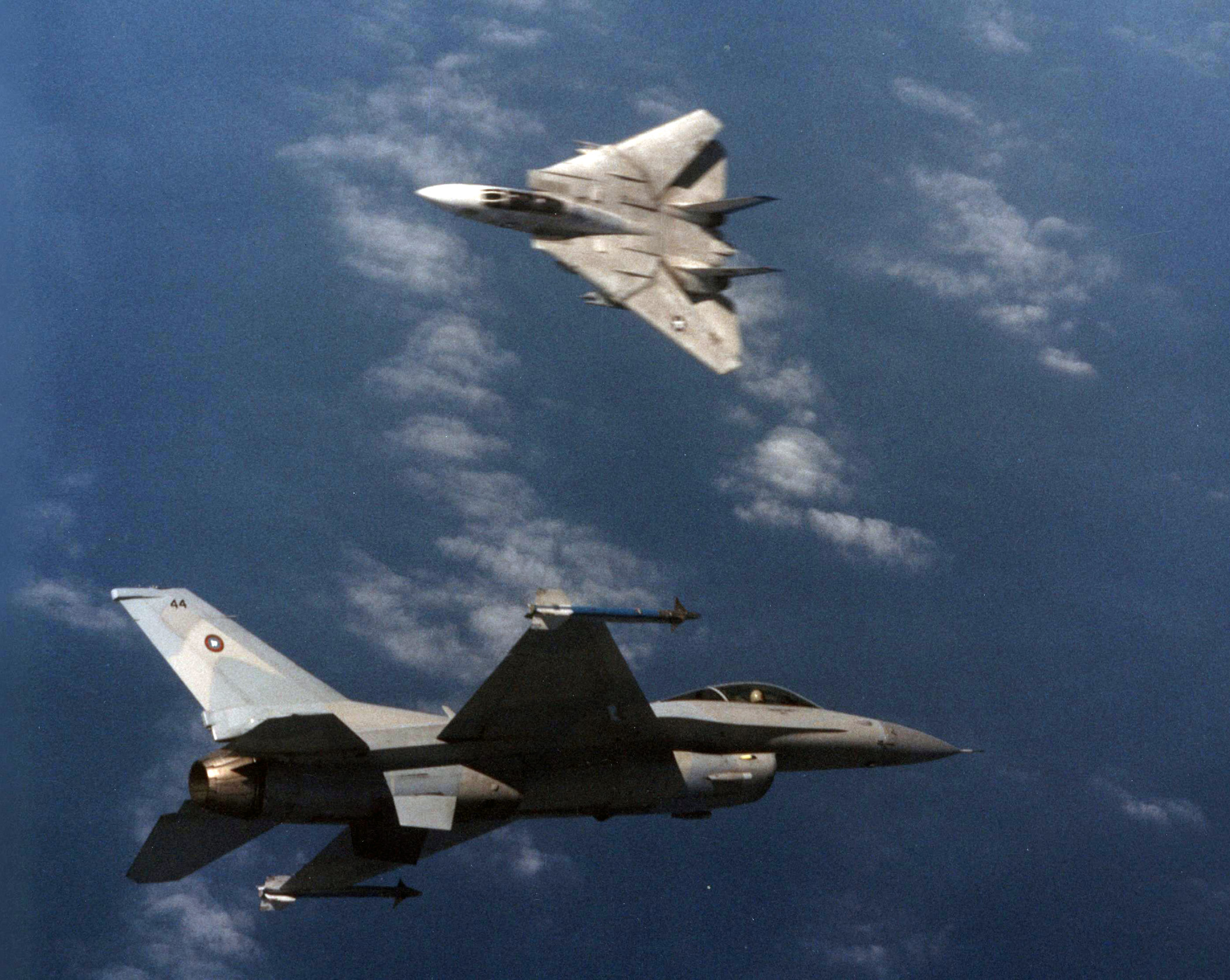
An F-16 Fighting Falcon and an F-14 Tomcat engaged in a mock dogfight as part of U.S. Navy TOPGUN training

A dogfight, or dog fight, is an aerial battle between fighter aircraft that is conducted at close range. Modern terminology for air-to-air combat is air combat manoeuvring (ACM), which refers to tactical situations requiring the use of individual basic fighter maneuvers (BFM) to attack or evade one or more opponents. This differs from aerial warfare, which deals with the strategy involved in planning and executing various missions.

Dogfighting first occurred during the Mexican Revolution in 1913, shortly after the invention of the airplane. It was a component of every major war after that, though with steadily declining frequency, until the end of the Cold War in the early 1990s. Since then, longer-range weapons such as beyond-visual-range missiles have made dogfighting largely obsolete.

Video of the F-15 Eagle's dogfighting capabilities

== Etymology ==
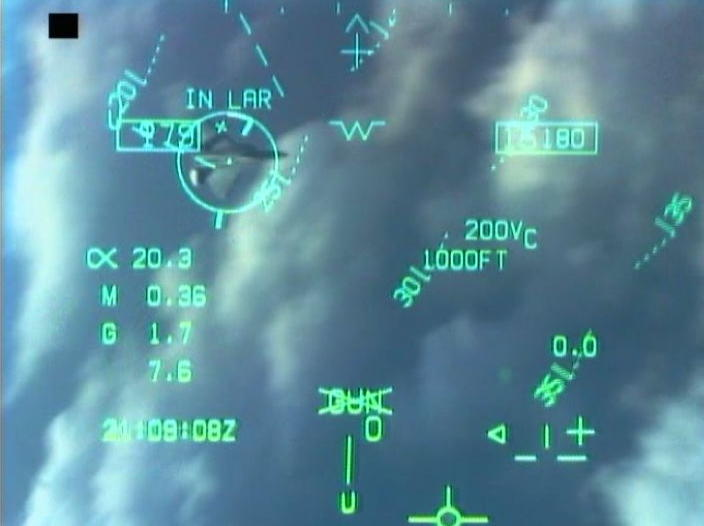
Head-up display of an F/A-18 Hornet during dogfight simulations

The term dogfight has been used for centuries to describe a melee: a fierce, fast-paced battle at close quarters between two or more opponents. The term gained popularity during World War II, although its first use in reference to air combat can be traced to the latter years of World War I. One of the first written uses of the word in that sense was in an account of the death of Baron von Richthofen in The Graphic in May 1918: "The Baron joined the mêlée, which, scattering into groups, developed into what our men call a dog fight". On March 21, 1918, several British newspapers published an article by Frederic Cutlack in which the word was used in the modern sense: "A patrol of seven Australian machines on Saturday met about twenty of this [i.e., von Richthofen's] circus at 12,000 feet. Ten of the enemy dived to attack our men. A regular dogfight ensued for half a minute."

== History ==
=== Mexican Revolution ===
The first supposed instance of plane on plane combat and the first instance of one plane intercepting another during an aerial conflict apparently occurred during the Mexican Revolution on November 30, 1913, between two American mercenaries fighting for opposing sides, Dean Ivan Lamb and Phil Rader. The story comes from Lamb himself. According to his own statements in an interview two decades later, both men had orders to kill, but neither pilot wanted to harm the other, so they exchanged multiple volleys of pistol fire, intentionally missing before exhausting their supply of ammunition.

=== World War I ===
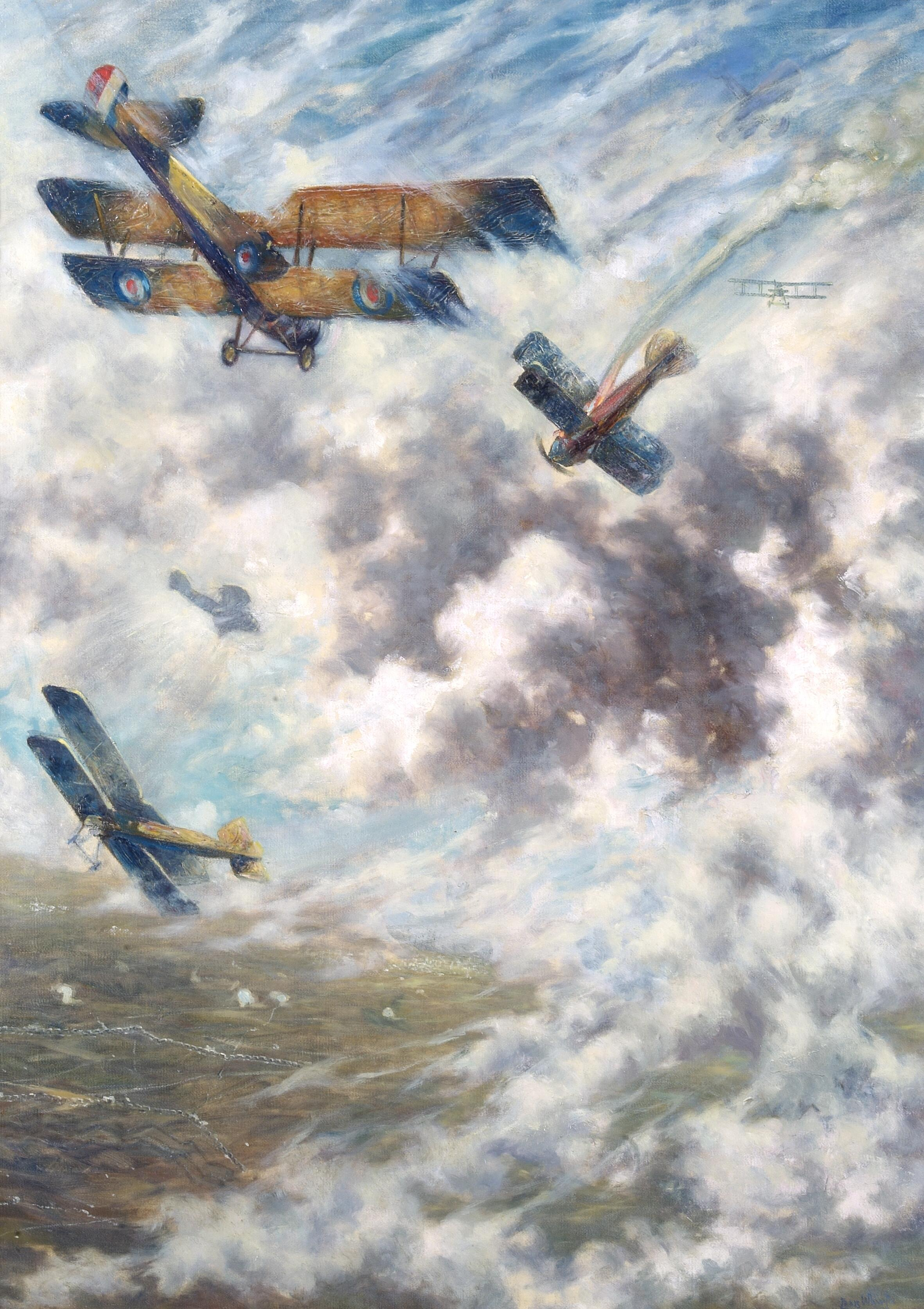
An Incident on the Western Front, view of a dogfight involving five aircraft. In the upper foreground a biplane of the Royal Flying Corps flies towards a stricken German biplane, which is falling towards the ground leaving a trail of smoke in its wake (Imperial War Museum).

Dogfighting became widespread in World War I. Aircraft were initially used as mobile observation vehicles, and early pilots gave little thought to aerial combat. The new aeroplanes proved their worth by spotting the hidden German advance on Paris in the second month of the war.

Enemy pilots at first simply exchanged waves, or shook their fists at each other. Due to weight restrictions, only small weapons could be carried on board. Intrepid pilots decided to interfere with enemy reconnaissance by improvised means, including throwing bricks, grenades and sometimes rope, which they hoped would entangle the enemy plane's propeller. Pilots soon began firing hand-held guns at enemy planes, such as pistols and carbines. The first aerial dogfight of the war occurred during the Battle of Cer (15–24 August 1914), when the Serbian aviator Miodrag Tomić encountered an Austro-Hungarian plane while performing a reconnaissance mission over Austro-Hungarian positions. The Austro-Hungarian pilot initially waved, and Tomić reciprocated. The Austro-Hungarian pilot then fired at Tomić with his revolver. Tomić managed to escape, and within several weeks, all Serbian and Austro-Hungarian planes were fitted with machine-guns. In August 1914, Staff-Captain Pyotr Nesterov, from Russia, became the first pilot to ram his plane into an enemy spotter aircraft. In October 1914, an airplane was shot down by a handgun from another plane for the first time over Reims, France. Once machine guns were mounted on the airplane, either on a flexible mounting or on the top wing of early biplanes, the era of air combat began.

The biggest problem was mounting a machine gun onto an aircraft so that it could be fired forward, through the propeller, and aimed by pointing the nose of the aircraft directly at the enemy. French aviator Roland Garros solved this problem by mounting steel deflector wedges on the propeller of a Morane Saulnier monoplane. He achieved three kills, but was forced down due to engine failure down behind enemy lines and captured before he could burn his plane to prevent it falling into enemy hands. The wreckage was brought to Anthony Fokker, a Dutch designer who built aircraft for the Germans. Fokker decided that the wedges were much too risky, and improved the design by connecting the trigger of an MG 08 Maxim machine gun to the timing of the engine. The invention of this synchronization gear in 1915 transformed air combat and gave the Germans an early air superiority with the Fokker E.I, the first synchronized, forward-firing fighter plane. On the evening of 1 July 1915, the very first aerial engagement by a fighter plane armed with a synchronized, forward-firing machine gun occurred just to the east of Luneville, France. The German Fokker E.I was flown by Lieutenant Kurt Wintgens, who shot down a French two-seat observation monoplane. Later that same month, on 25 July 1915, British Royal Flying Corps (RFC) Major Lanoe Hawker, flying a very early production Bristol Scout C., attacked three separate aircraft during a single sortie, shooting down two with a non-synchronizable Lewis gun which was mounted next to his cockpit at an outwards angle to avoid hitting the propeller. He forced the third one down, and was awarded the Victoria Cross.

Battles in the air increased as the technological advantage swung from the British to the Germans, then back again. The Feldflieger-Abteilung or "FFA", observation units of the German air service, consisted in 1914–1915 of six two-seat observation aircraft each. Each unit was assigned to a particular German Army headquarters location, and had a single Fokker Eindecker aircraft assigned to each "FFA" unit for general defensive duties, so pilots such as Max Immelmann and Oswald Boelcke began as lone hunters with FFA units, shooting unarmed spotter planes and other enemy aircraft out of the sky. During the first part of the war, there was no tactical doctrine of air-to-air combat. Oswald Boelcke was the first to analyze the tactics of aerial warfare, resulting in a set of rules known as the Dicta Boelcke. Many of Boelcke's concepts from 1916 are still applied today, including the use of sun and altitude, surprise attack, and turning to meet a threat.

Brigadier General Hugh Trenchard ordered that all British reconnaissance aircraft be supported by at least three fighters, creating the first tactical formations in the air. The Germans responded by forming Jagdstaffel or Jastas, large squadrons of fighters solely dedicated to destroying enemy aircraft, under the supervision of Boelcke. Pilots who shot down five or more fighters became known as aces. One of the most famous dogfights, resulting in the death of Major Hawker, is described by the "Red Baron", Manfred von Richthofen:

I WAS extremely proud when, one fine day, I was informed that the airman whom I had brought down on the twenty- third of November, 1916, was the English [equivalent of] Immelmann....

First we circled twenty times to the left, and then thirty times to the right. Each tried to get behind and above the other. Soon I discovered that I was not meeting a beginner. He had not the slightest intention of breaking off the fight. He was travelling in a machine which turned beautifully. However, my own was better at rising than his, and I succeeded at last in getting above and beyond my English waltzing partner.

... The impertinent fellow was full of cheek and when we had got down to about 3,000 feet he merrily waved to me as if he would say, "Well, how do you do?"

The circles which we made around one another were so narrow that their diameter was probably no more than 250 or 300 feet. I had time to take a good look at my opponent....

When he had come down to about three hundred feet he tried to escape by flying in a zig-zag course during which, as is well known, it is difficult for an observer to shoot. That was my most favorable moment. I followed him at an altitude of from two hundred and fifty feet to one hundred and fifty feet, firing all the time. The Englishman could not help falling. But the jamming of my gun nearly robbed me of my success.

My opponent fell, shot through the head, one hundred and fifty feet behind our line.

Despite the Germans' early lead in combat tactics and their 'Dicta Boelcke', the Allies were quick to adapt and develop their own tactics. The Royal Flying Corps' Albert Ball was one of a band of pilots who liked to fly solo and he developed 'stalking' tactics for going after enemy two-seaters. He even used his Lewis gun in its top-wing adjustable Foster mounting to fire upwards into the underside of unsuspecting enemy aircraft. Other RFC pilots such as James McCudden and Mick Mannock emphasised mutual support and the advantages of attacking from height. Mannock expressed this in a list of aerial combat rules that were similar to Boelcke's.

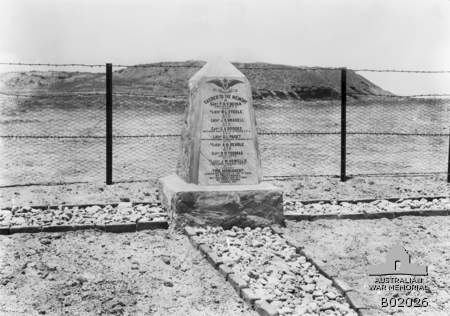
Memorial erected by German airmen in Palestine, in memory of British and Australian airmen killed in their lines during 1917

During 1916, aerial reconnaissance patrols were usually unaccompanied as there had been few if any aerial disputes between the belligerents. However, just as the Sinai and Palestine Campaign ground war on the Gaza to Beersheba line came to resemble trench warfare on the western front, the air war over southern Palestine also came to resemble that being fought over France. After the Second Battle of Gaza in April 1917 and during the ensuing Stalemate in Southern Palestine, the concentration of Egyptian Expeditionary (EEF) and Ottoman Army forces holding established front lines grew, as associated supply dumps and lines of communications were developed. The need for information about these installations fuelled "intense rivalry in the air". Aerial reconnaissance patrols were regularly attacked, so all photography and artillery observation patrols had to be accompanied by armed escort aircraft. These special EEF patrols grew into squadrons, attacking hostile aircraft wherever they were found, either in the air or on the ground. However, the technically superior German aircraft shot down numbers of EEF aircraft during dog fights.

By the end of the war, the underpowered machines from just ten years prior had been transformed into fairly powerful, swift, and heavily armed fighter planes, and the basic tactics of dogfighting had been established.

=== Spanish Civil War ===
Airplane technology rapidly increased in sophistication after World War I. By 1936, dogfighting was thought to be a thing of the past, since aircraft were reaching top speeds of over 400 km/h (250 miles per hour). The experiences of the Spanish Civil War proved this theory was wrong.

At the beginning of the war, new tactics were developed, most notably in the Luftwaffe Condor Legion. Lieutenant Werner Mölders advised abandoning the standard "V" formation used in combat, and pairing fighters in twos, starting the practice of having a wingman at one's side. He advised that pairs of aircraft approaching a fight should increase the distance between them instead of holding tight formations, a precursor to the combat spread maneuver. He also started the practice of training pilots to fly at night, and with instruments only. Using the new tactics, and flying the newest Bf 109 fighters, the Germans shot down 22 Spanish Republican fighters within a five-day period, suffering no losses of their own.

=== World War II ===
==== Strategies for fighter development ====
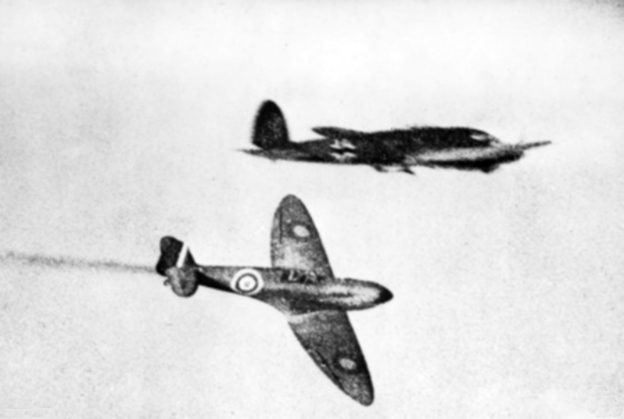
A Royal Air Force Supermarine Spitfire pursuing a Luftwaffe Heinkel He 111 during the Battle of Britain

During the 1930s two different schools of thought about air-to-air combat began to emerge, resulting in two different trends of monoplane fighter development. In Japan and Italy especially, there continued to be a strong belief that lightly armed, highly maneuverable single seat fighters would still play a primary role in air-to-air combat. Aircraft such as the Nakajima Ki-27 and Nakajima Ki-43 and the Mitsubishi A6M Zero in Japan, and the Fiat G.50 and Macchi C.200 in Italy epitomised a generation of monoplanes designed to this concept.

The other stream of thought, which emerged primarily in Britain, Germany, the Soviet Union, and the United States was the belief the high speeds of modern combat aircraft and the g-forces imposed by aerial combat meant that dogfighting in the classic WWI sense would be impossible. Fighters such as the Messerschmitt Bf 109, the Supermarine Spitfire, the Yakovlev Yak-1, and the Curtiss P-40 were all designed for high speeds and a good rate of climb. Good maneuverability was not a primary objective.

Immediately following the Spanish Civil War came World War II, during which dogfighting was most prevalent. It was widely believed that strategic bombing alone was synonymous with air power; a fallacy that would not be fully understood until the Vietnam War. After the failings in Spain, a greater emphasis was placed on the accuracy of air-to-ground attacks. The need to stop bombers from reaching their targets, or to protect them on their missions, was the primary purpose for most dogfights of the era.

==== Dogfighting over Europe ====
United States Army Air Force P-51 Mustang gun-camera displaying engagements against various German Luftwaffe fighter-aircraft over Europe, 1944

Dogfighting was very prominent in the European theatre. While the French Air Force was a major force during World War I, it was inadequate and poorly organized, and quickly fell to the German onslaught. As the first battles between the Germans and the British began, the power of the German's anti-aircraft artillery became readily apparent, with 88 millimeter shells capable of firing 12,000 m (40,000 feet) in the air. General Wolfram von Richthofen noted that these guns were equally destructive when used for ground fire. Adolph Malan compiled a list of aerial combat rules that were widely taught to RAF pilots. The Bf 109 and the Spitfire were some of the most common fighters used in the European theater.

A typical dogfight is described by an unnamed pilot:

Pulling up into his blind spot I watched his plane grow larger and larger in my sight. But this German pilot was not content to fly straight and level. Before I could open fire his plane slewed to the right, and seeing me on his tail, he jerked back on the stick into the only defensive maneuver his plane could make. I banked my 47 over to the right and pulled back on the stick, striving to get him once more into my ring sight. The violent maneuver applied terrific G's to my body, and I started to black out as the blood rushed from my head. Fighting every second to overcome this blackness about me, I pulled back on the stick, further and further, so that the enemy would just show at the bottom of my ring sight to allow for the correct deflection. We were both flying in a tight circle. Just a little more and I'll have him. Pressing the [trigger] I waited expectantly for the 109 to explode. I've hit his wing. A section two-feet long broke loose from the right wing as the machine gun cut like a machete through it. Too low, a little more rudder and the bullets will find his cockpit. I could see occasional strikes further up the wing, but it was too late. The 109, sensing that I was inside him on the turn, slunk into a nearby cloud. Straightening my plane, I climbed over the top of the bank, and poised on the other side, waiting for him to appear. But the 109 did not appear, and not wishing to tempt the gods of fate further, I pushed my stick forward, entered the protective cover of the clouds, and headed home.

==== Soviet fighters ====
During this time, three new Soviet fighters, the LaGG-1, the Yak-1, and the MiG-3 were just coming off of the production line. The Soviet Air Defense Force had been fraught with problems since World War I. The German Barbarossa offensive on 22 June 1941 destroyed more than 2,000 Soviet aircraft on the first day, and more than 5,000 before October. With great desperation, the Soviets fought in dogfights over Leningrad, Moscow, and Ukraine for more than a year.

Fireteam, a triple of aircraft ("troika"), has been the main tactical unit used in battles since the beginning of World War II. The analysis and synthesis of fighting experience resulted in a conclusion that group tactics should have been rejected and replaced by action pairs. However, ramming an opponent was still a common practice among the pilots of the Soviet Union. Another successful maneuver was a "sokolinnyi udar" (falcon punch) when a pilot obtained a speed advantage by swooping down on an opponent, characteristically from the direction of the sun in order to hide their fighter within the glare of the brilliant light before and during the attack. This maneuver and many other tactical principles were introduced by Alexander Pokryshkin, one of the greatest tacticians of the Soviet Air Forces who showed his worth during World War II. His famous motto sounded as "Height, speed, maneuver, fire!". It became popular in the air armies and was adopted by pilots.

Struggling with morale problems, the Soviets slowly and methodically began to regain air supremacy after the Battle of Stalingrad in 1943. This theater is notable for including the earliest female fighter aces in history, Yekaterina Budanova and Lydia Litvyak.

==== Second Sino-Japanese War ====
The Second Sino-Japanese War began on 7 July 1937, between China and Japan. The Japanese used the Mitsubishi A5M; the predecessor of the famous "Zero", which was a very lightweight and maneuverable fighter. The Chinese mainly used Russian biplanes similar to those from WWI, such as the Polikarpov I-15 and early monoplanes such as I-16. Despite being much lower in power and speed than the Japanese planes, the Chinese planes were much more maneuverable, and many dogfights ensued, resulting in high losses reported on both sides. Reports of dogfights that made it to the U.S. military provided valuable insight into the Japanese tactics and their plane's flight characteristics.

==== United States and Japan ====
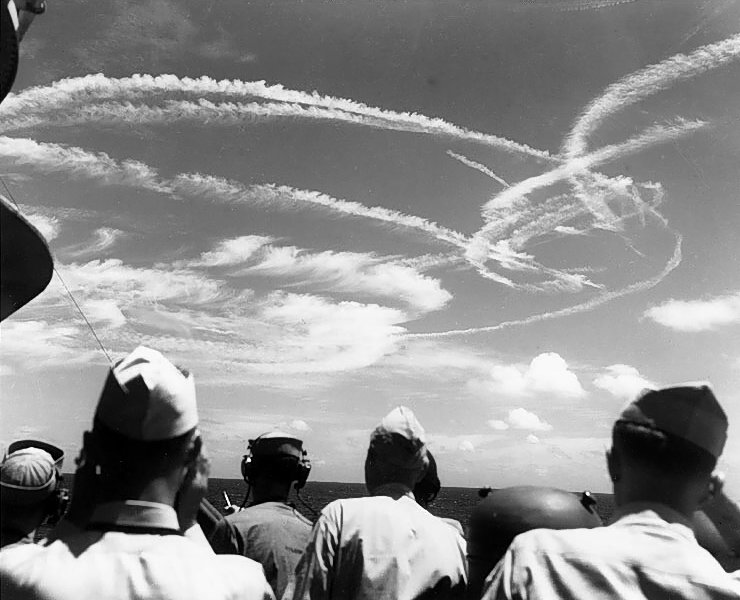
Contrails from dogfights between American and Japanese aircraft during the 1944 Battle of the Philippine Sea

After the bombing of Pearl Harbor, the United States entered the war. The Japanese used, among other aircraft, the Mitsubishi A6M Zero, an extremely lightweight fighter known for its exceptional range and maneuverability. The U.S. military tested the Akutan Zero, a Mitsubishi A6M2 which was captured intact in 1942, advising – along the same lines that General Claire Chennault, commander of the Kunming-based Flying Tigers had already advised his pilots over a year before – "Never attempt to dogfight a Zero." Even though its engine was rather low in power, the Zero had very low wing loading characteristics, a small turn radius, a top speed over 330 mph (530 km/h), and could climb better than any fighter used by the U.S. at that time, although it was poorly armored compared to U.S. aircraft.

A pilot who realized that new tactics had to be devised was Lieutenant Commander John S. "Jimmy" Thach, commander of Fighting Three in San Diego. He read the early reports coming out of China and wrestled with the problem of his F4F Wildcats being relatively slower and much less maneuverable than the Japanese planes. Using matchsticks on his kitchen table, he devised a defensive maneuver he called "beam defense position", but commonly called the "Thach Weave". Thach reasoned that, because the Zero had fabric wing-covers that tended to "balloon" at speeds above 295 mph (474.7 km/h) which made the plane very hard to turn, he could use high speed and a formation of four planes, consisting of two pairs of aircraft, flying line-abreast (side by side at the same altitude). Keeping the leader of each pair in close formation with their wingman, the pairs could fly about 200 feet (61 m) apart (the turn radius of the Wildcat) and adopt a weaving formation when either or both pairs fell under attack by Japanese fighters, allowing each pair to evade the attack while at the same time covering the other pair. Thach made a diagram of the idea and showed it to other pilots, but in trial-runs people like Butch O'Hare found it difficult to make the shot while, at the same time, evading the two friendly planes coming at him head on.

Thach later faced the A6M Zero during the Battle of Midway, in June 1942, for the test of his theory. Although outnumbered, he found that a Zero would lock onto the tail of one of the fighters. In response, the two planes would turn toward each other, with one plane's path crossing in front of the other. More importantly, the pursuer would have to follow that path to maintain pursuit, also crossing in front of the American plane's sights. Thus, when the Zero followed its original target through the turn it would come into a position to be fired on by the target's wingman, and the predator would become the prey. His tactic proved to be effective and was soon adopted by other squadrons. The Thach Weave helped make up for the inferiority of the US planes in maneuverability and numbers, until new aircraft could be brought into service. This tactic later morphed into the more fluid and versatile "loose-deuce maneuvering" that was to prove useful in the Vietnam War.

Another effective maneuver used by the U.S. pilots was a simple break, which consisted of turning sharply across an attacker's flight path, which worked well in part because the large nose of the Zero tended to obstruct the pilot's view. Still another good tactic was a high-side guns pass, which consisted of diving upon the Zero, shooting in one high-speed pass, and using the speed to climb back above the fight to dive again. By 1943 the U.S. began to produce planes that were better matched against the Japanese planes, such as the Grumman F6F Hellcat, and the Vought F4U Corsair.

==== Technology ====
Technology advanced extremely fast during World War II in ways that would change dogfighting forever. Jet propulsion had been demonstrated long before the war, by German engineer Hans von Ohain in 1934, and by British engineer Frank Whittle in 1937. The Messerschmitt Me 262 was the first jet fighter to be used in battle, with a speed over 800 km/h (500 mph), and began taking a toll on Allied bombing missions in 1944. The British were testing a jet that same year, the Gloster Meteor, which would later see action in the Korean War. Although U.S. General Hap Arnold test flew the XP-59A in 1942, the plane was never used in combat. Other prime inventions of the era include radar and air-to-air missiles.

==== Propaganda ====
Enemy pilots were construed as weak and evil. For example, in World War II, describing the Soviet tactics, the Luftwaffe claimed that, "The characteristic feature of the average Soviet fighter pilot were a tendency toward caution and reluctance instead of toughness and stamina, brute strength instead of genuine combat efficiency, abysmal hatred instead of fairness and chivalry...."

=== Korean War ===
Rare Korean War F-86 gun camera footage of a MiG-15 shoot-down over Korea

After World War II, the question began to rise about the future usefulness of fighter aircraft. This was especially true for the U.S., where the focus was placed on small, fast, long-range bombers capable of delivering atomic bombs. The Korean War began in June 1950, and the North Koreans were outmatched by the U.S. Air Force. The war was nearly over by October, with the occupation of North Korea when, on November 1, Chinese MiG-15s attacked. The Chinese began supplying North Korea with troops and provisions, and the war quickly resumed.

At 160 km/h (100 mph) faster, the MiG-15 was more than a match for the U.S. P-80 Shooting Star, using the same dive and shoot tactic that the Americans found so useful against Japan. The U.S. jets had inferior weaponry, and suffered from problems with production and parts. The U.S. resorted to using mainly the more maneuverable propeller driven fighters during the war, such as the P-51 Mustang which was carried over from World War II.

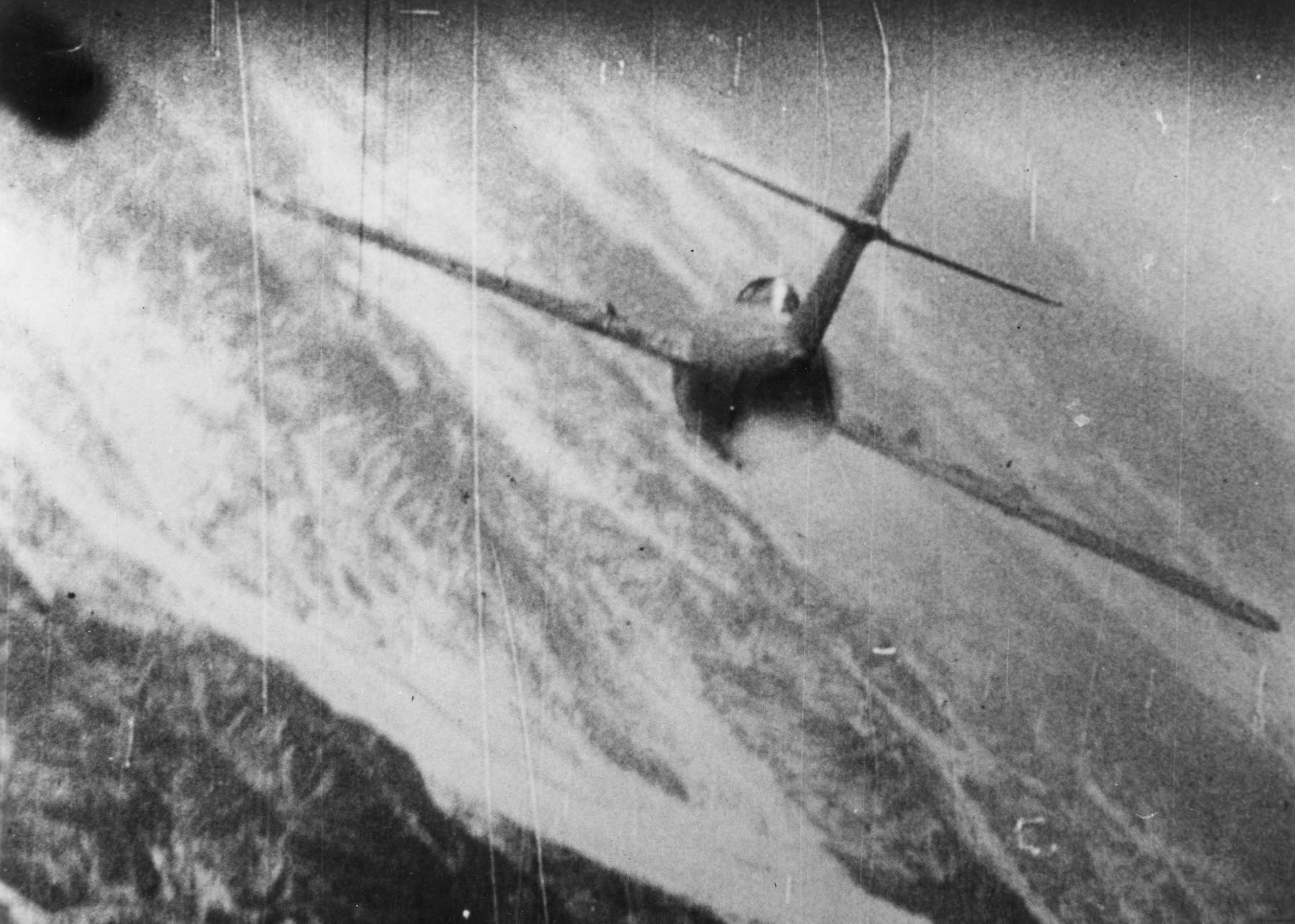
A MiG-15 being attacked by a U.S. Air Force F-86 Sabre piloted by American ace pilot Manuel J. Fernandez during the Korean War, either 1952 or 1953

To combat the MiGs, the F-86 Sabre was put into production. The U.S. pilots had a number of major advantages over the Chinese, including the G-suit. Chinese fighters were often seen spinning off out of control during a hard turn because the pilot had lost consciousness. Other technological advantages included the radar-ranging gunsight and hydraulic controls. Colonel Harrison R. Thyng remarked:

Suddenly you go into a steep turn. Your mach drops off. The MiG turns with you, and you let him gradually creep up and outturn you. At the critical moment you reverse your turn. The hydraulic controls [of the F-86] work beautifully. The MiG cannot turn as readily as you and is slung out to the side. When you pop your speedbrakes, the MiG flashes by you. Quickly closing the brakes, you slide onto his tail and hammer him with your "50s".

The Chinese were very competent in a dogfight, and large swirling battles were fought in the skies over Korea. However, it was highly suspected by many U.S. pilots that some of the opponents they faced over Korea were in fact well-trained Soviet pilots, whom the Americans referred to as "hanchos", (a Japanese word, meaning "bosses"). Major Robinson Risner recalls,

Seeing one another about the same time, the MiG flight and my flight dropped [our extra fuel] tanks.. He was so low he was throwing up small rocks. I dropped down to get him, but to hit him I had to get down in his jet wash. He'd chop the throttle and throw out his speed brakes. I would coast up beside him, wingtip to wingtip. When it looked like I was going to overshoot him, I would roll over the top and come down on the other side of him. When I did, he'd go into a hard turn, pulling all the Gs he could. This guy was one fantastic pilot.

The war in the air, however, eventually came to a stalemate as fighting ceased between the two factions. Later after the fall of the Soviet Union, Soviet records showed that Russian pilots were indeed in the air. Sometimes in the fury of combat they reverted to the Russian language over the radio.

=== Vietnam War ===
Gun-camera recorded missile-kill from F-4 Phantom II piloted by Captains Steve Ritchie & Jeff Feinstein during the Vietnam War

The Vietnam War "was the first 'modern' air war" in which air-to-air missiles were the primary weapons during aerial combat, and was the only confrontation between the latest aerial and ground defense technologies between the Soviet Union and the United States. If U.S. air power could successfully conduct war against Soviet doctrine and equipment in the skies over North Vietnam, then it could expect to successfully operate against the Soviet Union during a massive war in Europe.Over the skies of North Vietnam, U.S. aircraft would be attacking the "most formidable and most heavily defended targets in the history of aerial warfare".

By this time, dogfighting techniques had fallen out of favor in U.S. training doctrines, as missiles were considered to be all that was necessary to shoot down the big bombers expected to be deployed by the Soviet Union. As a result, air combat methods known by fighter pilots since World War I became all but lost as veterans from WWII and Korea retired and didn't pass them on to succeeding generations. American fighter pilots would meet in the skies in secret to engage in mock combat to try to maintain some level of proficiency. It wasn't until TOPGUN was established for the Navy in 1969 and Red Flag was started for the Air Force in 1975 that pilots were formally trained in dogfighting again.

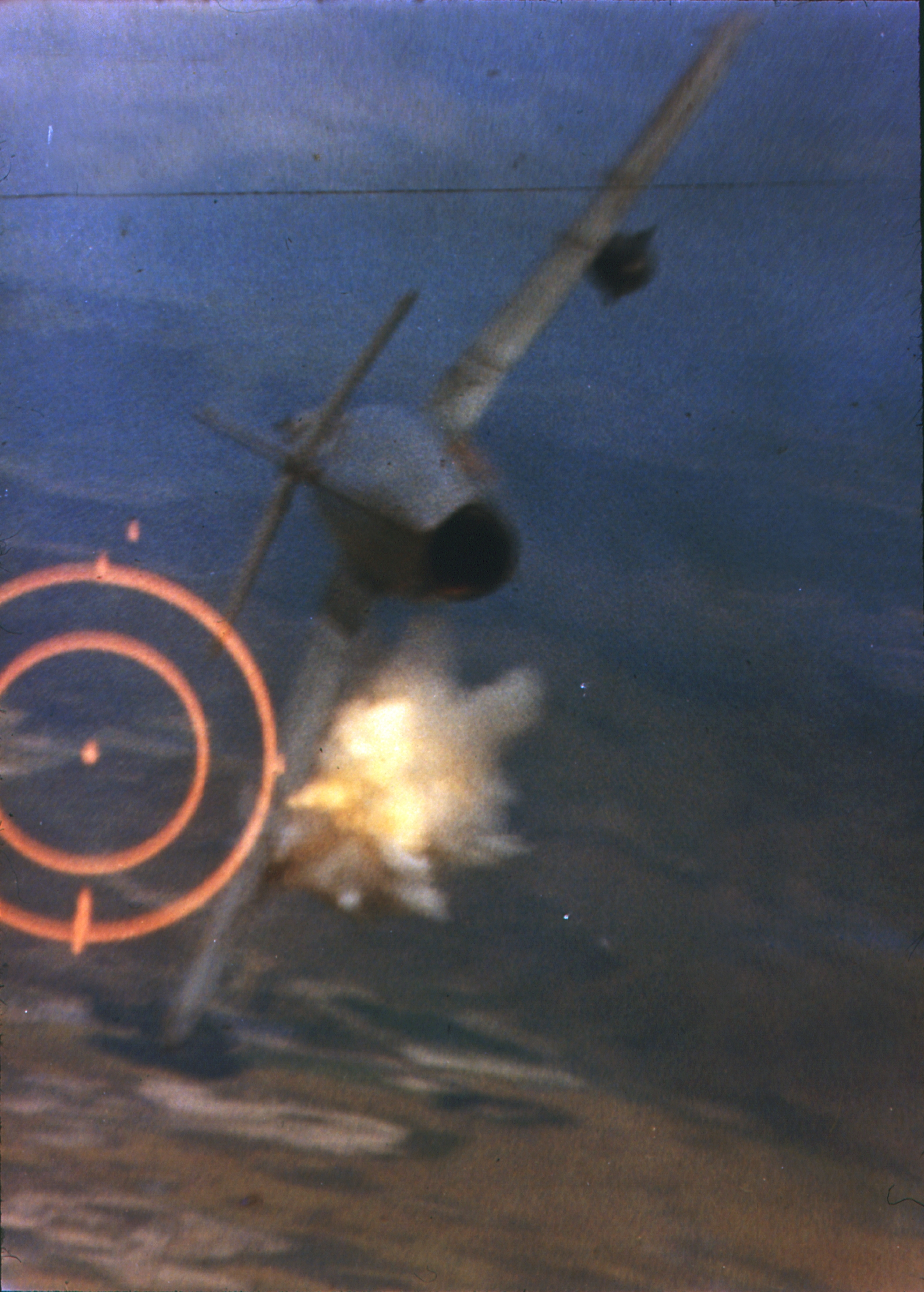
A U.S. Air Force F-105D shooting down a Vietnam People's Air Force MiG-17 during the Vietnam War, June 1967

Both U.S. and Soviet-built jet "fighters" were primarily designed as interceptors: intercepting bomber groups, and then shooting them down with air-to-air missiles. Neither party had a separate designation for interceptor, though: just "F" for fighter; "A" for attack; and "B" for bomber (for the NATO aircraft). With possibly a few exceptions, such as the F-8 Crusader and the F-100 Super Sabre, which each mounted four 20 mm cannons, jets were not designed for dog fighting other jet aircraft. Soviet doctrine called for their interceptors to be strictly vectored towards their targets by Ground Control Intercept (GCI) operators. As a consequence, U.S. RF-101 Voodoo aircraft conducting reconnaissance missions, or F-102 Delta Daggers, F-104 Starfighters performing MiGCAP duties, and the strike aircraft themselves, such as F-105 Thunderchiefs, A-4 Skyhawks, A-6 Intruders, F-4 Phantoms and B-52's flying over North Vietnam were met by MiG-17s (or Chicom J-5s), MiG-19s (Chicom J-6s), and MiG-21s being vectored directly to them by GCI operators who worked in conjunction with surface-to-air missile (SAM) crews. U.S. aircraft which successfully made it through the NVAF MiGs were then confronted with the SAMs and AAA batteries.

This triad defense system of GCI-controlled MiGs, missiles (SAMs), and AAA enabled the North Vietnamese MiGs to utilize their aircraft's design capabilities as their designers had intended, that of, in the vernacular of the time, making "one pass, and then hauling ass", which was, in practice, quickly firing at their targets and then speeding away. By 1967 the Soviets had supplied the NVAF with enough missile-firing MiG-21s to allow the North Vietnamese to routinely engage U.S. aircraft, and to rely less and less on their aged MiG-17s, although many North Vietnamese pilots still preferred the MiG-17s agility and easy maintenance. With the arrival of the additional MiG-21s, and by 1969 MiG-19s (J-6s) imported from China, engagements between U.S. and NVAF jets became generally divided into two arenas; MiG-21s engaged at higher altitudes, while MiG-17s and MiG-19s would try to give battle at lower altitudes where their cannons were more effective.

F-4 Air Combat Tactics (1968) De-classified official USAF aerial combat engagement pilot training film reel

At the conclusion of the air war in 1973, U.S. airmen had downed 202 communist MiGs, including two downed by B-52 tail gunners from their quad .50 caliber machine guns; this at a cost of 90 U.S. aircraft to NVAF MiGs. The USAF claimed 137 MiGs while the USN/USMC brought down 65 in air-to-air combat. From these figures, the USAF had 40 gun kills, and the USN claimed eight cannon victories. This number approached parity with the NVAF MiG's 37 gun kill figures.

Approximately 612 radar-guided AIM-7 Sparrow missiles were fired during the war, scoring 56 MiG kills, while 454 heat-seeking AIM-9 Sidewinders were launched achieving 81 aerial victories. During Operation Rolling Thunder 54 AIM-4 Falcon missiles were fired, obtaining five kills. By contrast, NVAF MiG-21s obtained 53 air-to-air kills with their AA-2 "Atoll" missiles, from an unknown number of launchings. At least three MiG-21s, and all of the MiG-17s and MiG-19s (J-6s) made the remaining 37 kills, from their 90 total, with their 23 mm, 30 mm and 37 mm cannons.>

As part of the North Vietnamese triad system of defense, surface-to-air missiles (SAMs) had become an ever-increasing threat. U.S Air Force Brigadier General Robin Olds describes a typical encounter with surface-to-air missiles, which during a period of time in Vietnam was referred to as either a "MiG day" or a "Sam day", this was a Sam day.

Here come the SAMs. The trick is seeing the launch. You can see the steam. It goes straight up, turns more level, then the booster drops off. If it maintains a relatively stable position, it's coming right for you and you're in trouble. You're eager to make a move but can't. If you dodge too fast it will turn and catch you; if you wait too late it will explode near enough to get you. What you do at the right moment is poke your nose down, go down as hard as you can, pull maybe three negative Gs at 550 knots and once it follows you down, you go up as hard as you can. It can't follow that and goes under.

This passage from a USAF booklet explained a MiG day:

If you know a MiG-21 is in your area or you lose sight of one and want to find it again: Roll out wings level for 15 seconds, then look in your 6 o'clock about 1.5 miles. It will be there. Probably you'll see Mach 2 Atoll (air-to-air missile) smoke trail first before you see the MiG. But remember that's where the MiG-21 is! Just ask one of the 20 aircrews shot down during Linebacker that never knew they were under attack.

=== Arab–Israeli Wars ===
Dogfighting occurred in every war between Israel and her Arab neighbors between 1948 and 1985, including the 1948 Palestine war, the Sinai War in 1956, the Six-Day War in 1967, the War of Attrition, the Yom Kippur War in 1973, and the 1982 Lebanon War.

Initially both sides relied on propeller planes, such as Spitfires, Avia S-199s, and P-51s, then progressed to older jets like MiG-15s, Dassault Mysteres and Dassault Mirages. In the latter wars dogfighting ensued between modern aircraft, like F-15s and F-16s against MiG-21s and MiG-25s. Although often outnumbered, the IAF was dominant in every conflict and in 1967 defeated the combined air forces of Egypt, Jordan and Syria. In dogfights the IAF often achieved kill ratios ranging from 10:1 to over 20:1, which is usually attributed to the superior training of Israeli pilots rather than technological advantage.

=== Indo-Pakistani War of 1965 ===
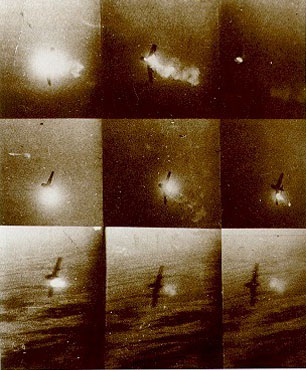
A Pakistan Air Force F-86 Sabre being shot down in combat by an Indian Air Force Folland Gnat, September 1965

The Indo-Pakistani War of 1965 saw the Indian and Pakistani Air Forces engaged in large-scale aerial combat against each other for the first time since the independence of Pakistan in 1947. The war took place during the course of September 1965 and saw both air forces conduct defensive and offensive operations over Indian and Pakistani airspace. The aerial war saw both sides conducting thousands of sorties in a single month. Both sides claimed victory in the air war; India claimed to have destroyed 73 enemy aircraft and lost 35 of its own while Pakistan claimed to have destroyed 104 aircraft against its own losses of 19. Despite the intense fighting, India was able to shoot down around 18 PAF jets while losing 14 jets. Neutral sources mention India losing 75 and Pakistan lost 20 jets. In the first stage of War, 4 Indian Vampire Fighters were shot down by PAF F-86s on 1 September, while from Indian side, Indian Sqn. Ldr. Trevor Keeler with his Gnat took the first hit on 3 September 1965 by downing a Pakistani F-86 which got crashed in an uncontrollable dive. IAF Flt. Lt.V S Pathania took the first kill by his Gnat on 4 September 1965 by downing the Pakistani F-86 of Flt. Lt Bhatt who escaped to safe territory by parachute. PAF Sqn. Ldr. Muhammad Mahmood Alam, became highest flying ace by 5 confirmed and 4 probable kills. PAF Sqn. Ldr. Sarfraz Rafiqui who shot down 3 and Flt. Lt. Yunus were shot down in Halwara, Indian air base by fresh pilots with IAF Hawker Hunter Mk. 56. One Indian Gnat landed in a Pakistani airbase accidentally due to being low on fuel and disoriented, now exhibited as a war trophy in the Pakistan Air Force Museum. After the war, PAF's loss rate was 17 percent of its front line strength, while India's losses amounted to less than 10 per cent.

=== Indo-Pakistani War of 1971 ===
By late 1971, the intensification of the independence movement in erstwhile East Pakistan led to the Bangladesh Liberation War between India and Pakistan. On 22 November 1971, 10 days before the start of a full-scale war, four PAF F-86 Sabre jets attacked Indian and Mukti Bahini positions at Garibpur, near the international border. Two of the four PAF Sabres were shot down and one damaged by the IAF's Folland Gnats. On 3 December, India formally declared war against Pakistan following massive preemptive strikes by the PAF against Indian Air Force installations in Srinagar, Ambala, Sirsa, Halwara and Jodhpur. However, the IAF did not suffer significantly because the leadership had anticipated such a move and precautions were taken. The Indian Air Force was quick to respond to Pakistani air strikes, following which the PAF carried out mostly defensive sorties.

Within the first two weeks, the IAF had carried out almost 12,000 sorties over East Pakistan and also provided close air support to the advancing Indian Army. The IAF also assisted the Indian Navy in its operations against the Pakistani Navy in the Bay of Bengal and Arabian Sea. On the western front, the IAF destroyed more than 20 Pakistani tanks, four APCs and a supply train during the Battle of Longewala. The IAF undertook strategic bombing of West Pakistan by carrying out raids on oil installations in Karachi, the Mangla Dam and a gas plant in Sindh. A similar strategy was also deployed in East Pakistan, and, as the IAF achieved complete air superiority on the eastern front, the ordnance factories, runways, and other vital areas of East Pakistan were severely damaged. By the time the Pakistani forces surrendered, the IAF had destroyed 94 PAF aircraft. The IAF was able to conduct a wide range of missions – troop support; air combat; deep penetration strikes; para-dropping behind enemy lines; feints to draw enemy fighters away from the actual target; bombing; and reconnaissance. In contrast, the Pakistan Air Force, which was solely focused on air combat, was blown out of the subcontinent's skies within the first week of the war. Those PAF aircraft that survived took refuge at Iranian air bases or in concrete bunkers, refusing to offer a fight. Hostilities officially ended at 14:30 GMT on 17 December, after the fall of Dacca on 15 December. India claimed large gains of territory in West Pakistan (although pre-war boundaries were recognised after the war), and the independence of Pakistan's East wing as Bangladesh was confirmed. The IAF had flown over 16,000 sorties on both East and West fronts; including sorties by transport aircraft and helicopters. while the PAF flew about 30 and 2,840. More than 80 percent of the IAF's sorties were close-support and interdiction, and according to neutral assessments about 45 IAF aircraft were lost while, Pakistan lost 75 aircraft. Not including any F-6s, Mirage IIIs, or the six Jordanian F-104s which failed to return to their donors. But the imbalance in air losses was explained by the IAF's considerably higher sortie rate, and its emphasis on ground-attack missions. On the ground Pakistan suffered most, with 9,000 killed and 25,000 wounded while India had 3,000 dead and 12,000 wounded. The loss of armoured vehicles was similarly imbalanced. This represented a major defeat for Pakistan. Towards the end of the war, IAF's transport planes dropped leaflets over Dhaka urging the Pakistani forces to surrender, demoralising Pakistani troops in East Pakistan.

=== Gulf of Sidra incidents ===
On 19 August 1981, two Grumman F-14 Tomcats of the VF-41 Black Aces engaged two Libyan Air Force Sukhoi Su-22 Fitters over the Gulf of Sidra. One Su-22 opened fire on the F-14 but missed. The F-14s destroyed the Su-22 Fitters using AIM-9 Sidewinder missiles; both pilots of the destroyed Su-22 planes ejected.

Eight years later, on 4 January 1989, a similar engagement occurred between two F-14s of the VF-32 Fighting Swordsmen and MiG-23 Floggers. The F-14s downed the MiGs with AIM-7 Sparrow and AIM-9 Sidewinder missiles after the MiGs made aggressive maneuvers against the F-14s.

=== Falklands War ===
The Falklands War began on 2 April 1982, when Argentina invaded the Falkland Islands, and then the island of South Georgia and the South Sandwich Islands, which were small disputed dependencies. Because the United Kingdom had no military bases nearby and few aircraft carriers, the Argentinians did not expect a response from the UK. On 5 April, the British sent carriers to the Falklands with Sea Harrier 'Jump-jets' on board. The Harrier was originally designed as a ground-attack plane, and was not equipped for dogfighting, so the aircraft had to undergo many modifications and the pilots given extra training.

The Argentinians had superior numbers, but their forces mainly consisted of older jets from the 1960s, such as Dassault Mirage IIIs and Israeli Daggers. The Argentinians were also handicapped by the long distance from mainland airfields and a lack of refueling tankers. Neither side was ready for war, but both prepared all through April as diplomacy failed. The fighting started on 1 May, and was to become the largest naval and air conflict since World War II. By the end of the war, Argentina lost 20 fighters in dogfights, while the UK lost two Sea Harriers to ground fire. The Americans supplied late model Sidewinder missiles to the British; this and the analysis of French Mirage combat tactics made the difference. As of March 2019 David Morgan was the last British pilot to have fought a dogfight when he downed two Argentinian jets on 8 June 1982.

=== Iran–Iraq War and helicopter dogfight ===
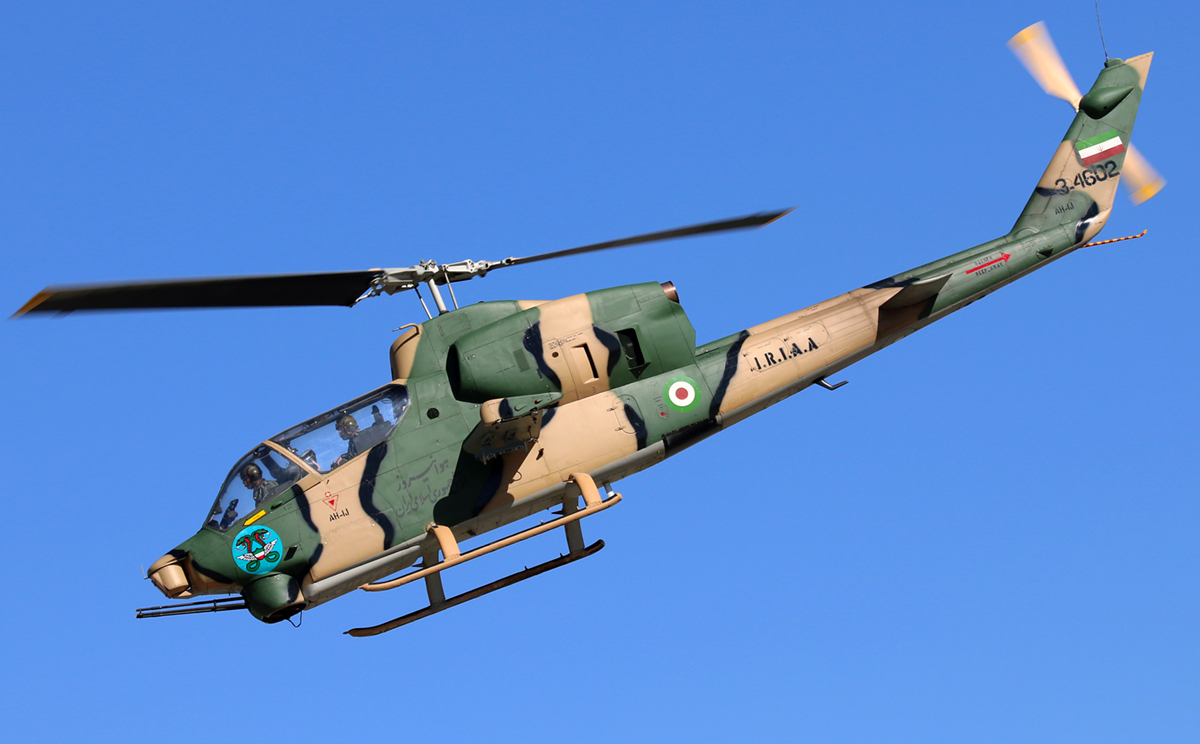
The Iran-Iraq war saw the first documented helicopter to helicopter dogfight between Iran's AH-1J Cobra versus Iraqi Mil Mi-24 Hind (pictured below).

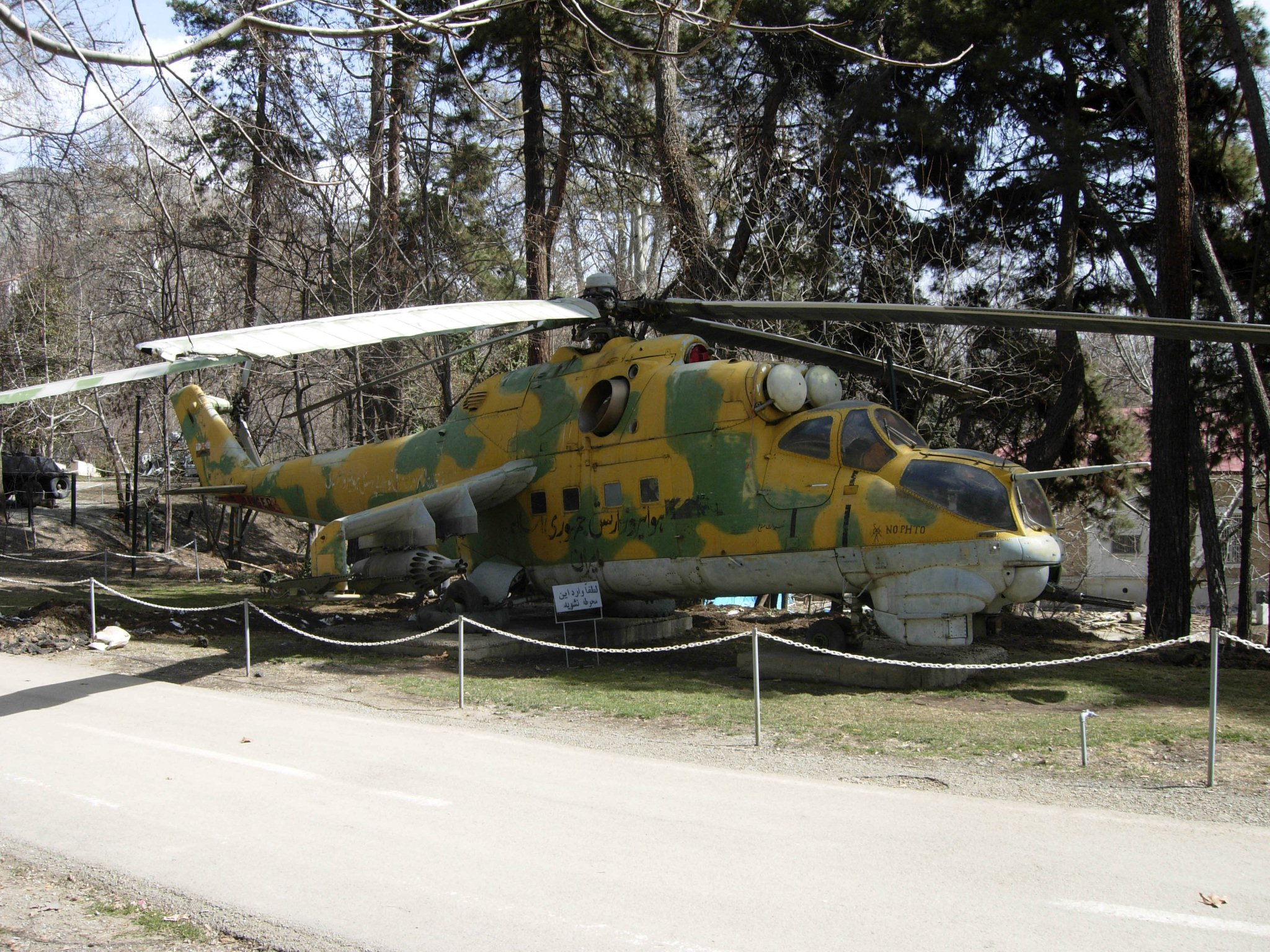
Captured Iraqi Mil Mi-24 Hind on display in Tehran, Iran

In the Iran–Iraq War of 1980–1988, many dogfights occurred between the Iranian Air Force (IRIAF) and Iraqi Air Force. During the early years of the war, the IRIAF enjoyed air superiority (see for example Operation Sultan 10 and Operation Morvarid); however, by the end of the war and partly due to embargoes, the Iranian Air Force had lost its superiority due to their increasingly outdated equipment and the lack of spare parts for their US-made aircraft. Iraq, meanwhile, continued to introduce new French and Soviet weapons into its air force.

The Iran–Iraq War also saw the world's only confirmed helicopter dogfights, with Iranian Army Aviation's AH-1J Internationals (usually the TOW-capable ones) entering combat mostly against Iraqi Army Air Corps' Mil Mi-24 Hind gunships and HOT-armed Aérospatiale Gazelles. The Hinds proved faster and more robust, while the AH-1Js were more agile. The results of the skirmishes are disputed. There were also engagements between Iranian AH-1Js and Iraqi fixed-wing aircraft: using their 20 mm cannon, the AH-1Js scored three confirmed kills against MiG-21s, claimed an Su-20, and shared in the destruction of a MiG-23.

=== Persian Gulf War ===
In the Gulf War of 1990–91, dogfighting once again proved its usefulness when the Coalition Air Force had to face off against the Iraqi Air Force, which at the time was the fifth largest in the world. By the second day of the war, the Coalition achieved air superiority. Many dogfights occurred during the short conflict, often involving many planes. By the end of January, 1991, the term "furball" became a popular word to describe the hectic situation of many dogfights, occurring at the same time within the same relatively small airspace. By the end of the war, the U.S. claimed 39 Iraqi aircraft in air-to-air victories to the loss of only one F/A-18. Of the 39 victories, 36 were taken by F-15 Eagles.

=== Balkans conflict ===
During the Balkans conflict, in 1999 (the Kosovo War), six MiG-29s of the Yugoslav Air Force were shot down in dogfights with NATO aircraft. The first was on 24 March by a Dutch F-16AM Falcon, and two were downed on the same night by U.S. F-15s. Two days later, two more MiG-29s were shot down by an F-15. The last MiG was shot down on 4 May by a U.S. F-16.

=== Eritrean–Ethiopian War (1998–2000) ===
The war became the first to see 4th-generation jet fighters battle with each other. Most of the losses to Eritrean MiG-29s were caused by dogfights with Ethiopian Su-27s.

=== 2019 Indo-Pakistan aerial skirmish ===
A dogfight between Indian and Pakistani jets took place on 27 February 2019, when Pakistani Dassault Mirage Vs, Dassault Mirage IIIs and JF-17 Thunders performed airstrikes near Indian military installations at Indian Administered Kashmir in retaliation to the Balakot Airstrike, which was carried out by the IAF on 26 February 2019.

During the dogfight, an Indian MiG-21 Bison was shot down by a Pakistani F-16 after it had shot down a Pakistani F-16 across the Line of Control. Pakistan also claimed that an Indian Su-30MKI was shot down, but this claim was later disproved when the same Su-30MKI was flown during India’s Air Force Day celebrations in October 2019.

=== 2026 Iran war ===
On 3 March 2026 Israeli F-35I Adir shot down an Iranian Yak-130 over Tehran in the first war dogfight. This marked the first time an F-35 had downed a manned aircraft in combat.

== See also ==
- Aerobatic maneuver
- Battle of Britain
- John Boyd (military strategist)
- Erich Hartmann
- Ghost of Kyiv
- Immelmann turn
- J-CATCH
- List of aircraft shootdowns
- Lufbery circle
- Post–World War II air-to-air combat losses
- Split S
- The Scissors
- Whifferdill turn

== Explanatory footnotes ==
1. Su-37 Flanker Report from Farnborough '96

== General and cited references ==
- Cutlack, F. M. (1941). The Australian Flying Corps in the Western and Eastern Theatres of War, 1914–1918. Official History of Australia in the War of 1914–1918. Vol. VIII (11th ed.). Canberra: Australian War Memorial. Archived from the original on 9 October 2012.
- Hallion, Richard P. (1992). Storm Over Iraq: Air Power and the Gulf War. Smithsonian Institution Press. pp. 1–10.
- Hobson, Chris (2001). Vietnam Air Losses: United States Air Force, Navy and Marine Corps Fixed-Wing Aircraft Losses in Southeast Asia 1961–1973. Midland Publishing. ISBN 1-85780-115-6.
- McCarthy, Donald J. (2009). MiG Killers: A Chronology of U.S. Air Victories in Vietnam 1965–1973. Specialty Press. ISBN 978-1-58007-136-9.
- Michel, Marshall L., III (1997). Clashes: Aircombat Over North Vietnam 1965–1973. Naval Institute Press. ISBN 978-1-59114-519-6.
- Shaw, Robert L. (1985). Fighter Combat: Tactics and Maneuvering. Annapolis, MD: Naval Institute Press. ISBN 0-87021-059-9.
