= Tailslide =

Aerobatic maneuver

Aresti symbol for a tailslide

The tailslide is an aerobatic maneuver that starts from level flight with a 1/4 loop up into a straight vertical climb (at full power) until the aircraft loses momentum. When the aircraft's speed reaches zero and it stops climbing, the pilot maintains the aircraft in a stand-still position as long as possible (this is greatly helped by thrust vectoring on newer fighter aircraft), and as it starts to fall to the ground backward, tail first, the nose drops through the horizon to a vertical down position and the aircraft enters a dive. A 1/4 loop (push or pull) recovers to level flight.

Tailslides will transiently reverse the airflow on many aircraft surfaces, giving abnormal forces compared with forward flight. The control surface linkages must be able to handle these forces without damage or deformation. Not all airplanes capable of aerobatics are also capable of tailslide maneuvers.

== "Bell" maneuver ==
The bell is a variation of the tailslide maneuver, with the only difference being that the pilot performs a roll in the longitudinal axis during the final 1/4 loop (push or pull) while recovering to level flight, out of plane.

== Kvochur's bell ==
Kvochur's bell or Kvochur bell is a variation where the aircraft propels forward almost vertically while simultaneously braking and following the movement of its tail. It is named after Russian test pilot Anatoly Kvochur.

== See also ==
- Index of aviation articles
- Cobra maneuver
