= Falling leaf =

Aerobatic maneuver

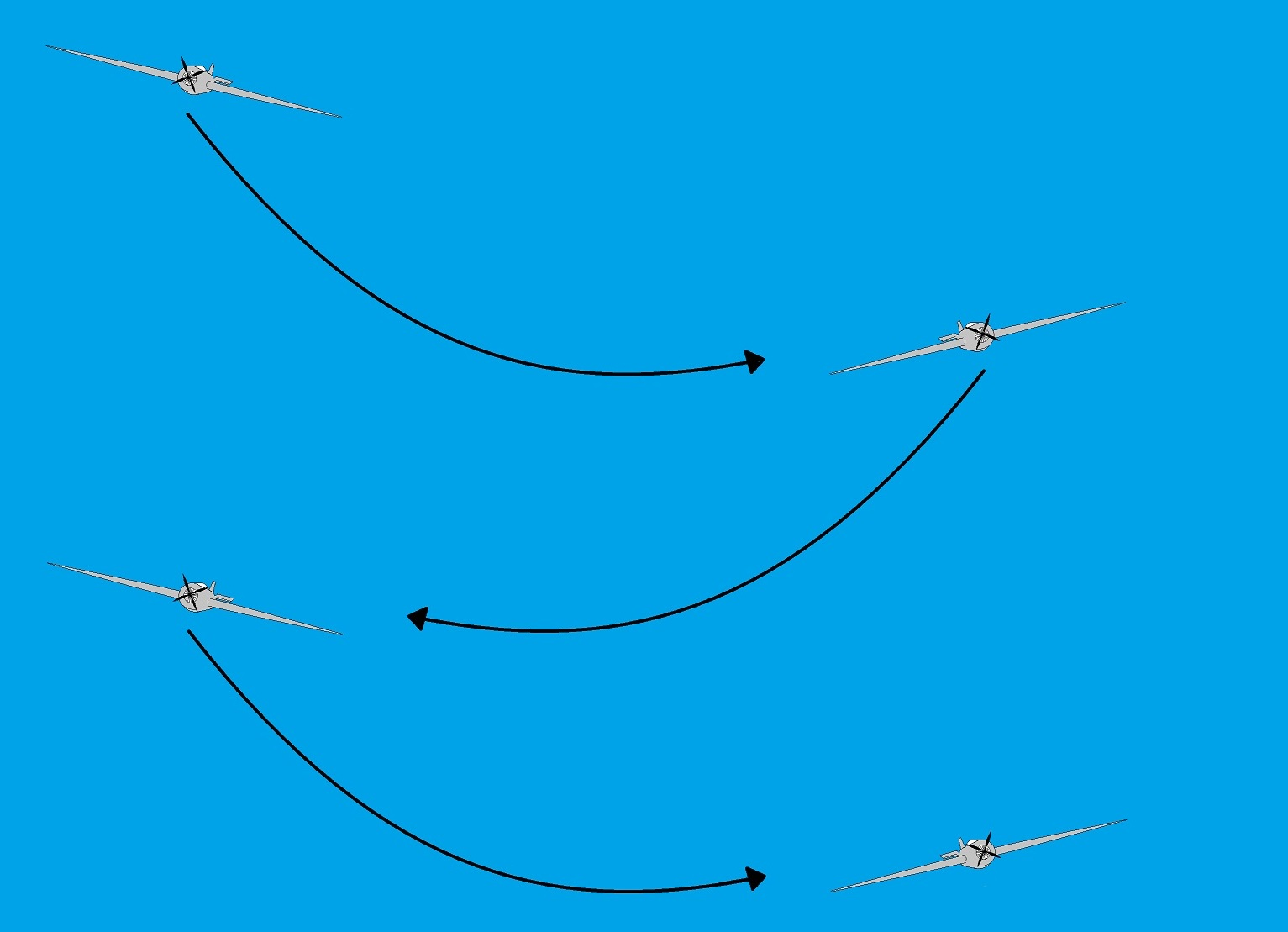
Diagram of a falling leaf maneuver

A falling leaf (also called a rudder stall or oscillation stall) is a maneuver in which an aircraft performs a wings-level stall (the airplane stops flying and starts falling) which begins to induce a spin. This spin is countered with the rudder, which begins a spin in the opposite direction that must be countered with rudder, and the process is repeated as many times as the pilot determines. During the maneuver, the plane resembles a leaf falling from the sky; first slipping to one side, stopping, and then slipping to the other direction; continuing a side-to-side motion as it drifts toward the ground.

== Maneuver ==
A falling leaf is a controlled stall performed in a fixed-wing aircraft. The maneuver is performed by purposely stalling the airplane and then carefully using the rudder to try to hold the aircraft on a steady course. The falling leaf consists of a constant rotation about the yaw axis while continually changing the direction. This is opposed to a flat spin, where the aircraft constantly rotates around its yaw axis in only one direction, similar to a Frisbee. The falling leaf is sometimes described as carefully "walking" the aircraft while stalled. The maneuver is typically performed mostly with the rudder, trimming with the elevator but keeping the ailerons neutral.

With the exception of landing, plus a few exotic maneuvers, stalling an aircraft is typically avoided in most conventional maneuvers, both because the plane is no longer flying normally, making the control surfaces sloppy and sluggish to react, and also because the aircraft is balanced on the edge of losing control. If the pilot can maintain a level attitude (nose position in relation to the horizon) and keep the wings level, the plane should theoretically float downward at its terminal velocity, which is partially determined by the shape of the plane in the direction of the relative wind. However, the slightest bit of variation in any of a number of factors, such as control surface inputs or air turbulence, will generally result in the aircraft beginning a rotation around both the yaw and roll axes, referred to as "incipient spin." The rotation may be self-induced, called autorotation, or, in maneuvers like the falling leaf, the rotation is pilot-induced by using the rudder.

The incipient spin begins when the aircraft first starts to rotate around the yaw axis. The rotation causes one wing to move faster than the other, which in turn induces some roll toward the slower wing. As the aircraft rolls it slips sideways. If the spin is not stopped, the plane will continue to roll and slip until it is in an out-of-control, helical spin towards the ground. However, if rudder is used to stop the incipient spin before it becomes a full spin, the direction can be reversed. In this case the incipient spin will begin in the opposite direction, so it must be stopped again, and the process is repeated throughout the maneuver.

The falling leaf is often used as a training maneuver, teaching the pilot to control the plane during a stall and helping beginners to overcome the fear that happens when a plane stalls unexpectedly. It is generally performed from a low-speed, straight, level stall, to avoid the buffeting, departure from the normal flightpath, and flat spin that can develop from powered stall. It is also used in aerobatic competitions and shows as a demonstration maneuver.

== Execution ==
A falling leaf from the perspective of the wingtip

A falling leaf is performed by first cutting the throttle and possibly deploying the speed brakes, if available, allowing the aircraft's speed to drop to the point where the relative wind can no longer hold the plane aloft, called the "stall speed." As the speed drops, the pilot holds the plane as level as possible in both the longitudinal direction (lengthwise) and the lateral direction (wing-wise). When the stall speed is reached, the plane will lose lift and begin to fall. Due to the low speed and high angle of attack (the angle of the wings to the relative wind), the aircraft loses its boundary layer, making the control surfaces barely responsive to pilot inputs. Therefore, the controls are usually pushed to their maximum limit to get the plane to respond.

As the aircraft stalls, the nose will begin to drop. At this point the pilot applies full or nearly full elevator, to hold the nose attitude near the horizon. While holding the ailerons neutral, the pilot applies full rudder in one direction, to induce a spin. When the spin begins, the pilot reverses the rudder direction. The aircraft will roll during the spin and will drop to the side in a slip before the rudder has a chance to take authority over the plane. As the rudder stops the spin, the wings will level, and then the incipient spin will begin in the opposite direction, causing the plane to roll and slip to that side. At this time, the pilot reverses the rudder, and this is repeated until the pilot decides to disengage from the maneuver. During the maneuver, the pilot attempts to hold the wings as level as possible, using only the rudder with no help from the ailerons.

To disengage from the maneuver, while simultaneously using the rudders to stop rotation, the pilot releases back pressure on the elevator in order to lower the nose and allow the plane to gain speed. Once the stall speed is passed, the pilot can pull back on the stick to return to normal flight. Therefore, the pilot must ensure that there is sufficient altitude to recover from the stall when performing and exiting the maneuver.
