= Air show =

Public event where aircraft are exhibited

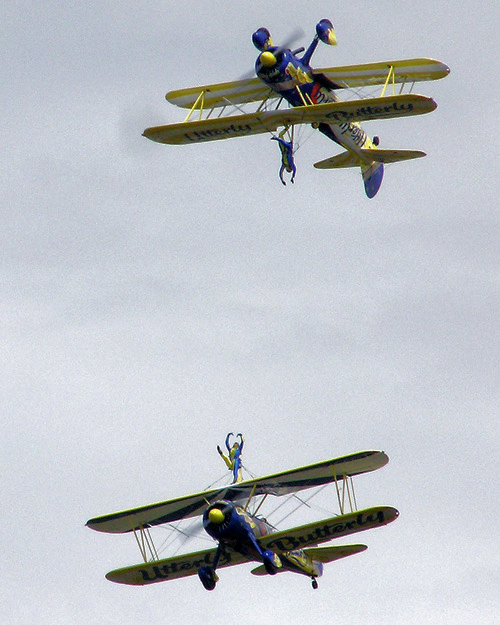
The AeroSuperBatics display team flying Boeing-Stearman PT-17 biplanes at a British air show

An air show (or airshow, air fair, air tattoo) is a public event where aircraft are exhibited. An air show is a public event featuring aircraft displays and flight demonstrations, including aerobatic performances and flyovers. They often include aerobatics demonstrations, without which they are called "static air shows" with aircraft parked on the ground.

The largest air show measured by number of exhibitors and size of exhibit space is Le Bourget, followed by Farnborough, with the Dubai Airshow and Singapore Airshow both claiming third place. The largest air show or fly-in by number of participating aircraft is EAA AirVenture Oshkosh, with approximately 10,000 aircraft participating annually. The biggest military airshow in the world is the Royal International Air Tattoo, at RAF Fairford in the United Kingdom. On the other hand, FIDAE in II Air Brigade of the FACH, next to the Arturo Merino Benítez International Airport in Santiago, Chile, is the largest aerospace fair in Latin America and the Southern Hemisphere.

== Outline ==
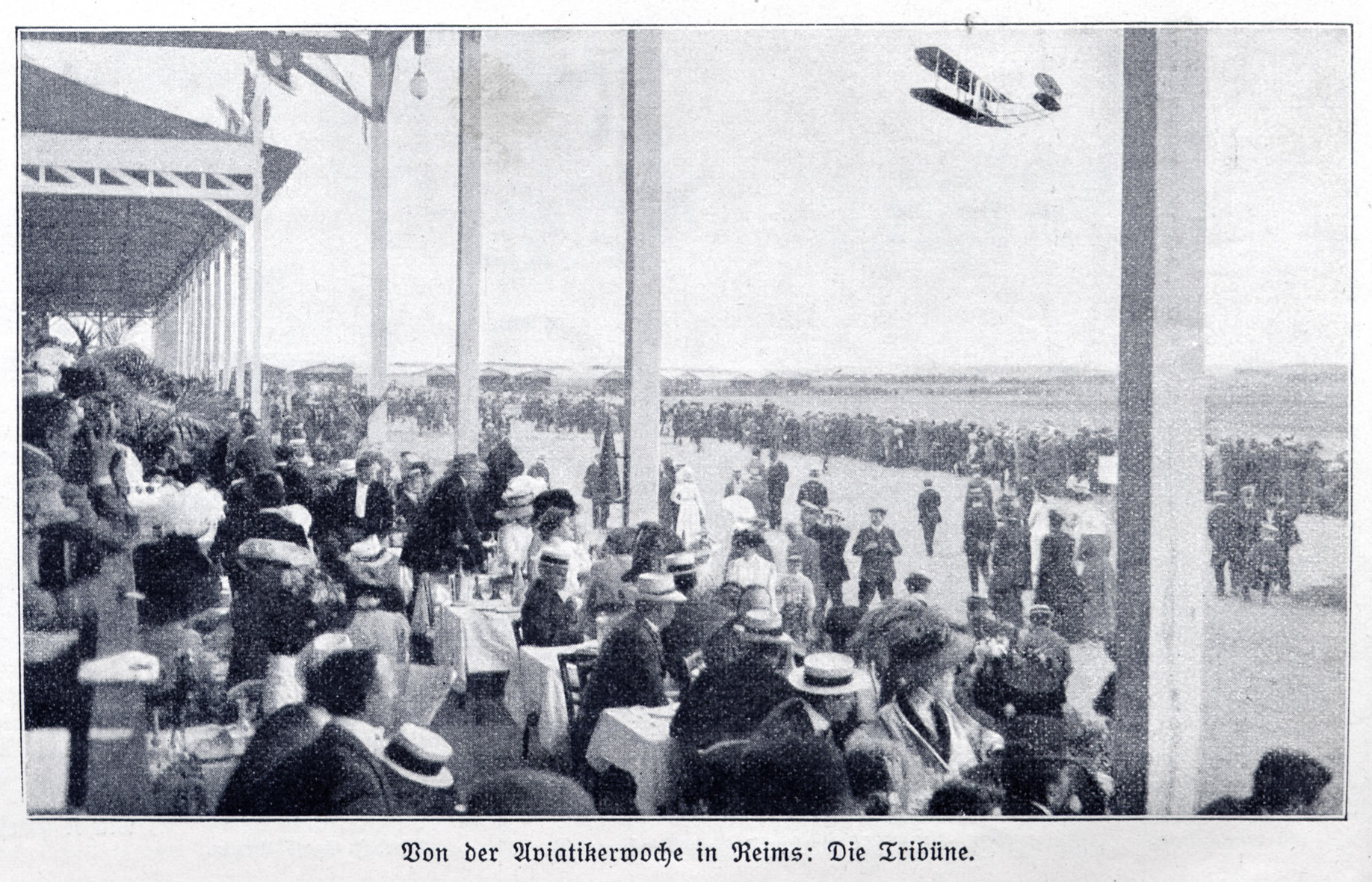
The Grande Semaine d'Aviation de la Champagne airshow in Reims, France in August 1909

Some airshows are held as a business venture or as a trade event where aircraft, avionics and other services are promoted to potential customers. Many air shows are held in support of local, national or military charities. Military air firms often organise air shows at military airfields as a public relations exercise to thank the local community, promote military careers and raise the profile of the military.

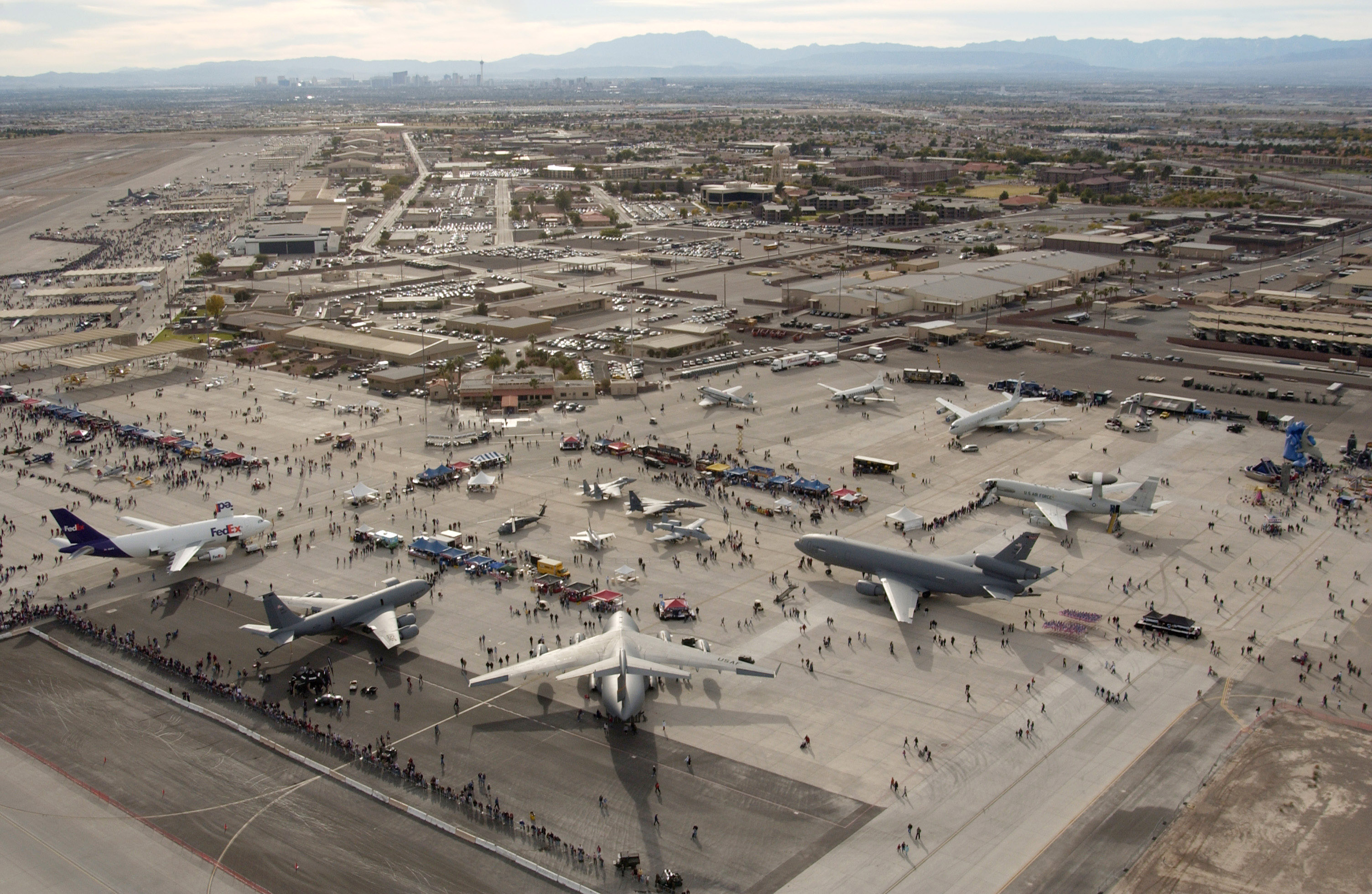
Aviation Nation 2006 at Nellis Air Force Base, United States

Air "seasons" vary around the world. The United States enjoys a long season that generally runs from March to November, covering the spring, summer, and fall seasons. Other countries often have much shorter seasons. In Japan air shows are generally events held at Japan Air Self-Defense Force bases regularly throughout the year. The European season usually starts in late April or Early May and is usually over by mid October. The Middle East, Australia, and New Zealand hold their events between January and March. However, for many acts, the "off-season" does not mean a period of inactivity; pilots and performers use this time for maintenance and practice.

The type of displays seen at shows are constrained by a number of factors, including the weather and visibility. Most aviation authorities now publish rules and guidance on minimum display heights and criteria for differing conditions. In addition to the weather, pilots and organizers must also consider local airspace restrictions. Most exhibitors will plan "full", "rolling" and "flat" display for varying weather and airspace conditions.

The types of shows vary greatly. Some are large scale military events with large flying displays and ground exhibitions while others held at small local airstrips can often feature just one or two hours of flying with just a few stalls on the ground. Air displays can be held during day or night with the latter becoming increasingly popular. Air shows often, but do not always, take place over airfields; some have been held over the grounds of stately homes or castles and over the sea at coastal resorts.

The first public international airshow, at which many types of aircraft were displayed and flown, was the Grande Semaine d'Aviation de la Champagne, held Aug. 22–29, 1909 in Reims. This had been preceded by what may have been the first ever gathering of enthusiasts, June 28 – July 19 of the same year at the airfield at La Brayelle, near Douai.

== Attractions ==
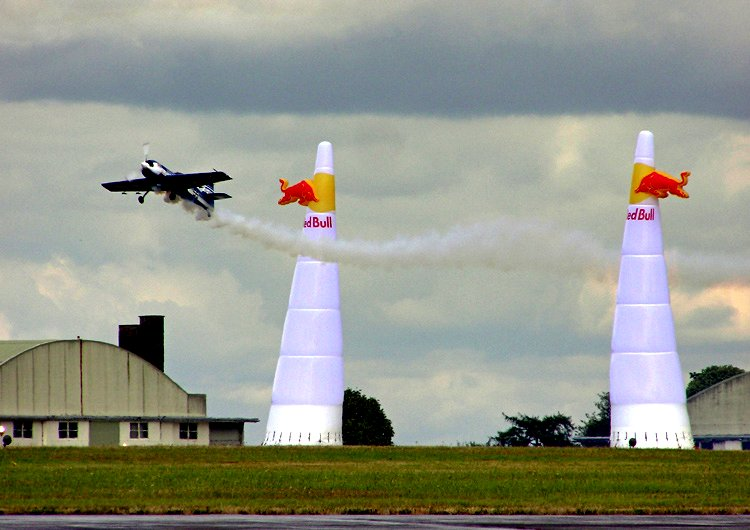
The Red Bull Air Race held at Kemble Airfield, Gloucestershire. The aircraft fly singly, and pass between pairs of pylons.

Before World War II, air shows were associated with long-distance air races, often lasting many days and covering thousands of miles. While the Reno Air Races keep this tradition alive, most air shows today primarily feature a series of aerial demos of short duration.

Most air shows feature warbirds, aerobatics, and demonstrations of modern military aircraft, and many air shows offer a variety of other aeronautical attractions as well, such as wing-walking, radio-controlled aircraft, water/slurry drops from firefighting aircraft, simulated helicopter rescues and sky diving.

Specialist aerobatic aircraft have powerful piston engines, light weight and big control surfaces, making them capable of high roll rates and accelerations.

Larger airshows can be headlined by military jet demonstration teams, such as the United States Navy Blue Angels, United States Air Force Thunderbirds, Royal Canadian Air Force Snowbirds, Royal Air Force Red Arrows, and Swiss Air Force Patrouille Suisse, among many others.

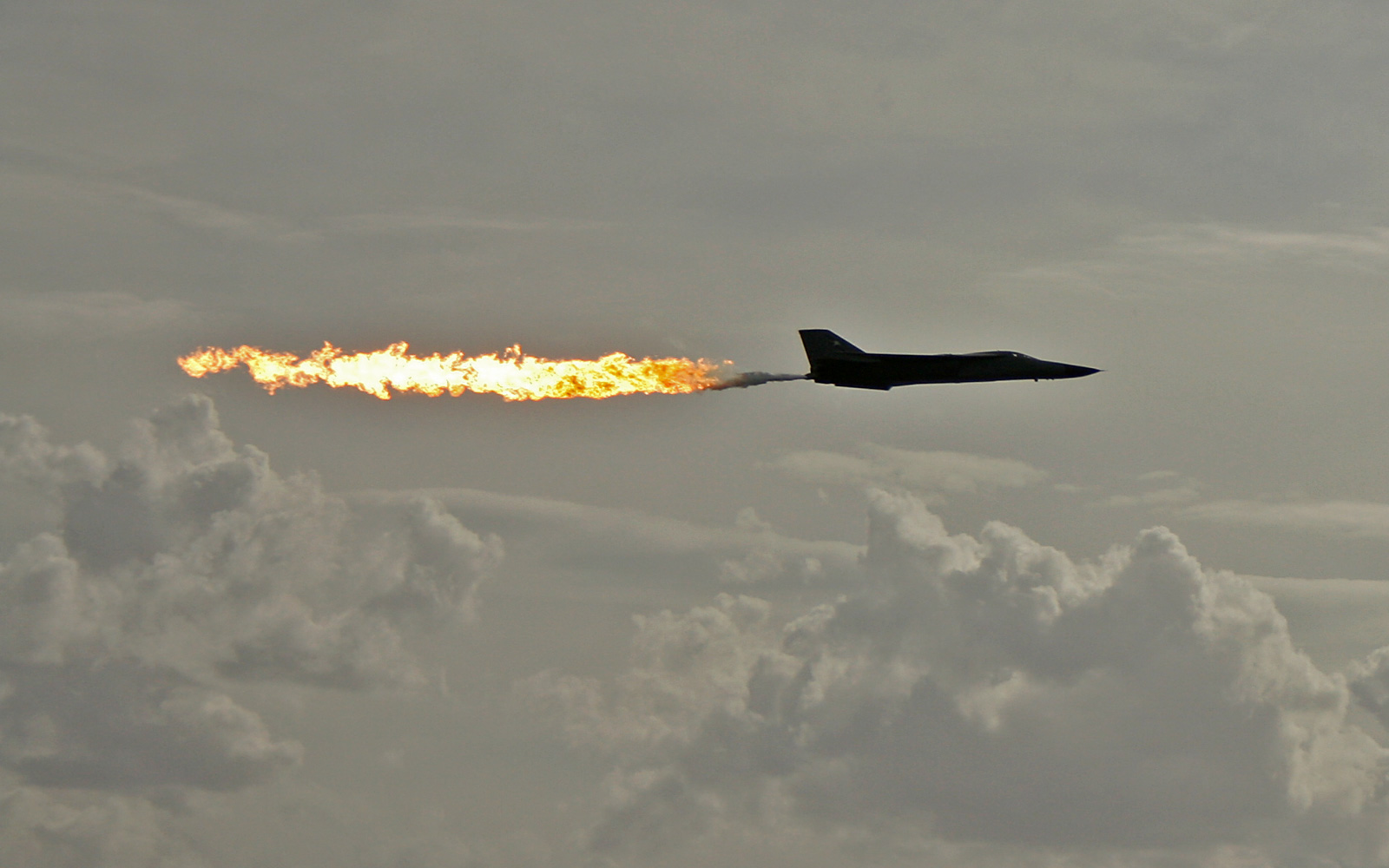
RAAF F-111 Aardvark performing a dump-and-burn fuel dump at the Australian International Airshow

Solo military demos, also known as tactical demos, feature one aircraft. The demonstration focuses on the capabilities of modern military aircraft. The display will usually demonstrate the aircraft's very short (and often very loud) rolls, fast speeds, slow approach speeds, as well as their ability to quickly make tight turns, to climb quickly, and their ability to be precisely controlled at a large range of speeds. Manoeuvres include aileron rolls, barrel rolls, hesitation rolls, Cuban-8s, tight turns, high-alpha flight, a high-speed pass, double Immelmans, and touch-and-gos. Tactical demos may include simulated bomb drops, sometimes with pyrotechnics on the ground for effect. Aircraft with special characteristics that give them unique capabilities will often display those in their demos; For example, Russian fighters with thrust vectoring may be used to perform the cobra maneuver or the Kulbit, while VTOL aircraft such as the Harrier may display such vertical capabilities or perform complex maneuvers with them. Some military air shows also feature demonstrations of aircraft ordnance in airstrikes and close air support, using either blanks or live munitions.

== Safety ==
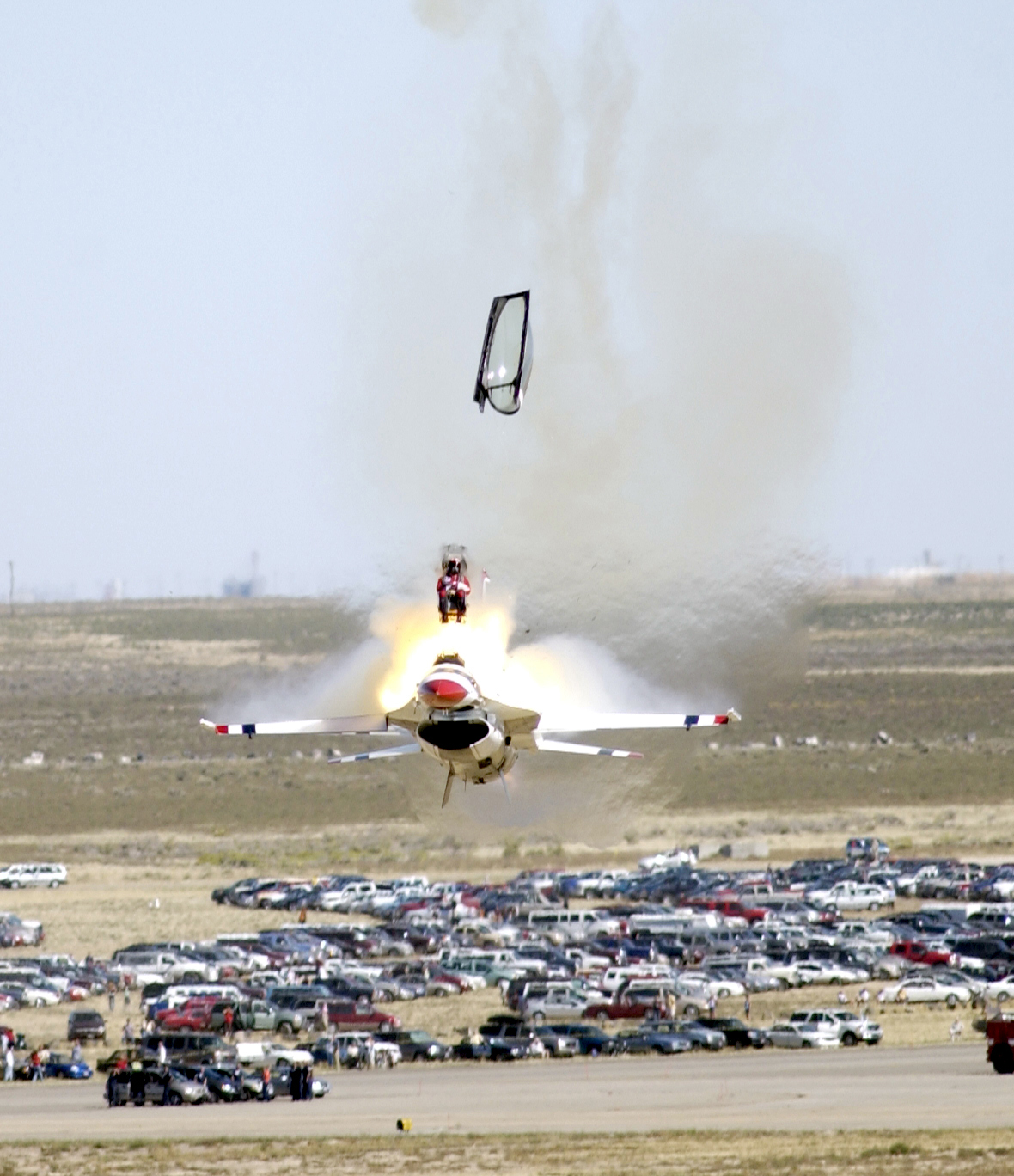
U.S. Air Force Thunderbirds Captain Christopher Stricklin ejecting from his F-16 Fighting Falcon after realizing he could not pull up after a Split S maneuver, Mountain Home Air Force Base, Idaho, September 14, 2003. The aircraft crashed seconds later with no loss of life.

Air shows may present some risk to spectators and aviators. Accidents have occurred, sometimes with a large loss of life, such as the 1988 Ramstein air show disaster (70 deaths) in Germany and the 2002 Sknyliv air show disaster (77 deaths) in Ukraine.

Because of these accidents, the various aviation authorities around the world have set rules and guidance for those running and participating in air displays. For example, after the breakup of an aircraft at 1952 Farnborough air show (31 deaths), the separation between display and spectators was increased. Air displays are often monitored by aviation authorities to ensure safe procedures.

In the United Kingdom, local authorities will first need to approve any application for an event to which the public is admitted. The first priority must be to arrange insurance cover and details can be obtained from local authorities. An added complication is a whole raft of legislation concerning health & safety, in particular corporate manslaughter, which can involve the event organiser being charged with a criminal offence if any of the insurances and risk assessments are not fully completed well in advance of the event.

Rules govern the distance from the crowds that aircraft must fly. These vary according to the rating of the pilot/crew, the type of aircraft and the way the aircraft is being flown. For instance, slower, lighter aircraft are usually allowed closer and lower to the crowd than larger, faster types. Also, a fighter jet flying straight and level will be able to do so closer to the crowd and lower than if it were performing a roll or a loop.

Pilots can get authorizations for differing types of displays (e.g., limbo flying, basic aerobatics to unlimited aerobatics) and to differing minimum base heights above the ground. To gain such authorisations, the pilots will have to demonstrate to an examiner that they can perform to those limits without endangering themselves, ground crew or spectators.

Despite display rules and guidance, accidents have continued to happen. However, air show accidents are rare and where there is proper supervision air shows have impressive safety records. Each year, organizations such as International Council of Air Shows and European Airshow Council meet and discuss various subjects including air show safety where accidents are discussed and lessons learned.

== See also ==
- Fly-in
- Flypast
- Barnstorming
- List of airshow accidents
- List of air shows
- Teardrop turn
- Whifferdill turn
