= Aresti Catalog =

Aerobatics manual

An aerobatic sequence in Aresti notation
Family	Contents
1	horizontal, 45° and vertical lines
2	turns and rolling turns
3	combinations of lines – essentially an extension of Family 1
4	no longer used; once contained spins, which are now part of Family 9
5	hammerheads (stall turns)
6	tail slides
7	loops and part loops, curved and angular
8	combinations of loops and lines
9	rotational elements: rolls, snap rolls (flicks) and spins
Aresti Catalog organization

The Aresti Catalog is the Fédération Aéronautique Internationale (FAI) standards document enumerating the aerobatic manoeuvers permitted in aerobatic competition. Designed by Spanish aviator Colonel José Luis Aresti Aguirre (1919–2003), each figure in the catalog is represented by lines, arrows, geometric shapes and numbers representing the precise form of a manoeuver to be flown.

The catalog broadly classifies manoeuvers into numbered families. Families 1 through 8 depict basic figures, such as turns, loops and vertical lines; family 9 depicts rotational elements that can be added to basic figures to increase difficulty, change the direction of flight or invert the g-loading of the aircraft.

== Notation ==
In Aresti notation, solid lines represent upright or positive-g manoeuvers and dashed lines represent inverted or negative-g manoeuvers; these are sometimes depicted in red. Thick dot represents the beginning of the manoeuver, while a short perpendicular line represents the end. Stalled wing manoeuvers such as spins and snap (flick) rolls are represented by triangles. Arrows represent rolling manoeuvers with numbers representing the extent and number of segments of the roll.

Symbol	Catalog number	Component; K	Figure; K
	8.40.3; 9.11.1.4; 9.4.3.4	13; 5; 11	29
Notation for a single aerobatic manoeuver comprising a spin, ¾-loop, and 4-point roll

The catalog assigns each manoeuver a unique identifier, called a catalog number, and difficulty factor, represented by the symbol K. When a basic figure is combined with one or more rolling elements, the resultant figure K is the sum of all component Ks. During an aerobatics competition, judges grade the execution of each manoeuver with a value between 10 (perfect) and 0 (highly flawed). Each figure's grades are multiplied by its K and summed to yield a total raw score for the flight.

Notational systems for aerobatic manoeuvers have been used since the 1920s. The first system accepted worldwide was published by French aviator François d'Huc Dressler in 1955 and 1956. It was used for international competitions through 1962.

José Aresti's development of a notation for aerobatic figures began while serving as an instructor in the Jerez Pilot Training School in the 1940s. By the end of 1961 Aresti published a dictionary of some 3,000 aerobatic manoeuvers, the Sistema Aerocryptographica Aresti. Then employed throughout Spain, the Spanish Aero Club urged its adoption internationally. The FAI's Aerobatics Commission, CIVA, elected to use the catalog beginning at the World Aerobatic Championships held in Bilbao, Spain in 1964; it has been in use worldwide and has evolved continually since then. Though the catalog had grown at one time to some 15,000 manoeuvers, a CIVA working group substantially streamlined it in the mid-1980s.

Following Aresti's death, a court fight ensued between his heirs and FAI, which once provided a free catalog online. The catalog is now only available in printed form for a fee from Aresti System S.L.

Software is available to design and display aerobatic sequences using Aresti notation.
