= Basic fighter maneuvers =

Aircraft movements during air combat

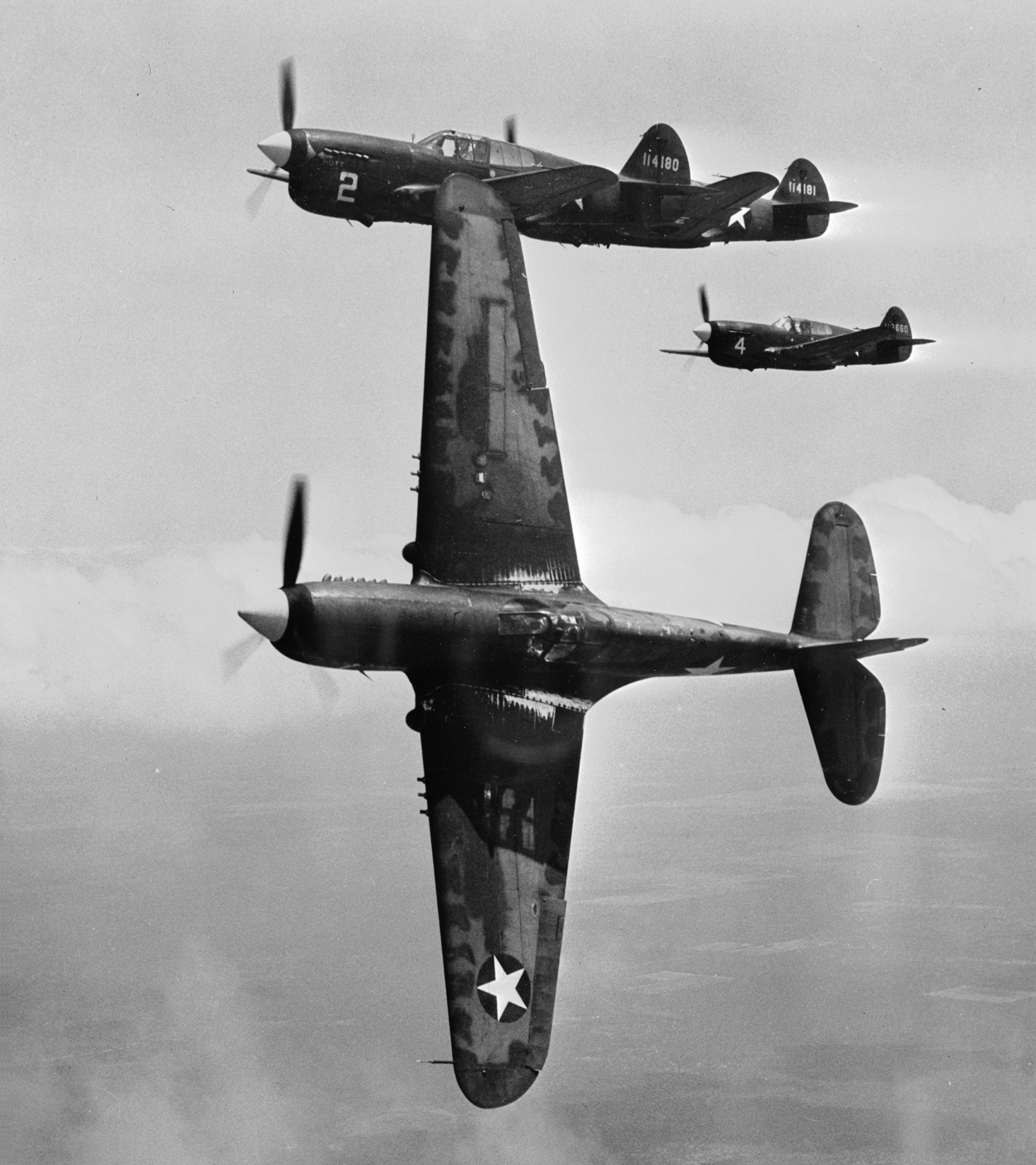
Four P-40 Warhawks performing training maneuvers.

Basic fighter maneuvers (BFM) are tactical movements performed by fighter aircraft during air combat maneuvering (ACM, also called dogfighting), to gain a positional advantage over the opponent. BFM combines the fundamentals of aerodynamic flight and the geometry of pursuit, with the physics of managing the aircraft's energy-to-mass ratio, called its specific energy.

Maneuvers are used to gain a better angular position in relation to the opponent. They can be offensive, to help an attacker gain an advantage on an enemy; or defensive, to help the defender evade an attacker's weapons. They can also be neutral, where both opponents strive for an offensive position or disengagement maneuvers, to help an escape.

Classic maneuvers include the lag pursuit or yo-yo, which add distance when the attacker may overshoot the target due to higher airspeed, the low yo-yo, which does the opposite when the attacker is flying too slow, the scissors, which attempts to drive the attacker in front of the defender, and the defensive spiral, which allows a defender to disengage from an attacker.

Situational awareness is often taught as the best tactical defense, removing the possibility of an attacker getting or remaining behind the pilot; even with speed, a fighter is open to attack from the rear.

== Introduction ==
Basic fighter maneuvers (BFM) are actions that a fighter aircraft makes during air combat maneuvering, historically known as dogfighting. The development of BFM began with the first fighter aircraft, during World War I, then continued with each following war, adapting to the changing weapons and technologies.

Basic fighter maneuvers consist of many varying tactical turns, rolls, and other actions to get behind or above an enemy, before the opponent can do the same. BFM are typically universal maneuvers which can be performed in almost any fighter aircraft, and are usually considered to be training maneuvers. Training usually begins with pilots flying the same type of aircraft, pitting only their skills against each other. In advanced training, pilots learn to fly against opponents in different types of aircraft, so pilots must learn to cope with different technological advantages as well, which more resembles real combat. In actual air combat maneuvering, variations of these basic maneuvers may become necessary, depending on the different types of aircraft involved, the weapon systems each side is using, and the number of aircraft involved.

BFM are used in the three-dimensional arena of air combat, where maneuvers are not limited by simple two-dimensional turns, such as during a car chase. BFM not only relies on an aircraft's turn performance, but also on the pilot's ability to make trade-offs between airspeed (kinetic energy) and altitude (potential energy) to maintain an energy level that will allow the fighter to continue maneuvering efficiently. BFM also relies on the pilot's understanding of the geometry of pursuit within the three-dimensional arena, where different angles of approach can cause different rates of closure. The fighter pilot uses these angles not only to get within a range where weapons can be used, but also to avoid overshooting, which consists either of flying out in front of the opponent, called a "wingline overshoot", or crossing the enemy's flight path, called a "flight path overshoot".

The fighter pilot with the most advantageous position is usually above or behind the opponent, and is commonly called the attacker. Conversely, the pilot in the disadvantageous position is usually either below or ahead of the opponent, and is referred to as the defender. Most maneuvers are offensive, such as the "barrel roll attack", "high Yo-Yo", "low Yo-Yo", and "lag roll". Defensive maneuvers more often consist of turning very aggressively to avoid the attacker's guns, with maneuvers like the "break" and the "high Yo-Yo defense"; sometimes tightening the turn, sometimes relaxing it, and other times reversing the turn. The defender will usually maneuver to force an overshoot, or to extend the range enough to dive away and escape. However, other "last-ditch" maneuvers are used by the defender when the attacker achieves a firing solution, or the defender's energy becomes depleted so that maximum turn performance cannot be maintained, such as "guns defense" or the "defensive spiral".

== History ==
Basic fighter maneuver development began during World War I, with maneuvers such as the "Immelmann", named after German pilot Max Immelmann, the "break" and the "barrel roll". The modern Immelmann differs from the original version, which is now called a stall turn or "Hammerhead turn". The Immelmann turn was an effective maneuver in the early part of the war but as aircraft technology advanced and fighter engines became more powerful, it became a dangerous maneuver, because the opponent could climb and shoot the German fighters when they were almost motionless at the top of the turn.

Billy Bishop, the top Canadian ace of World War I, described a break:

Watching carefully over your shoulder and judging the moment he will open fire, you turn your machine quickly so as to fly at right angles to him. His bullets will generally pass behind you during the maneuver.

— Billy Bishop, Shaw 1985, p. 25

During World War I, due to the low power of early aircraft, vertical movements were difficult and extended maneuvering led to a loss of energy. Combat tended to degenerate into individual attacks, the classic "dogfights". One specific maneuver that did emerge was the defensive Lufbery, in which several allied aircraft would fly in a circle so that any attackers trying to position against one of the aircraft would fly directly in front of the aircraft behind them. As engines became more powerful, three-dimensional tactics became available to counter the stalemate of the Lufbery, and by WWII it was no longer effective.

Development continued through each war, as aircraft and weapon systems became more advanced. Maneuvers such as the "combat spread" were first devised by pilots like Werner Mölders during the Spanish Civil War. A simple, non-turning form of the low-Yo-Yo is depicted in John T. Godfrey's description of his first kill, flying a Republic P-47 Thunderbolt over Europe during World War II;

Breathlessly I watched the 109 in between the breaks in the clouds as I dove. At 12,000 feet I leveled off and watched him up ahead. In diving I had picked up speed, and now had hit 550 miles an hour. I was about 500 feet below him and closing fast. Quick now, I've got time. I checked all around, in back and above me, to ensure that no other [Germans] were doing the same to me. My speed was slacking off now, but I still had enough to pick up that extra 500 feet and position myself 200 yards dead astern. The 109 flew as straight as an arrow, with no weaving. As his plane filled my gunsight, I pressed the [trigger].

— John T. Godfrey, Shaw 1985, p. 15

Much of the modern energy-management techniques, which are used in maneuvers like the Yo-Yos, were only described scientifically after John R. Boyd developed his energy–maneuverability theory (E–M theory) during the Vietnam War. Even so, as quoted by the U.S Navy Air Training Command, "1) The basics of ACM have not changed since the early days of aviation, and 2) A fighter pilot must maintain constant aggressiveness for success. As the [Red] Baron would say, 'All else is rubbish.'"

== Training ==
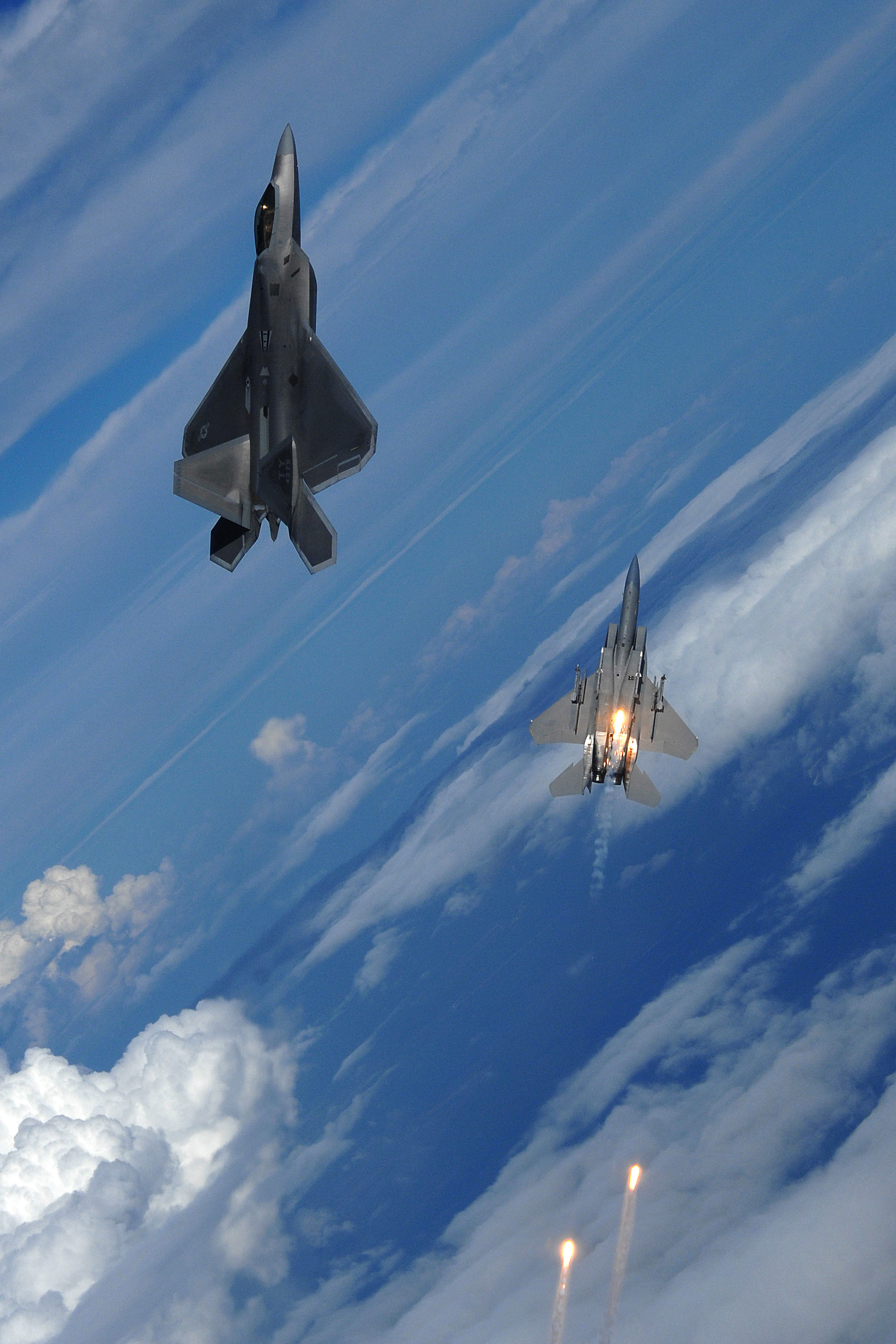
An F-22 Raptor (left) during training maneuvers against an F-15E Strike Eagle.

Basic fighter maneuvers (BFM) are used by fighter pilots during a dogfight to gain a positional advantage over an opponent. Pilots must have keen knowledge of not only their own aircraft's performance characteristics, but also of the opponents, taking advantage of their own strengths while exploiting the enemy's weaknesses. Pilots need good eyesight, situation awareness, and the ability to maneuver against an opponent in three dimensions. BFM are generally grouped into two categories:

- Primary BFM
- Relative BFM

Primary maneuvers are those which are performed without respect to an enemy's position. These are often simple maneuvers, such as climbs, turns, aileron rolls, slow rolls, and rudder rolls. Relative maneuvers are performed in relation to the motion of another aircraft. These are often more complex, including energy saving maneuvers, such as the high and low Yo-Yos, and repositioning maneuvers such as displacement rolls. It is easy to fall into the trap of considering BFM to be a series of set maneuvers providing a foolproof recipe for a dominant position. The reality is that BFM are a series of fluid and often improvised proactive and reactive actions, varying infinitely according to range, altitude, speed, aircraft type, weapons system type and any of an enormous range of other factors. An extremely successful tactic one day may yield unfortunate results if repeated the next day, and pilots often credit luck as a major factor.

BFM are normally considered to be individual maneuvers, where ACM is applied to the tactics behind dogfighting as a whole. In military training, BFM are often conducted against an adversary in the same type of aircraft. This allows the pilot to fly against a machine with known performance values and allows aircrew to build their awareness of important concepts such as sight picture, rates of closure and line of sight rates that are cues to being successful in the visual arena. This also allows pilots to build their BFM skills against one another, without either having a particular technological advantage.

Dissimilar air combat training (DACT) consists of advanced maneuvers performed by aircraft of two separate types (such as F-16 vs F/A-18). This training is valuable in that both pilots are not as aware of the performance capabilities and characteristics of the other aircraft and, therefore, must rely on the fundamental BFM principles and evaluation/decision making skills to maneuver to an advantageous position versus their opponent. In this type of training, the advantages of one type of fighter may differ greatly from the advantages of the other, so pilots learn to refine their BFM skills to make use of the opponent's weaknesses. Using BFM as the building blocks for multiple aircraft maneuvers, such as the finger four, loose deuce, and Thach weave, pilots learn how to maneuver in situations involving one against one, one against two, two against two, two against many, or even one against many. This type of training, introduced during the last stages of flight school, is more like actual combat, and is the most beneficial for aircrew once basic BFM skills are mastered.

== Principles ==
=== Specific energy ===
Energy is a primary factor in controlling and maneuvering an aircraft. If an attacker has too much energy, it may be easy to get in range but difficult to prevent an overshoot. Too little energy and the attacker may not be able to get in range at all. If the defender has more energy than the attacker, an escape may be possible, but too little energy and the defender will lose maneuverability.

In aviation, the term "energy" does not refer to the fuel nor the thrust it produces. Instead, thrust is referred to as "power". Energy is the state of the fighter's mass at any given time, and is the result of the power. Energy comes in two forms, which are kinetic and potential. Kinetic energy is a function of the fighter's mass and speed, while potential energy is a function of its mass, gravity and altitude. The combined potential and kinetic energy is called the total energy. Because the energy package is the combination of mass, speed and altitude, a fighter flying at low altitude but a high speed may have the same total energy as a fighter of equal mass, but flying at a low speed and high altitude.

One of the inputs to the formula for total energy is the mass of the object, in this case the aircraft. This means that two aircraft flying under identical conditions of speed and altitude will have different energy; the heavier aircraft will have higher energy. However, this does not imply that the heavier aircraft will be more maneuverable, as that mass will require more energy to accelerate. For this reason, a more useful measure is the specific energy, the energy per unit weight. Lighter aircraft generally have higher specific energy for any given operational conditions.

Energy state can be changed through the application of power. Heavier aircraft will require more power to change their energy state, so two aircraft with equal energy will not have the same maneuverability. This leads to the concept of "specific power" in the same fashion as specific energy. For any given operational condition, a selected speed and altitude for instance, any given aircraft will require a certain amount of power simply to maintain those conditions, due largely to the effects of drag. This gives rise to the concept of "specific excess power", the amount of additional power available to an aircraft over and above the power needed to maintain those flight conditions.

Specific excess power is normally expressed for an aircraft flying straight and level. Turning requires an expenditure of energy, both to change the energy state of the aircraft, as well as due to the additional induced drag that is naturally created as a side effect of generating the lift force required to change direction. This implies that an aircraft with higher specific excess power has higher sustained maneuverability performance. This overall concept is known as "energy maneuverability".

Maneuverability is not solely a factor of energy or specific power, many other factors like the efficiency of the wing platform at generating lift, or the load limits of the aircraft, can limit the maneuverability in ways that are not directly related to weight and power. This gives different aircraft very different types of performance under various maneuvers. For instance, an aircraft with high thrust for weight may have high specific excess power but nevertheless suffer from very high induced drag during turns - this was very common on delta wing aircraft for instance - in which case it will attempt to avoid turns and instead use climbs and dives to its advantage. Such aircraft are referred to as "energy fighters". Others, typically those with lower wing loading, may have less excess power but nevertheless be able to perform turns without losing as much energy, and are referred to as "angles fighters" or "dog-fighters".

When two aircraft meet in combat, they may have different energy states and energy retention. Typically, the fighter with higher energy and better retention will make an "energy move", like a high yo-yo to maintain the energy advantage, while the fighter at an energy disadvantage (angles fighter) will make an "angles move" such as a break turn, trying to use the opponent's energy to their own advantage.

=== Energy management ===
In combat, a pilot is faced with a variety of limiting factors. Some limitations are constant, such as gravity, structural integrity, and thrust-to-weight ratio. Other limitations vary with speed and altitude, such as turn radius, turn rate, and the specific energy of the aircraft. The fighter pilot uses BFM to turn these limitations into tactical advantages. A faster, heavier aircraft may not be able to evade a more maneuverable aircraft in a turning battle, but can often choose to break off the fight and escape by diving or using its thrust to provide a speed advantage. A lighter, more maneuverable aircraft can not usually choose to escape, but must use its smaller turning radius at higher speeds to evade the attacker's guns, and to try to circle around behind the attacker.

BFM are a constant series of trade-offs between these limitations to conserve the specific energy state of the aircraft. Even if there is no great difference between the energy states of combating aircraft, there will be as soon as the attacker accelerates to catch up with the defender. However, potential energy can easily be traded for kinetic energy, so an aircraft with an altitude advantage can easily turn the potential energy into speed. Instead of applying thrust, a pilot may use gravity to provide a sudden increase in speed, by diving, at a cost in the potential energy that was stored in the form of altitude. Similarly, by climbing the pilot can use gravity to provide a decrease in speed, conserving the aircraft's kinetic energy by changing it into altitude. This can help an attacker to prevent an overshoot, while keeping the energy available in case one does occur.

=== Turn performance ===
Both turn rate (degrees per second), and turn radius (diameter of the turn), increase with speed, until the "corner speed" is reached. Corner speed is defined as the minimum speed at which the maximum sustainable g-force load can be generated (the load at which power equals drag), and varies with the fighter's structural design, wing loading characteristics, weight (including added weight from missiles, drop-tanks, etc...), and thrust capabilities. It often falls in the area of 250–400 kn (290–460 mph; 460–740 km/h). The maximum sustainable-load the aircraft can generate also varies, but is typically between 3 and 5 g's. At the corner speed, the fighter can attain its maximum turn-rate, flying the craft just at the edge of buffeting (the turbulence preceding a stall). Below this speed, the aircraft will be limited to flying at lower g's, resulting in a decrease in turn rate. If the pilot attempts to "pull" more g's, the aircraft will buffet and aerodynamically stall. On the other hand, if the fighter is flown above its corner speed it will be able to pull higher g's, but doing so will cause it to lose airspeed from the excess drag created. Turning at the maximum sustainable-load at speeds above the corner speed will result in an increase in turn radius which, respectively, will cause a decrease in turn rate.

"Instantaneous turn-rate" describes turns which are above the maximum sustainable-load. These turns can be as high as 9 g's before the pilot begins to lose consciousness (G-LOC). These turns can have a very small turn radius, but cause a loss in energy, either in the form of speed or altitude. Therefore, these turns are unsustainable, causing the fighter to lose massive amounts of airspeed, sometimes reaching stall speed in as little as a quarter turn. Above the maximum sustained turn-rate, aerodynamic drag exceeds the maximum engine thrust (aircraft has zero "excess power"), meaning aircraft specific energy will be lost even when applying full engine power. Only by turning the aircraft at its best "sustained turn-rate" can the aircraft maintain its specific energy. However, situations in combat may require a change in energy, and energy may also be increased by pulling less than the maximum sustained g-force load.

=== Pursuit curves ===
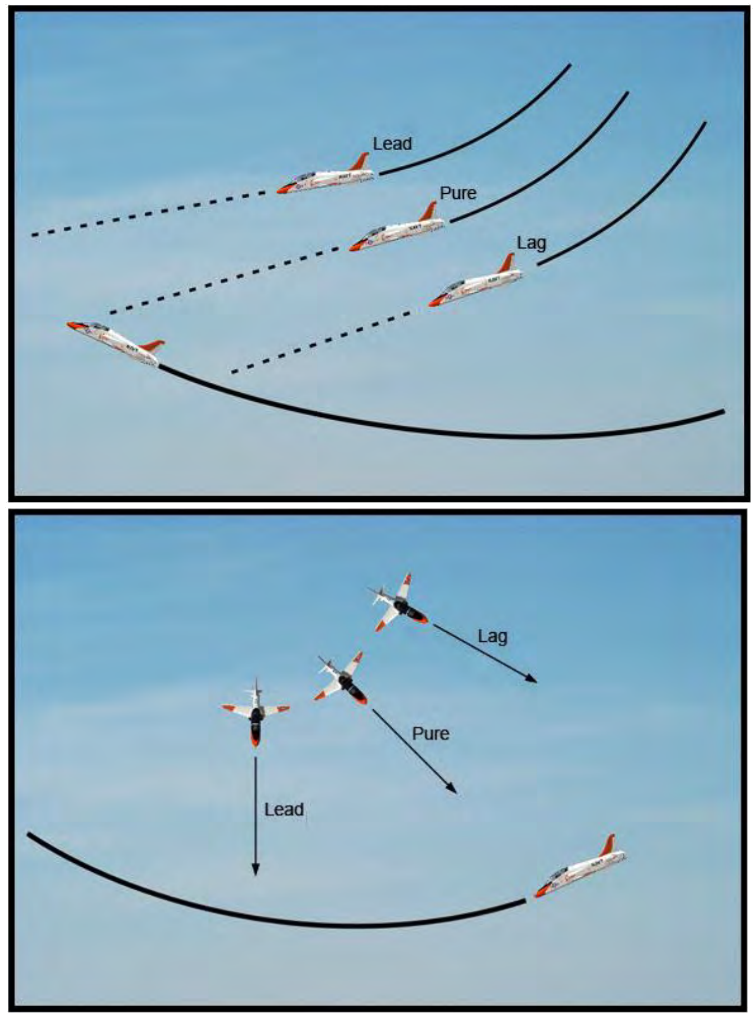
Lead, pure and lag pursuit curves. Top: In-plane. Bottom: Out-of-plane

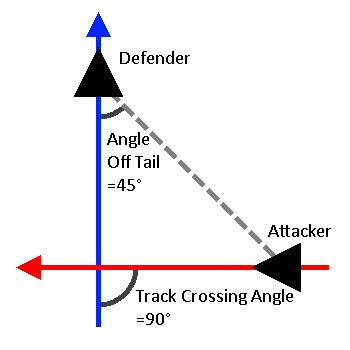
A visualization of TCA and AOT.

Successful BFM requires geometry as much as it does skill and stamina. Pilots must know their aircraft's corner speed, as well as optimum angles of bank (AOB) and angles of attack (AOA), without consciously thinking about them. Most importantly, the pilot must remain aware of the Track Crossing Angle (TCA), also sometimes called an Angle-Off, which is the angle between flight paths, and the Angle Off Tail (AOT), also called Aspect Angle, which is the angle between the defender's flight path and a line between defender and attacker. A high TCA causes a high rate of closure, but makes achieving a suitable guns solution nearly impossible. Acquiring a low AOT and TCA (getting on an enemy's tail) is usually the primary goal before an overshoot occurs. An uncooperative defender may try to take advantage of the high closure rate by turning to increase TCA, forcing an overshoot.

The TCA is defined by the actual movement path of both aircraft, but is often estimated by Heading Crossing Angle (HCA), defined by the heading of the attacking aircraft's nose in relation to the defender's nose. TCA are generally grouped into three categories, called "pursuit curves". "Lead pursuit" occurs when the nose of the attacker points ahead of the defender, while "pure pursuit" happens when the attacker's nose points directly at the defender. If the attacker's nose points behind the defender, the condition is known as "lag pursuit".

==== Lead pursuit ====
The primary purpose for lead pursuit is to provide closure, even when chasing a faster opponent. The low TCA presented during lead pursuit allows the attacker to quickly decrease the forward, lateral, and vertical separation between aircraft, simply by traveling a shorter path. However, lead pursuit causes the AOT to increase at a rapid rate if the defender is out-turning the attacker. This causes the closure rate to increase as well, and, in an attempt to prevent an overshoot, the attacker will have to pull an increasingly tighter turn upon nearing the defender.

An attacker in lead pursuit is well within the defender's rear view. Unless the defender has enough of a speed advantage to escape by relaxing the turn and dropping into a shallow dive, the defender will likely turn sharply in an effort to increase the AOT, forcing the attacker to turn even harder, to overshoot, or to perform a maneuver out of the horizontal plane to compensate.

Lead pursuit is used during gun attacks, because the fast motion of combat requires that the aircraft's cannons be aimed at a point in space ahead of the defender, where the enemy will be when the bullets arrive. This is called "leading the target". Lead pursuit presents the attacker with difficulty in maintaining sight of the opponent, as the nose of the attacking aircraft becomes an obstruction to the pilot's view.

==== Pure pursuit ====
Like lead pursuit, pure pursuit is used to provide closure. However, closure is not as rapid, nor is the rate of increase in AOT. This is not as effective against a faster moving opponent, so the attacker may need to accelerate to maintain pure pursuit. Pure pursuit is used when acquiring a missile lock for missiles with caged seekers. It both places the attacker further aft of the defender and presents the defender with the smallest amount of surface area to see. This complicates evasive action, since only the front of the attacking aircraft is in view.

==== Lag pursuit ====
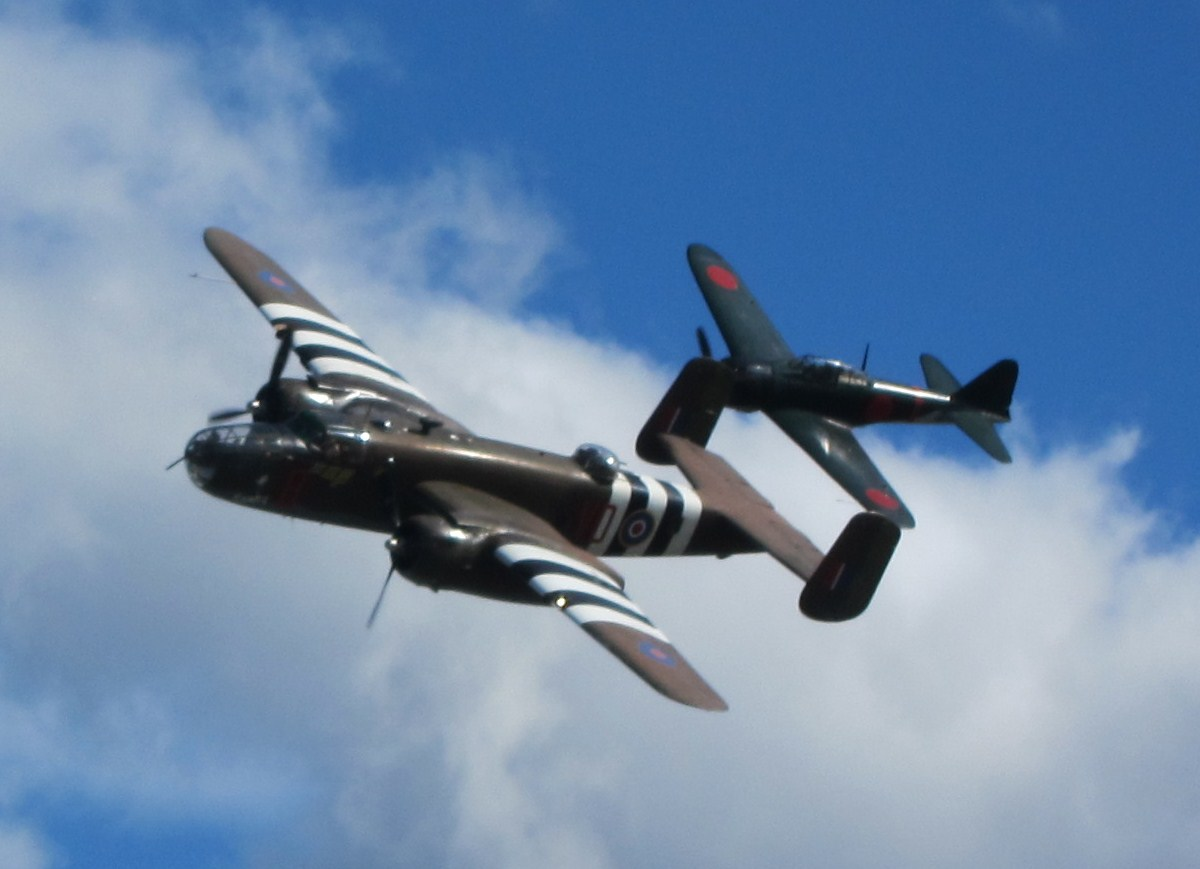
A Japanese A6M3 Zero in cold-side lag pursuit behind a US B-25 Mitchell.

Lag pursuit is used to stop or reverse closure rate and to decrease the aspect angle, while allowing the attacker to maintain or increase forward separation (also called nose/tail separation, or nose-to-tail). Following outside the defender's turn radius, the attacker can maintain or increase energy while forcing the defender to turn at an energy depleting rate.

"Hot side" lag occurs when there is a large amount of forward separation between aircraft, showing the top side of the defending fighter. This puts the attacker in the defender's rear view, and the common defense is to tighten the turn. "Cold side" lag occurs when there is little nose-to-tail separation, leaving the belly of the defending fighter in view. This puts the attacker in the defender's blind spot, and the common defense is to reverse the turn. Unless the defender is markedly more maneuverable, and lateral separation is just right, lag pursuit can not be maintained for long, causing the AOT to decrease until a suitable firing solution is presented.

=== Out-of-plane maneuvers ===
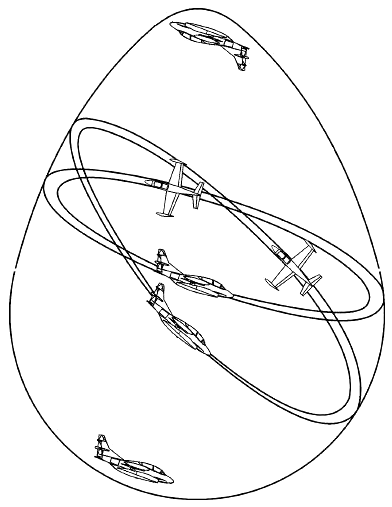
Maneuvering planes, showing oblique and vertical turns.

Maneuvers are rarely performed in the strictly vertical or horizontal planes. Most turns contain some degree of "pitch" or "slice". During a turn in an oblique plane, a pitch turn occurs when the aircraft's nose points above the horizon, causing an increase in altitude. A slice turn happens when the nose points below the horizon, causing a decrease in altitude. The purpose is not only to make the aircraft harder for an enemy to track, but also to increase or decrease speed while maintaining energy.

An out-of-plane maneuver enhances this effect, by diverting the fighter into a new plane of travel. Increasing the pitch or slice can quickly provide a change in speed, which can just as quickly be reversed by returning to the original plane of travel. Out-of-plane maneuvers are not only used to provide a reduction in turn radius, but also causes the fighter to fly a longer path in relation to the direction of travel. A maneuver such as a high Yo-Yo is used to slow closure and to bring the fighter into lag pursuit, while a low Yo-Yo is used to increase closure and to bring the fighter into lead pursuit.

During an out-of-plane maneuver, the attacker's nose no longer points at the defender. Instead, the aircraft is rolled until its lift vector (an imaginary line running vertically from the center of the aircraft, perpendicular to its wings), is aligned either ahead of, directly at, or behind the defender, using roll rate instead of turn rate to set the proper pursuit curve. The aircraft's velocity vector (an imaginary line in the direction of motion) will be pulled in the direction of the lift vector.

==== Displacement rolls ====
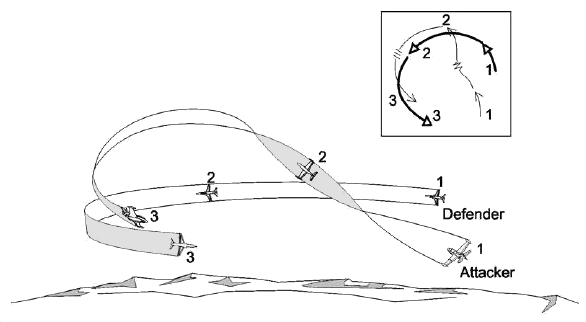
Typical displacement roll

A useful type of out-of-plane maneuver employed to decrease AOT are various barrel rolls called displacement rolls, in order to shift the aircraft laterally from its projected flight path onto a new flight path. By controlling the roll rate the pilot can control the degree of displacement. An attacker following a more maneuverable opponent may become stuck in lag pursuit (outside the defender's turn radius), unable to achieve a firing solution. By displacing the turn, the two aircraft's flight paths will eventually cross. The AOT will then decrease until the nose of the attacker's aircraft points momentarily at the defender, and then ahead of the defender. A displacement roll is a good tactic whenever a reduction in turn radius is needed, but a decrease in turn rate is allowed.

=== Positioning ===
There are three basic situations in air combat maneuvering requiring BFM to convert to a favorable result, which are neutral, offensive, and defensive. Most relative maneuvers can be grouped into one of these three categories.

==== Neutral ====
Neutral positions generally occur when both opponents spot each other at the same time. Neither the pilot nor the opponent have the advantage of surprise. Neither has the ability to point the nose of their aircraft at the opponent with sufficient range to employ forward firing ordnance (missiles/guns) prior to the opponent presenting a threat of a similar manner. Each is focused on converting to an offensive situation while forcing their opponent into a defensive.

==== Offensive ====
An offensive position generally occurs when the pilot gets sight of the opponent first. With the advantage of surprise, the pilot can maneuver into a better position to attack the opponent, making it more difficult for the enemy to evade the attack. Common tactics include increasing altitude and attempting to place the fighter directly between the sun and the opponent. This helps put the pilot in a dominant position, primarily concerned with prosecuting their advantage for a kill. An offensive position is generally defined as the ability to get above or behind the enemy. The pilot is able to create an energy advantage, providing the ability to swoop down on the opponent and spray the area with bullets while using the speed to climb back to a safe altitude. The attacker also has an orientation-related advantage, being able to press the attack while avoiding the enemy's weapons.

==== Defensive ====
A defensive position usually occurs when the pilot spots the attacker late. Usually below or ahead of the opponent, the pilot is in a weak position, primarily concerned with denying a shot to the opponent and converting to a neutral position. The secondary goal is either to escape or to achieve a dominant position. If the attacker is at an energy disadvantage, the defender will likely use the speed to disengage, but, if the attacker is moving much faster, the defender will usually maneuver in order to force a dangerous overshoot. A dangerous overshoot happens when an attacker flies out in front of the defender, causing their roles to be reversed.

== Concepts ==
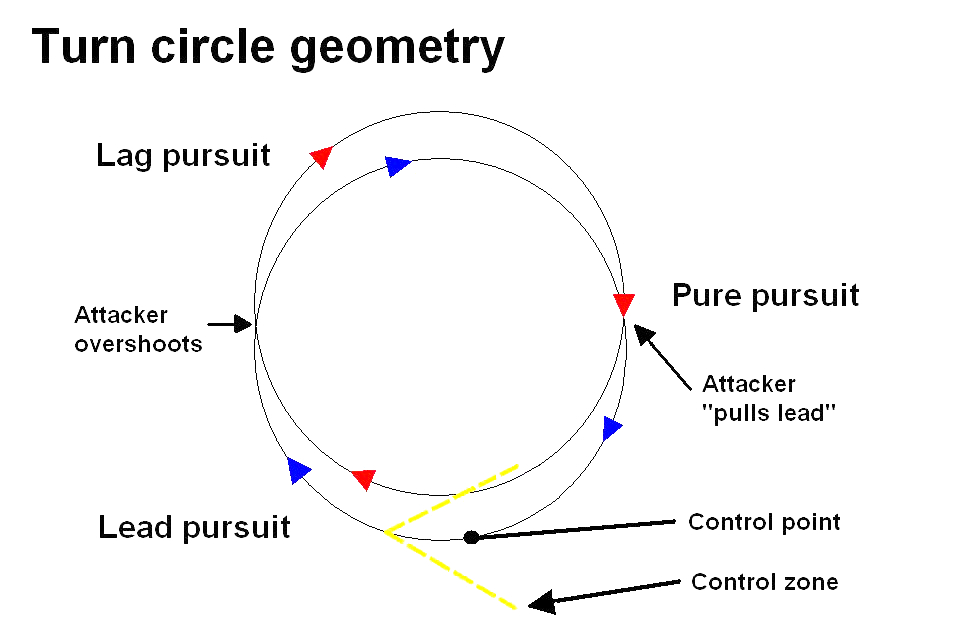
Turn circle geometry. Even though depicted as flying at the same turn rate and turn radius, closure occurs during lead pursuit and then reverses during lag pursuit, with the greatest nose/tail separation at the moment the attacker pulls lead.

Once an attacker gets behind a defender, there are three problems to solve in order to prosecute the kill. The attacker must be able to get into the same geometric plane as the defender, get in range without overshooting, and be able to lead the target. The defender will usually turn aggressively to spoil the attacker's solution.

=== Turn circle ===
Aircraft turn in circular motions, following a circumference around a central point. The circumference is often referred to as the "bubble", while the central point is often called the "post". Any change in the g-force load on the aircraft causes a change in the bubble's size as well as a change in turn radius, moving the post in relation to the fighter. Because an aircraft turning at its maximum load cannot turn any tighter, any aircraft located between such a fighter and its post is momentarily safe from attack. It is in this area where an attacking fighter will usually try to position itself.

Once inside the defender's bubble, the attacker will be in lead pursuit and may have an opportunity for a lucky "snapshot" hit. If the attacker can maneuver onto the defender's flight path before an overshoot occurs, the attacker will be able to stop or reverse closure rate. The most desirable position is following the defender's flight path at a distance equal to one turn radius behind the opponent. This position, from which the attacker will be able to safely maintain command of the fight, is termed the "control point". The control point lies in the heart of an imaginary, cone-shaped area, called the "control zone", and it is within this zone that the attacker will have both sufficient time and range to react to the defender's countermeasures.

=== Overshoots ===
During a dogfight, the term "overshoot" refers to situations in which the attacker either crosses the enemy's flight path or passes the defender, ending up in front.

Passing the defender is referred to as a "wingline overshoot". Also called a "3-9 line overshoot" or a "dangerous overshoot", this occurs when an attacking aircraft approaches too fast and accidentally crosses the defender's wingline (an imaginary line passing through the center of the aircraft at the 3 o-clock and 9 o-clock positions). A wingline overshoot is usually referred to as "flying out in front" and causes "role reversal", putting the attacker in range of the defender's weapons, and the attacker suddenly becomes the defender.

When the attacker crosses the defender's flight path, the situation is called a "flight path overshoot". This happens when an attacker fails to control closure and crosses the defender's flight path from behind. Although not necessarily dangerous, it is possible for a flight path overshoot to cause the attacker to fly out in front of the defender. More often, however, it greatly reduces the attacker's angular advantage over the defender. Flight path overshoots are divided into two categories, called "control-zone overshoots" and "in-close overshoots".

A "control-zone overshoot" occurs when the attacker crosses the defender's flight path from behind the front edge of the control zone. After a control-zone overshoot, the defender will continue turning in the same direction to retain the acquired angular advantage, trying to prevent the attacker from getting a good aim.

An '"in-close overshoot" happens when the attacker overshoots the defender's flight path ahead of the control zone. This gives the defender the opportunity to reverse the turn and possibly to cause a wingline overshoot, allowing the defender to move in behind the attacker and reverse their roles.

=== Circle flow ===
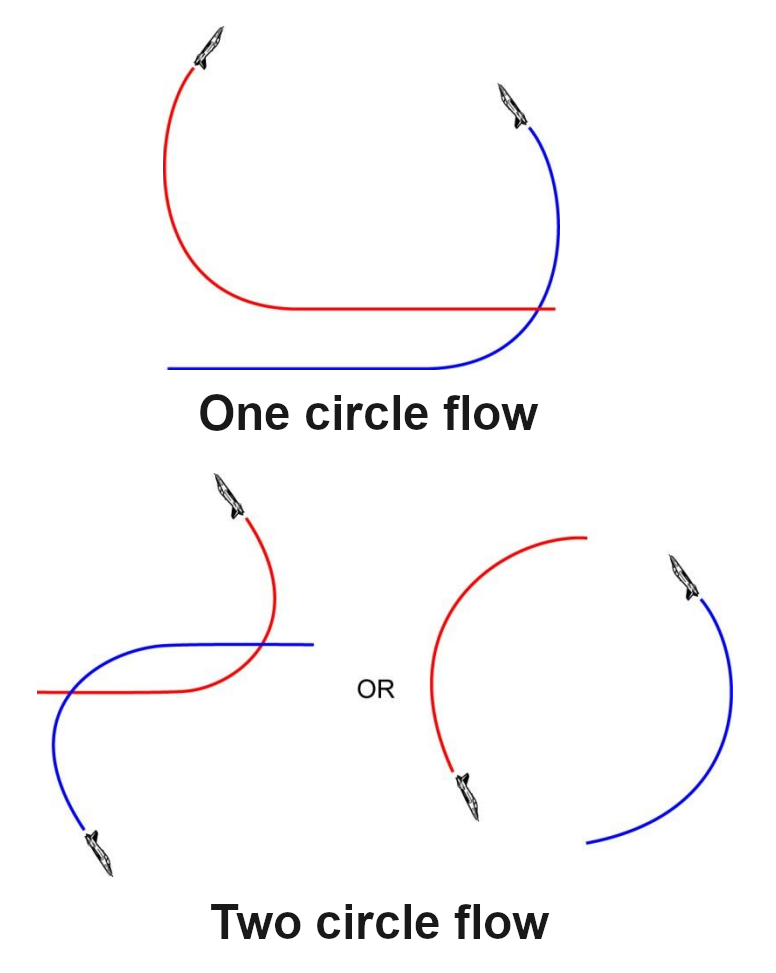
Circle flow

Aircraft can turn either towards or away from each other. How the opponent turns in relation to the other determines the flow of the fight. If two fighters meet head-on, they will usually make a very close, neutral pass, called a "merge". After the pass, both fighters may turn to engage. If the two fighters turn in the same direction (i.e.: both turn to the north), they will be traveling toward each other along the same turn circle. This type of engagement is known as "one-circle flow". If the aircraft turn in opposite directions (e.g.: one turns north but the other turns south), they will move away from each other, flying around to engage each other on separate turn circles. This is called "two-circle flow".

==== One-circle flow ====
One-circle flow will result in another merge, unless an angular advantage can be obtained. During one-circle flow, the fighter with the smaller turn radius will have the advantage. Pilots will often pitch up out of plane while increasing thrust, to help minimize turn radius. Because it does not really matter where the two fighters meet in the circle, turn rate is of little importance during one circle flow. Therefore, it is often called a radius fight. An out-of-plane maneuver, such as a displacement roll, is a viable option for reducing turn radius.

==== Two-circle flow ====
Two-circle flow will also result in another merge. In two-circle flow, turn radius is of little importance, because what matters is which fighter can get back to the merging place first. Two-circle flow is a turn rate fight, and the angular advantage usually goes to the aircraft with the higher turn rate at its corner speed. Pilots will often slice turn in order to maximize their turn rate.

==== Vertical flow ====
A third option is called vertical flow, in which one or both fighters turn toward the vertical plane. If both fighters go up or down, the fight becomes one-circle flow. If one fighter goes up or down, while the other turns horizontally, it is really a modified version of one-circle flow. However, if one fighter goes up while the other goes down, it becomes two-circle flow.

In both types of flow, the closest possible merge is desirable to keep the enemy at an angular disadvantage. Although circle flow is often described using neutral merges, the concept applies anytime two aircraft maneuver in relation to each other and the horizon. For instance, the "flat scissors" is an example of one-circle flow, while the "rolling scissors" is an example of two-circle flow.

== Maneuvers ==
=== Combat spread ===
The combat spread is the most basic of maneuvers used prior to engagement. A pair of attacking aircraft will separate, often by a distance of one mile horizontal by 1500 feet vertical. The fighter with the lower altitude becomes the defender, while the wingman flies above in the "perch" position. The defender will then attempt to lure their opponents into a good position to be attacked by the wingman.

=== Defensive split ===
A pair of fighters encountering one or two attackers will often use a defensive split. The maneuver consists of both defenders making turns in opposite directions, forcing the attackers to follow only one aircraft. This allows the other defender to circle around, and maneuver behind the attackers.

=== Sandwich ===
A sandwich maneuver begins with two defenders flying line-abreast, with typically about a mile of lateral separation. When an attacker maneuvers onto the tail of one aircraft, the defender will make a sharp turn away from the wingman. At the same time, the wingman turns in the same direction as the defender. When both fighters turn 90 degrees, they will come into single-file alignment with each other, "sandwiching" the attacker in the middle. Because the attacker is distracted chasing the defender, this allows the wingman to maneuver onto the attacker's tail for an easy shot.

=== Break ===
Spotting an attacker approaching from behind, the defender will usually break. The maneuver consists of turning sharply across the attacker's flight path, to increase AOT (angle off tail). The defender is exposed to the attacker's guns for only a brief instant (snapshot). The maneuver works well because the slower moving defender has a smaller turn radius and bigger angular velocity, and a target with a high crossing speed (where the bearing to the target is changing rapidly) is very difficult to shoot. This can also help to force the attacker to overshoot, which may not be true had the turn been made away from the attacker's flight path.

=== Barrel roll attack ===
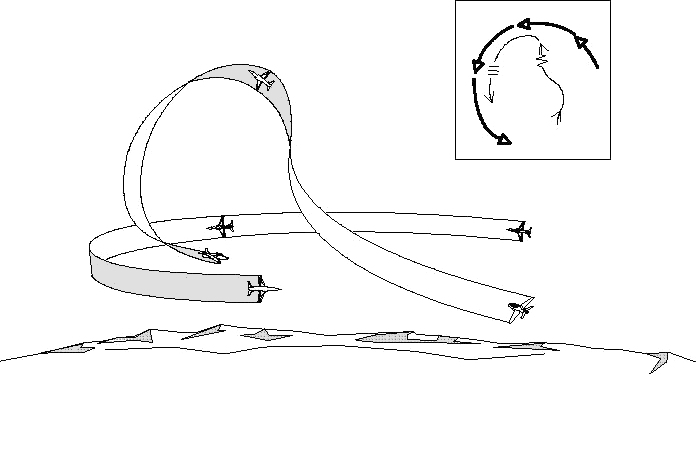
Barrel roll attack

The counter to a break is often a displacement roll called a barrel roll attack. A barrel roll consists of performing a roll and a loop, completing both at the same time. The result is a helical roll around a straight flight path. The barrel roll attack uses a much tighter loop than the roll, completing a full loop while only executing 3/4 of a roll. The result is a virtual 90 degree turn, using all three dimensions, in the direction opposite of the roll. Rolling away from the defender's break, the attacker completes the roll with the aircraft's nose pointed in the direction of the defender's travel.

=== High-side guns pass ===
If the attacker has a significant altitude advantage, a high-side guns pass is usually prudent. Sometimes called a "swoop", "boom and zoom", "hit and split", plus a variety of other names, it consists of a powered dive toward the rear quarter of a lower flying opponent. Shooting with the cannons in a single, high-speed pass, the attacker uses excess kinetic energy to disengage from the fight in a zoom climb back to a safe altitude, restoring the potential energy. This allows the attacker to set up another attack and dive again. Surprise is often a key element in this type of attack, and the attackers will often hide in the sun or clouds, stalking their opponents until a good opportunity is presented. A high-side guns pass is a very effective tactic against a more maneuverable opponent, where the turning battle of a dogfight is best avoided.

=== Immelmann ===
Schematic view of an Immelmann turn: 1. Level flight; 2. Half loop; 3. 180° roll to bring aircraft back level

An Immelmann trades airspeed for altitude during a 180 degree change in direction. The aircraft performs the first half of a loop, and when completely inverted, rolls to the upright position. The Immelmann is a good offensive maneuver for setting up a high-side guns pass against a lower altitude, slow moving opponent, going in an opposite direction. However, an Immelmann is a poor defensive maneuver, turning the defender into a slow moving target.

=== Split S ===
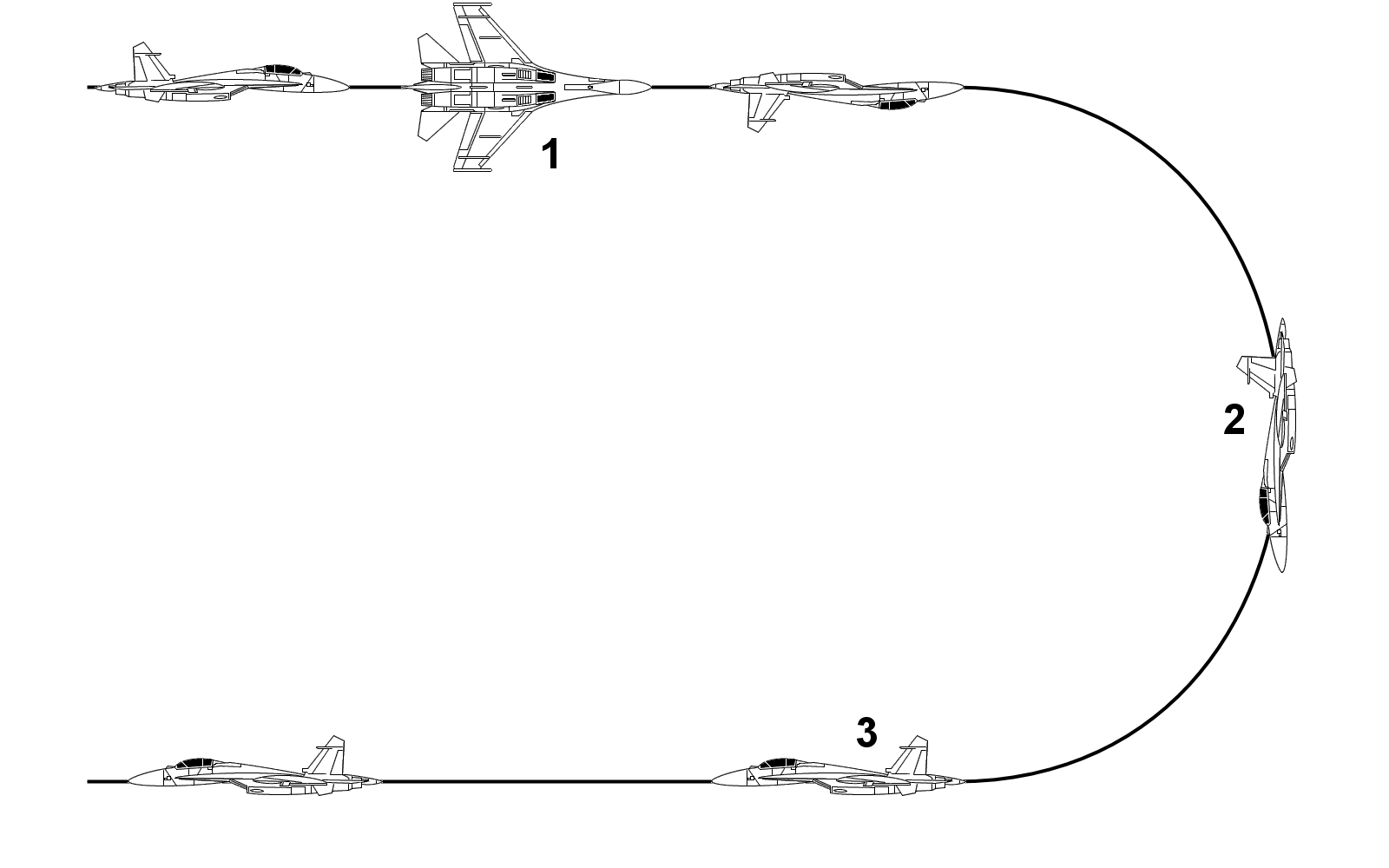
Schematic view of a split S: 1. 180° roll; 2. Half loop; 3. Exit level

The opposite of an Immelmann is the split S. This maneuver consists of rolling inverted and pulling back on the stick, diving the aircraft into a half loop, which changes the aircraft's direction 180 degrees. The split S is rarely a viable option in combat, as it depletes kinetic energy in a turn and potential energy in a dive. It is most often used to set up a high-side guns pass against a lower but fast moving opponent that is traveling in the opposite direction. Also, the split S is sometimes used as a disengagement tactic.

=== Pitchback ===
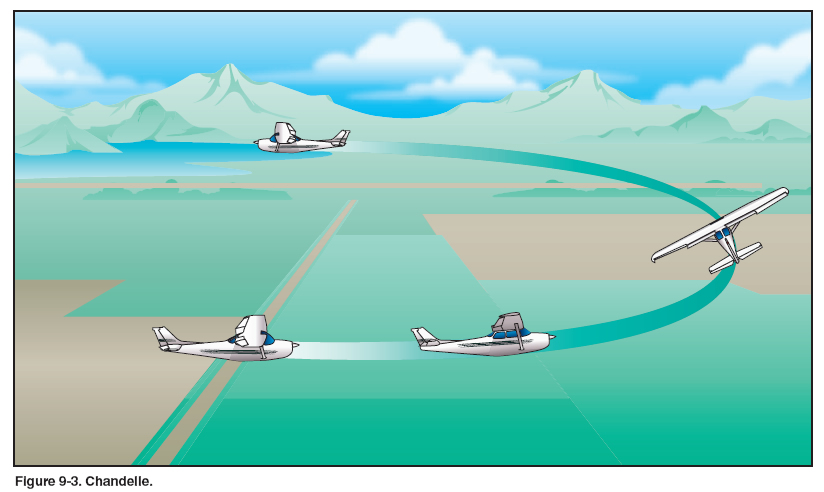
Chandelle from the FAA Publication FAA-H-8083-3A (Airplane Flying Handbook)

A pitchback, also called a Chandelle, is an Immelmann that is executed in some plane other than the vertical. Basically just a pitch turn, the fighter will be at some angle of bank before performing the half loop and roll. Unlike the Immelmann, a pitchback depletes less kinetic energy and is harder for an adversary to track.

=== Wingover ===
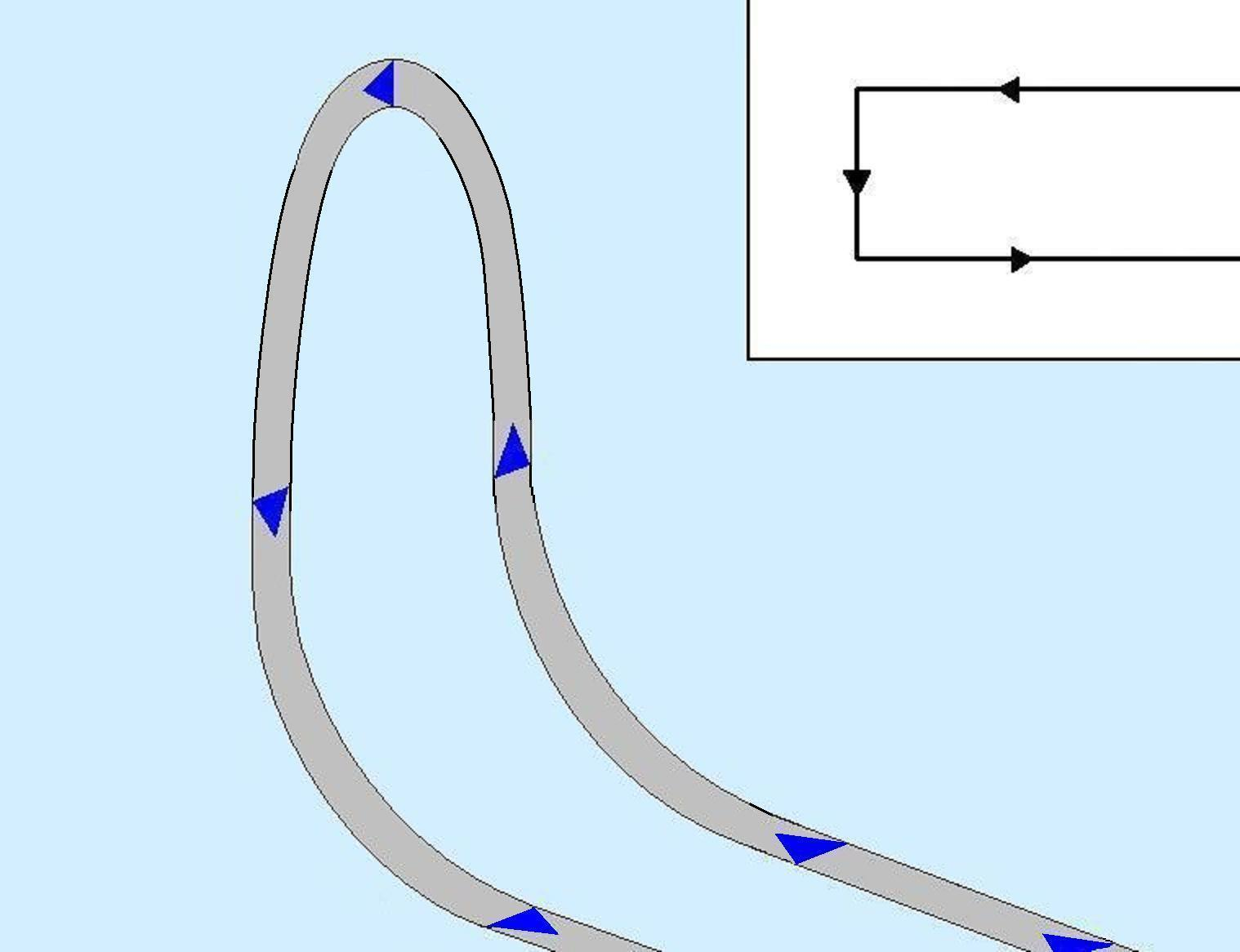
Diagram of a basic wingover

A wingover is a maneuver used to provide a fast, 180 degree turn with a very small turn radius. It consists of a quarter loop into a vertical climb, letting the speed fall as altitude increases, and then a flat-turn over the top, diving to complete a quarter loop at the original altitude, but going in the opposite direction. The wingover is similar to a stall turn, but the fighter does not actually stall, which makes the wingover more difficult for an enemy to track. Unlike an Immelmann or a split-s, the wingover also manages energy by conserving both airspeed and altitude.

=== Low Yo-Yo ===
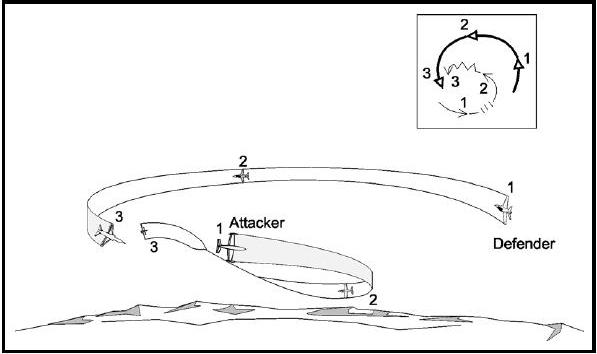
Low Yo-Yo.

The low Yo-Yo is one of the most useful maneuvers, which sacrifices altitude for an instantaneous increase in speed. This maneuver is accomplished by rolling with the nose low into the turn, and dropping into a steeper slice turn. By utilizing some energy that was stored in the vertical plane, the attacker can quickly decrease range and improve the angle of the attack, literally cutting the corner on the opponent's turn. The pilot then pulls back on the stick, climbing back to the defender's height. This helps slow the aircraft and prevents an overshoot, while placing the energy back into altitude. A defender spotting this maneuver may try to take advantage of the increase in AOT by tightening the turn in order to force an overshoot. The low Yo-Yo is often followed by a high Yo-Yo, to help prevent an overshoot, or several small low Yo-Yos can be used instead of one large maneuver.

=== High Yo-Yo ===
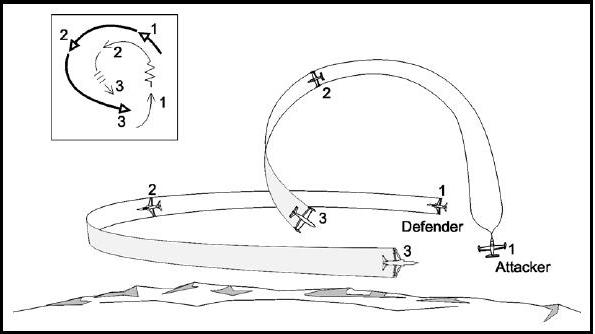
High Yo-Yo

The high Yo-Yo is a very effective maneuver, and very difficult to counter. The maneuver is used to slow the approach of the fast moving attacker while conserving the airspeed energy. The maneuver is performed by reducing the angle at which the aircraft is banking during a turn, and pulling back on the stick, bringing the fighter up into a new plane of travel. The attacker then rolls into a steeper pitch turn, climbing above the defender. The trade-off between airspeed and altitude provides the fighter with a burst of increased maneuverability. This allows the attacker to make a smaller turn, correcting an overshoot, and to pull in behind the defender. Then, by returning to the defender's plane, the attacker restores the lost speed while maintaining energy.

=== Lag displacement roll ===
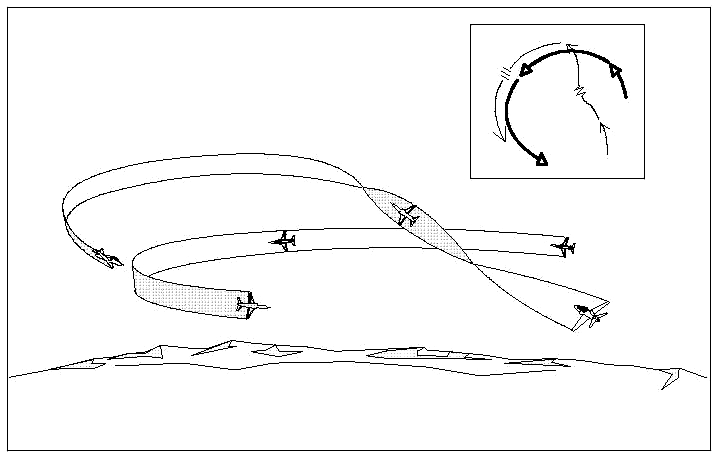
Lag roll

A lag displacement roll, also called a "lag roll", is a maneuver used to reduce the angle off tail by bringing the attacker from lead pursuit to pure, or even lag pursuit. The maneuver is performed by rolling up and away from the turn, then, when the aircraft's lift vector is aligned with the defender, pulling back on the stick, bringing the fighter back into the turn. This maneuver helps prevent an overshoot caused by the high AOT of lead pursuit, and can also be used to increase the distance between aircraft.

=== High Yo-Yo defense ===
To prevent an overshoot, an attacker in lead pursuit may need to correct with an out-of-plane maneuver. If the lateral separation is excessively high, the attacker will probably use a displacement roll. However, if the lateral separation is low enough, the attacker will likely use a high Yo-Yo. The high Yo-Yo defense can be a good tactic in these situations. The maneuver is performed when the attacker rolls away from the turn to begin the correction. The defender will begin to relax the turn by easing off of the stick, called "unloading", which causes both turn radius and speed to increase, restoring the fighter's lost energy. If the defender maintains the same angle of bank, the subtle maneuver will be very difficult for the attacker to spot. When the attacker completes the out-of-plane maneuver, the defending fighter has regained some of its energy. This allows the defender to, once again, turn harder into the attack, regaining an angular advantage over the higher energy attacker. If the attacker is surprised by the maneuver, a high Yo-Yo defense might even cause an overshoot.

=== Unloaded extension ===
An unloaded extension is a disengagement (bug out) maneuver often used by the pilot whenever there is enough energy and separation. The maneuver consists of slipping into a steep, straight dive and applying full thrust. Removing all g-force load from the aircraft causes it to accelerate at a very high rate, allowing the pilot to vastly increase range, or "extend", and possibly to escape.

If a defender breaks suddenly, causing the attacker to overshoot, the defender may reverse the turn and move in behind the attacker. An unloaded extension is usually the attacker's best option, using the energy advantage to escape the slower moving defender. An unloaded extension is usually not recommended against a higher energy opponent. However, in many circumstances, such as when an attacker performs a high Yo-Yo too steeply, an unloaded extension is a viable option for the defender.

=== Scissors ===
The scissors are a series of turn reversals and flight path overshoots intended to slow the relative forward motion (downrange travel) of the aircraft in an attempt to either force a dangerous overshoot, on the part of the defender, or prevent a dangerous overshoot on the attacker's part. The defender's goal is to stay out of phase with the attacker, trying to prevent a guns solution, while the attacker tries to get in phase with the defender. The advantage usually goes to the more maneuverable aircraft. There are two types of scissor maneuvers, called flat scissors and rolling scissors.

==== Flat scissors ====
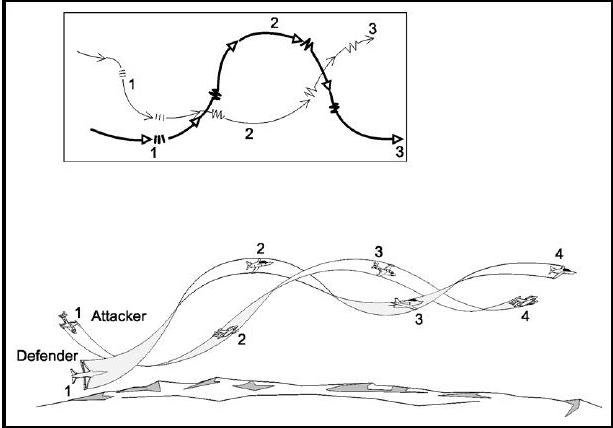
Flat scissors

Flat scissors, also called horizontal scissors, usually occur after a low-speed overshoot in a horizontal direction. The defender reverses the turn, attempting to force the attacker to fly out in front and to spoil aim. The attacker then reverses, trying to remain behind the defender, and the two aircraft begin a weaving flight pattern.

==== Rolling scissors ====
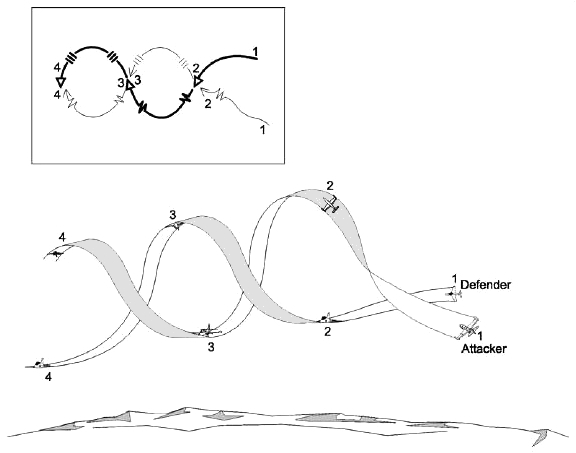
Rolling scissors

Rolling scissors, also called vertical scissors, tend to happen after a high-speed overshoot from above. The defender reverses into a vertical climb and into a barrel roll over the top, forcing the attacker to attempt to follow. The advantage lies in the aircraft that can pull its nose through the top or bottom of the turn faster. In battles with aircraft that have a thrust-to-weight ratio of less than one the aircraft will quickly lose altitude, and crashing into the ground becomes a possibility. According to author Mike Spick, "Disengagement from a vertical rolling scissors is best made with a split-s and a lot of hope."

=== Guns defense ===
Guns defense maneuvering, or "guns-D", is the last resort for a defender that fails to outmaneuver the attacker. Guns-D is a series of random changes in the defenders flight path, intended to spoil the attacker's aim by presenting a constantly shifting target, and, hopefully, to maneuver out of the bullet stream (hose). It consists of arbitrary speed changes, yaws, skids, slips, pitch-ups, and rolls, and is often referred to as "jinking". Because the attacker must aim ahead of the opponent, the primary goal in guns-D is to disorient the attacker's aim by keeping the nose pointed in a different direction than the velocity vector (the direction of travel), and is very effective at preventing the attacker from achieving a suitable guns solution. However, guns-D maneuvering still leaves the defender susceptible to stray bullets and "lucky shot" hits, and does little to improve the relative positional situation. Thus, it is only employed as a last-ditch defensive effort when nothing else works.

=== High-g barrel roll ===
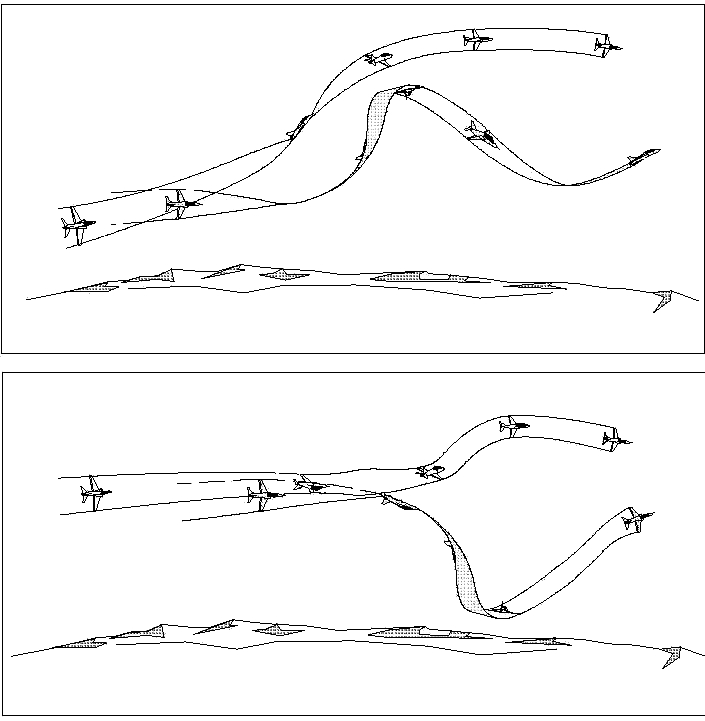
A high g barrel roll can be performed over-the-top or underneath.

A high-g barrel roll is a combination of a loop and a snap roll. A high g barrel roll is a last-ditch defensive maneuver, performed when the attacker has achieved a suitable guns solution, in order to cause an overshoot. The high-g barrel roll is a violent maneuver which is performed much more aggressively than a normal barrel roll. Range is critical to the success of the roll, and the defender will usually turn very hard, or employ other measures to draw the opponent very close before performing the roll. The roll is executed by applying hard back-stick pressure, creating the high g-forces, and adding hard rudder input to assist the ailerons in rolling the fighter. A high-g barrel roll can be performed "over-the-top", or it can be performed "underneath", which is accomplished by rolling upside-down and beginning the maneuver from the inverted position. The high-g barrel roll is an energy-depleting maneuver that rarely causes the attacker to fly out in front, but usually will result in a flight path overshoot, a flat scissors, or, at the very least, will temporarily disrupt the attacker's aim.

=== Defensive spiral ===
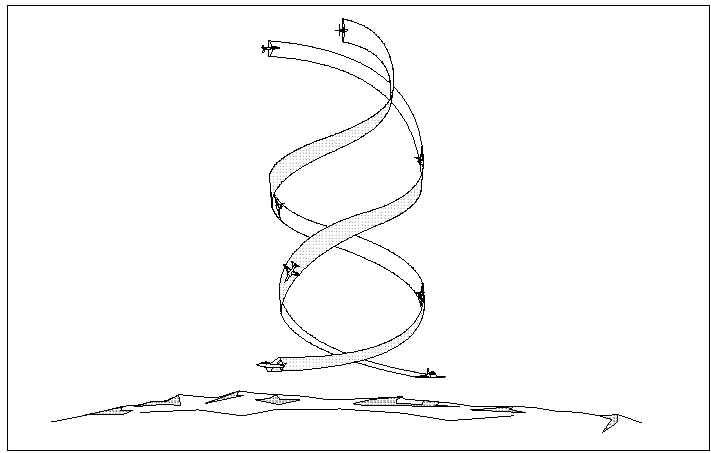
Defensive spiral

A defender that fails to outmaneuver the attacker can quickly become "out of airspeed and ideas". The defensive spiral is a maneuver used by the defender when the kinetic energy becomes depleted and other last-ditch maneuvers can not successfully be implemented. The maneuver consists of dropping the nose low during the turn and going into a spiral dive, using gravity to supply the energy needed to continue evasive action. The defensive spiral becomes a rolling scissors performed straight down. The defender's goal is to stay out of phase with the attacker until the ground is dangerously close. The advantage usually goes to the aircraft that can decelerate quicker, and the defender will often cut the power and extend the speedbrakes in an effort to force an overshoot. If this attempt is unsuccessful, the defender will usually pull out of the dive at the last possible second, hoping to cause the attacker to crash into the ground.

== See also ==
- Index of aviation articles
