= Wingover =

Aerobatic / combat maneuver

A wingover (also called a wing-over-wing, crop-duster turn or box-canyon turn) is an aerobatic maneuver in which an airplane makes a steep climb, followed by a vertical flat-turn (the plane turns to its side, without rolling, similar to the way a car turns). The maneuver ends with a short dive as the plane gently levels out, flying in the opposite direction from which the maneuver began.

== Sequence and use ==
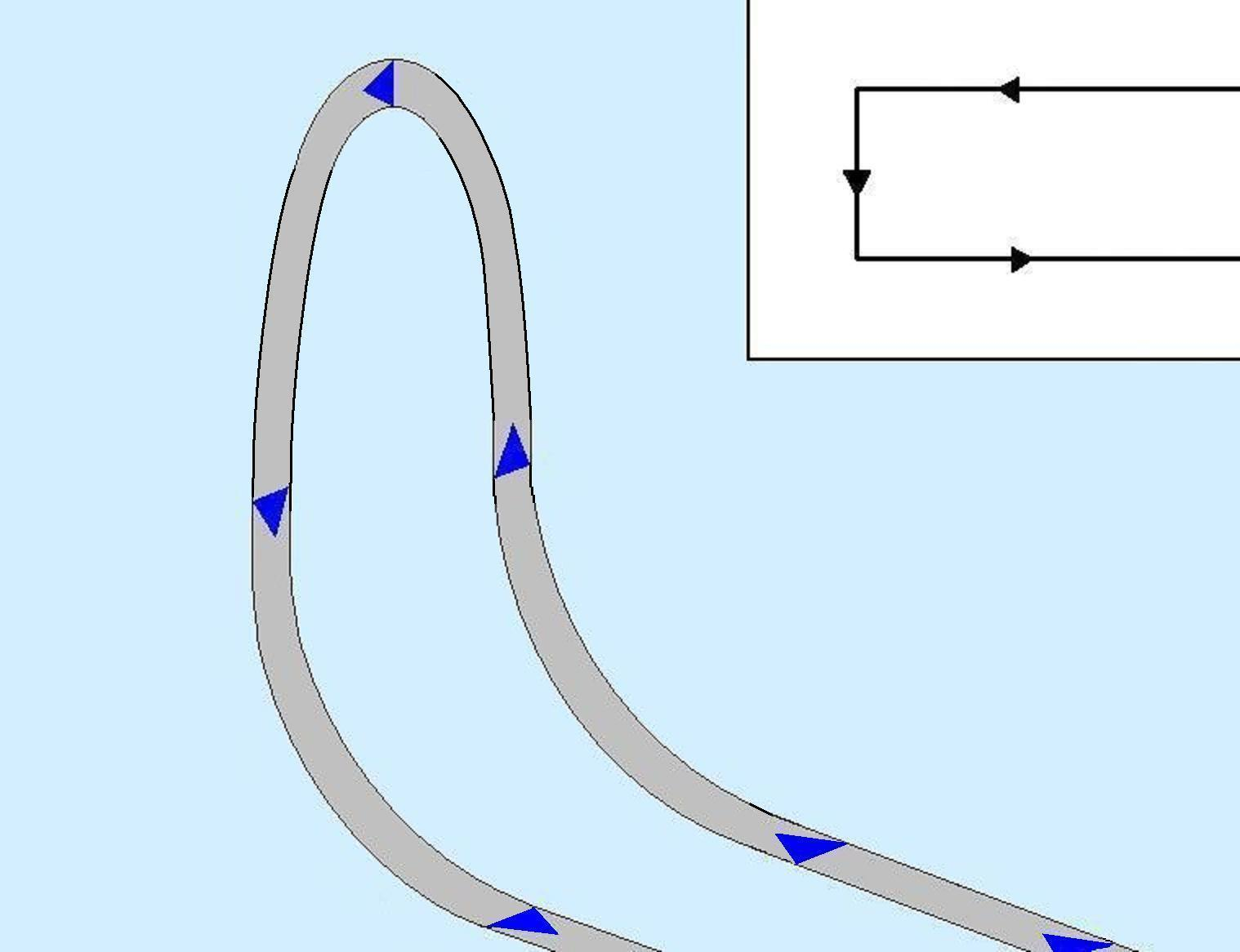
Diagram of a basic wingover

The aircraft makes a tight, 180-degree change in heading while covering minimum horizontal distance. The maneuver begins by making roughly a quarter loop, bringing the plane up into a vertical or near-vertical climb, allowing the airspeed to drop. Before the airplane stalls (begins to fall) the pilot applies hard rudder input, bringing the plane into a sweeping, vertical flat-turn, during which the wing swings over the top of the turn toward the direction of the nose. Both the lowered airspeed and gravity provide assistance with the turn, similar to a stall turn (hammerhead turn), except the plane never actually stalls. Instead, as the speed decreases, the plane makes a gentle, 180-degree flat-turn over the top of the climb, then dives to the original altitude along a parallel flightpath, completing a quarter loop to return to level flight at the original speed.

The wingover is an energy-management maneuver. It is often used in dogfighting as an alternative to the split S, when a fast turn-around is needed but a loss in altitude and a change in airspeed is not. Because the aircraft does not roll, it also has the advantage of keeping the cockpit facing the same direction during the turn, allowing the pilot to maintain sight of the opponent. Wingover-type maneuvers are often used to abruptly end other climbing maneuvers, like chandelles and high Yo-Yos, "kicking over" the nose when the enemy shows signs of falling or trying to dive away. One such maneuver was described by P-47 Thunderbolt pilot Major Robert S. Johnson, in an account of aerial combat during World War II:

Habit brought my head swiveling around to look behind me. I was just in time to see a Focke-Wulf bouncing, nose twinkling from the .30 calibers. My left hand slammed forward on the throttle, my right hand hauled back on the stick, my heart went to the top of my head and the Thunderbolt leapt upward. I racked the Jug into a tight left climbing turn, staying just above and in front of the pursuing Focke-Wulf.... To get any strikes on me, the [German] had to turn inside me, and then haul his nose up steeply to place the bullets ahead of me. The Focke-Wulf just didn't have it. At 8,000 feet he stalled out while the Thunderbolt roared smoothly; I kicked over into a roll and locked onto his tail."

The wingover is also a common maneuver during air shows and aerobatic competitions.

== Execution ==
A wingover is typically executed from level flight or a slight bank in the direction of the turn. Lower-powered aircraft may begin the maneuver from a shallow dive, to increase airspeed. The pilot then pulls back on the stick bringing the plane up into a steep climb, typically not exceeding 2 to 3 g. When the plane reaches a proper attitude (nose position above the horizon), which may be between 60 and 90 degrees, or even past vertical as much as 120 degrees, the pilot relaxes the elevator input, allowing the plane to lose airspeed as it climbs in altitude. Slight rudder will usually be applied at this time to increase the bank. In a vertical climb, the term "bank" refers to the angle of the horizon to the wingline (an imaginary line running through the center of the aircraft at the 3:00 and 9:00 positions, parallel to the wings), and the increased bank causes the fuselage to angle sideways and the nose to start dropping to one side. When performing the maneuver at transonic or supersonic speeds, extra help may be needed in slowing the airspeed, such as deploying the speedbrakes.

When the airspeed is slow enough, the pilot applies hard rudder input with the pedals, bringing the plane into a sweeping flat-turn, as if pivoting on the lower wingtip while the upper wing cartwheels over the top. Because one wing is moving faster than the other, it will have a tendency to impart some roll onto the aircraft, so slight aileron will usually need to be applied during the turn to keep the plane from rolling. When the plane reaches a nose-down bank and attitude, the pilot releases rudder and dives, pulling back on the stick to level the plane out at the original altitude.

== See also ==
- Hineri-komi
