= Air combat manoeuvring =

Fighter aircraft movement, dogfighting

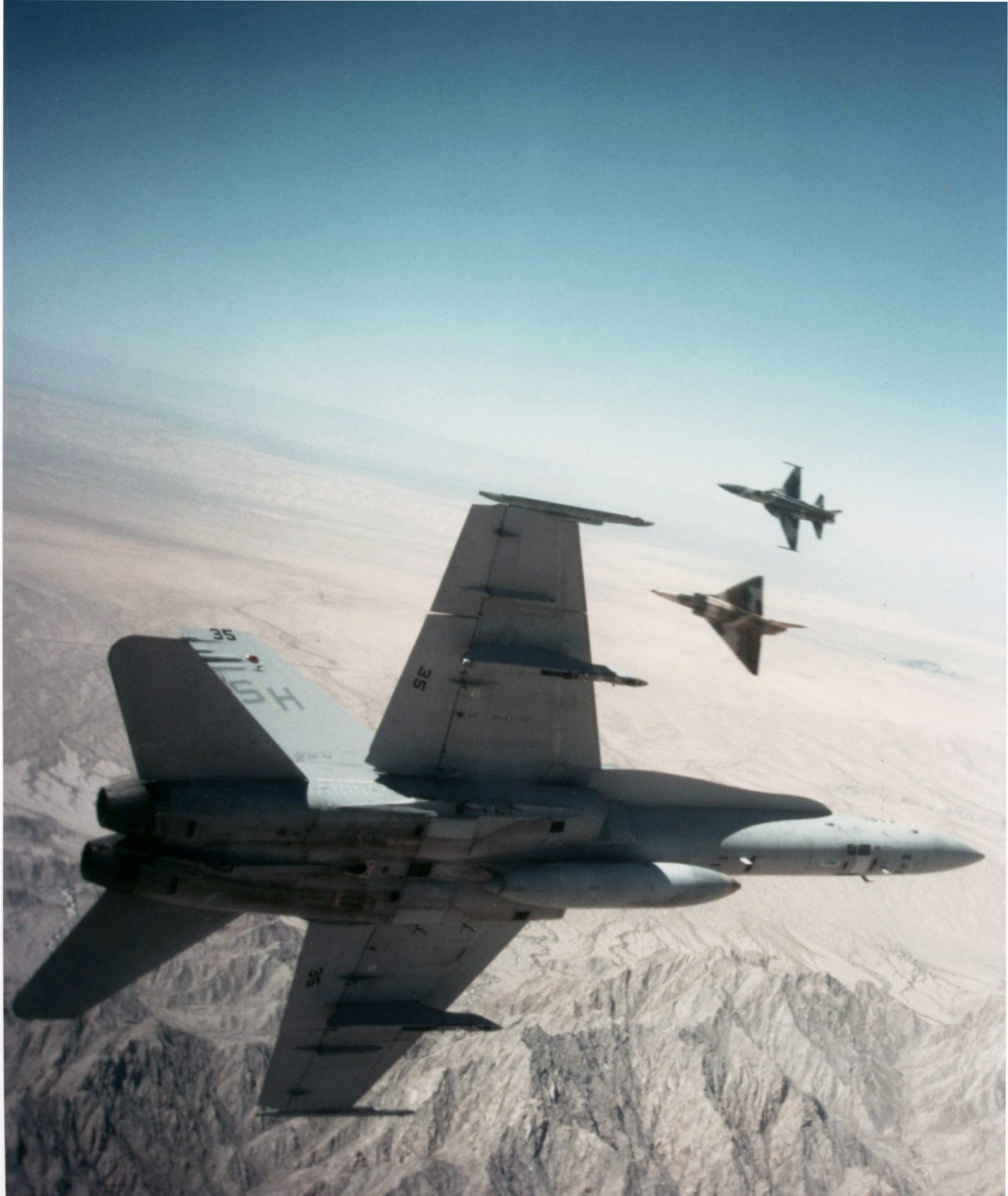
A United States Marine Corps F/A-18A Hornet engaged in air combat maneuvering training with IAI Kfir and F-5E Tiger II aggressors near Marine Corps Air Station Yuma in 1989

Air combat manoeuvring (ACM) is the tactic of moving, turning, and situating one's fighter aircraft in order to attain a position from which an attack can be made on another aircraft. Commonly associated with dogfighting, air combat manoeuvres rely on offensive and defensive basic fighter manoeuvring (BFM) to gain an advantage over an aerial opponent.

== Historical overview ==
Military aviation originated in World War I when aircraft were initially used to spot enemy troop concentrations, field gun positions, and movements. Early aerial combat consisted of aviators shooting at one another with hand-held weapons. The first recorded aircraft to be shot down by another aircraft, which occurred on October 5, 1914, was a German Aviatik B.I. The pilot, Feldwebel Wilhelm Schlichting, was shot with a carbine wielded by observer Louis Quenault, who was riding in a French Voisin III piloted by Sergeant Joseph Frantz. The need to stop reconnaissance that was being conducted by enemy aircraft rapidly led to the development of fighter planes, a class of aircraft designed specifically to destroy other aircraft.

Fixed, forward-firing guns were found to be the most effective armament for a majority of World War I era fighter planes, but it was nearly impossible to fire them through the spinning propeller of one's own aircraft without destroying one's own plane. Roland Garros, working with Morane Saulnier Aéroplanes, was the first to solve this problem by attaching steel deflector wedges to the propeller. He achieved three kills but was shot down by ground fire and landed behind German lines. Anthony Fokker inspected the plane's wreckage and learned to improve the design by connecting the firing mechanism of the gun to the timing of the engine, thus allowing the gun to fire through the propeller without making contact with the propeller. As technology rapidly advanced, new and young aviators began defining the realm of air-to-air combat, such as Max Immelmann, Oswald Boelcke, and Lanoe Hawker. One of the greatest of these "ace pilots" of World War I, Manfred von Richthofen (the Red Baron), wrote in his book The Red Fighter Pilot, "The great thing in air fighting is that the decisive factor does not lie in trick flying but solely in the personal ability and energy of the aviator. A flying man may be able to loop and do all the stunts imaginable and yet he may not succeed in shooting down a single enemy."

F-4 Air Combat Tactics (1968) De-classified official USAF aerial combat engagement pilot training film reel.

Pilots soon learned to achieve a firing position (while avoiding the threat of enemy guns) by manoeuvring themselves behind an enemy aircraft; this is known as getting onto an aircraft's "six o'clock" or onto their "tail", plus a wide variety of other terms, usually coined by air crew. This type of combat became known as dogfighting. Oswald Boelcke, a German fighter ace during World War I, was the first to publish the basic rules for aerial combat manoeuvring in 1916, known as the Dicta Boelcke. He advised pilots to attack from the direction of the sun (toward which the defending pilot could not see), or to fly at a higher altitude than the opponent. Most of these rules are still as valuable today as they were a century ago.

Today's air combat is much more complicated than that of older times, as air-to-air missiles, radar, and automatic cannons capable of high rates of fire are used on nearly all modern fighter aircraft. New and additional types of manoeuvres have emerged, intending to break radar lock by minimizing the Doppler signature of one's own aircraft ("keeping the enemy at 3 or 9 o'clock"), or to exhaust the kinetic energy of an incoming missile (by changing the aircraft's course from side to side, the missile, not flying directly at target but trying to forestall it, will make sharper turns and will eventually have to fly a longer path). However, close-range fighting with infrared guided missiles and aircraft cannons still obeys the same general rules laid down in the skies over Europe in the early 20th century. The master rule is still the same: get on the opponent's rear without allowing them to do the same.

Close-range combat tactics vary considerably according to the type of aircraft being used and the number of aircraft involved.

== Tactics ==
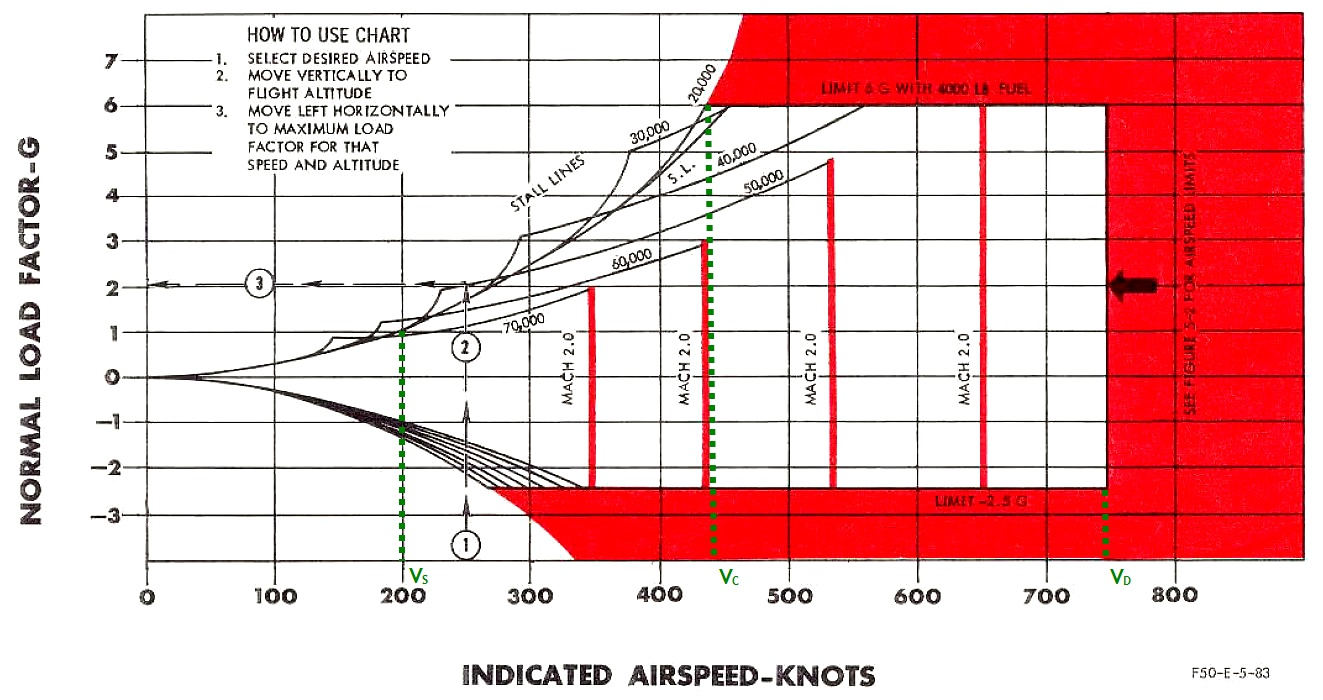
A flight envelope diagram showing V_{S} (stall speed at 1G), V_{C} (corner speed) and V_{D} (dive speed)

There are five things a pilot must remain aware of when contemplating aerial engagement; of these, seeing and keeping sight of one's opponent are the most important. In Southeast Asia, over 85 percent of all kills are attributed to the attacker spotting and shooting the defender without ever being seen. Structural limitations of the attacking and defending fighters must be taken into account, such as thrust-to-weight ratio, wing loading, and the "corner speed" (the maximum or minimum speed at which the aircraft can attain the best turning performance). Variable limitations must also be considered, such as turn radius, turn rate and the specific energy of the aircraft. Position of aircraft must quickly be assessed, including direction, angle off tail (the angle between flight paths), and closing speed. Also, the pilot must be aware of his wingman's position and maintain good communication.

A pilot in combat attempts to conserve his aircraft's energy through carefully timed and executed manoeuvres. By using such manoeuvres, a pilot will often make trade offs between the fighter's potential energy (altitude) and kinetic energy (airspeed), to maintain the energy-to-weight ratio of the aircraft, or the "specific energy". A manoeuvre such as the "low yo-yo" trades altitude for airspeed to close on an enemy and to decrease turn radius. The opposite manoeuvre, a "high yo-yo", trades speed for height, literally storing energy in "the altitude bank", which allows a fast moving attacker to slow his closing speed.

An attacker is confronted with three possible ways to pursue an enemy, all of which are vital during chase. "Lag pursuit" happens in a turn when the nose of the attacker's aircraft points behind an enemy's tail. Lag pursuit allows an attacker to increase or maintain range without overshooting. "Lead pursuit" in a turn occurs when the nose of the attacking aircraft points ahead of the enemy. Lead pursuit is used to decrease the distance between aircraft, and during gun attacks when the cannons must be aimed, not at where the defender is, but where he will be when the bullets get there. "Pure pursuit" happens when the nose of the attacker points directly at the defender. Pure pursuit is when most missiles will be fired, and is the hardest position to maintain. These are known as pursuit curves.

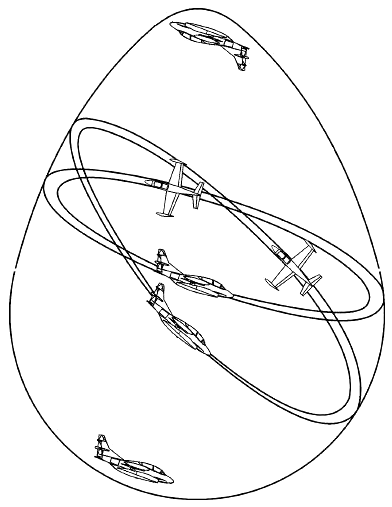
The tactical egg shows the effects of gravity on manoeuvring

The turning battle of a dogfight can be executed in an infinite number of geometric planes. Pilots are encouraged to keep their manoeuvres out of the strictly vertical and horizontal planes, but to instead use the limitless number of oblique planes, which is much harder for an adversary to track. This infinite number of planes around a fixed point about which the aircraft turns is termed the "post and bubble". A fighter that can maintain position between an aircraft and its imaginary post cannot be attacked by that aircraft. The imaginary bubble, however, is misshapen by gravity, causing turns to be much tighter and slower at the top, and wider and faster at the bottom, and is sometimes referred to as a "tactical egg".

The manoeuvres employed by the attacker can also be used by the defender to evade, or gain a tactical advantage over his opponent. Other components may also be employed to manoeuvre the aircraft, such as yaw, drag, lift, and thrust vectors. A key factor in all battles is that of "nose-tail separation". While getting close enough to fire a weapon, an attacker must keep his aircraft's nose far enough away from the tail of the defender to be able to get a good aim, and to prevent an overshoot. The defender, likewise, will use every manoeuvre available to encourage an overshoot, trying to change his own role to that of attacker.

== Example manoeuvring ==
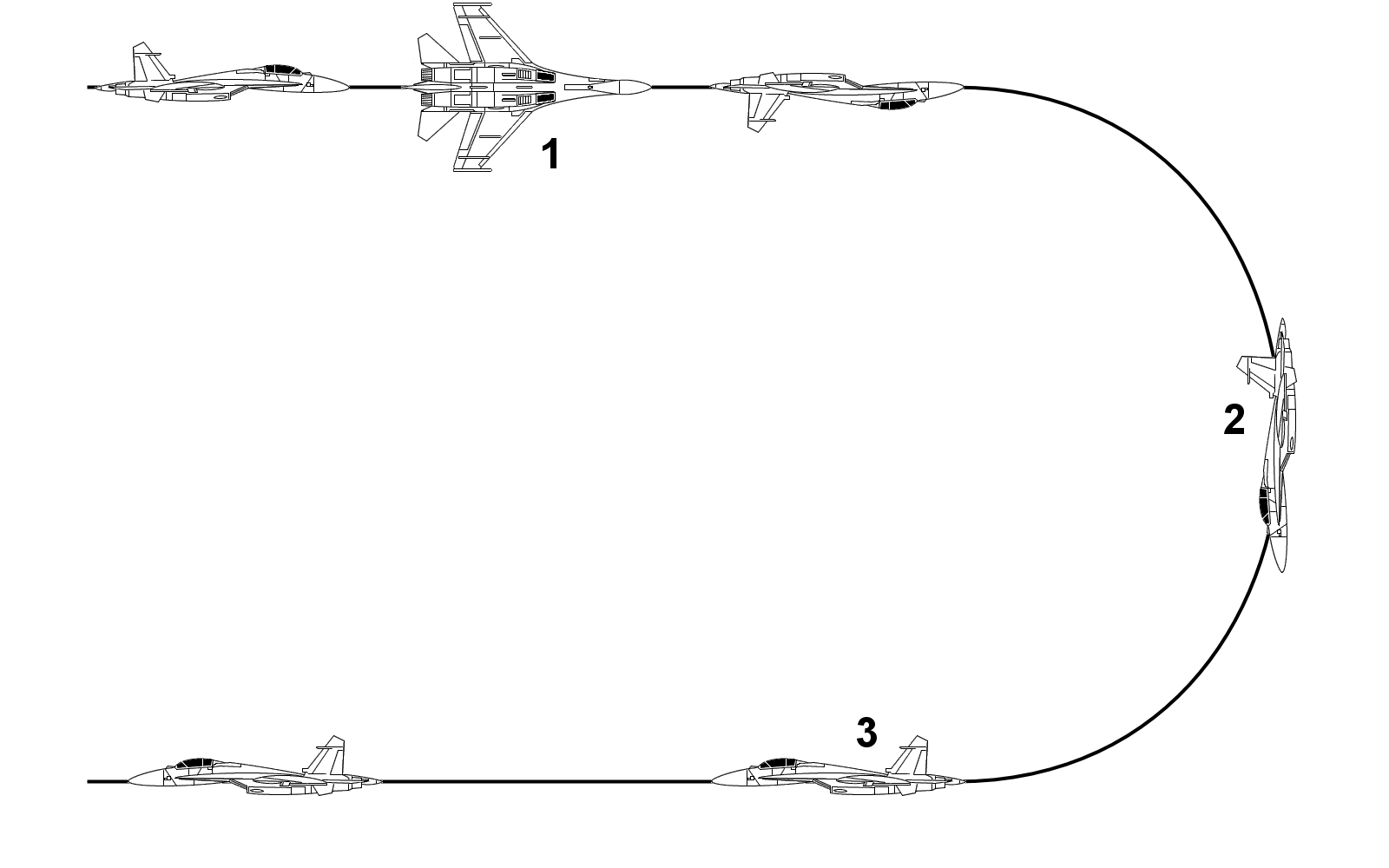
Schematic view of a split S: 1. 180° roll; 2. Half loop; 3. Exit level

- Basic:
  - Combat spread
  - Pitchback
  - Bell Tailslide
  - Split S
  - Immelmann turn
  - Thach Weave
  - Scissors
  - Chandelle

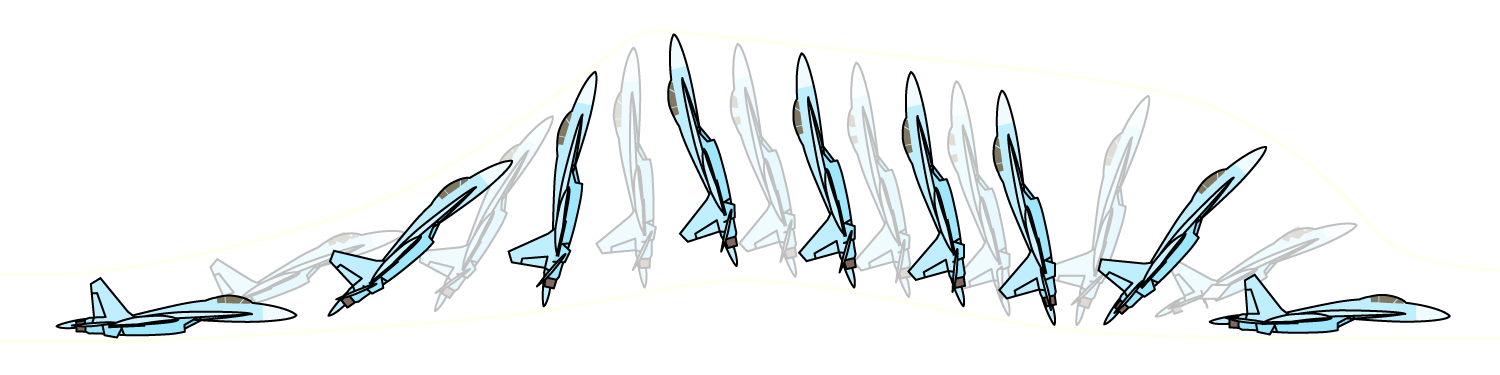
The cobra maneuver as performed by the Su-27 Flanker

- Complex:
  - High Yo-Yo
  - Low Yo-Yo
  - Lag Displacement Roll (High-G Barrel Roll)
  - Cobra Maneuver
  - Cobra Turn
  - Kulbit
  - Herbst manoeuvre
  - Hineri-komi

== See also ==
- Index of aviation articles
- Basic fighter maneuvers
- Energy–maneuverability theory
