= Immelmann turn =

Aerial maneuver

Modern Immelmann

The term Immelmann turn, named after German World War I Eindecker fighter ace Leutnant Max Immelmann, refers to two different aircraft maneuvers. In World War I aerial combat, an Immelmann turn was a maneuver used after an attack on another aircraft to reposition the attacking aircraft for another attack. In modern aerobatics, an Immelmann turn (also known as a roll-off-the-top, or simply an Immelmann) is an aerobatic maneuver that results in level flight in the opposite direction at a higher altitude.

== Historical combat maneuver ==
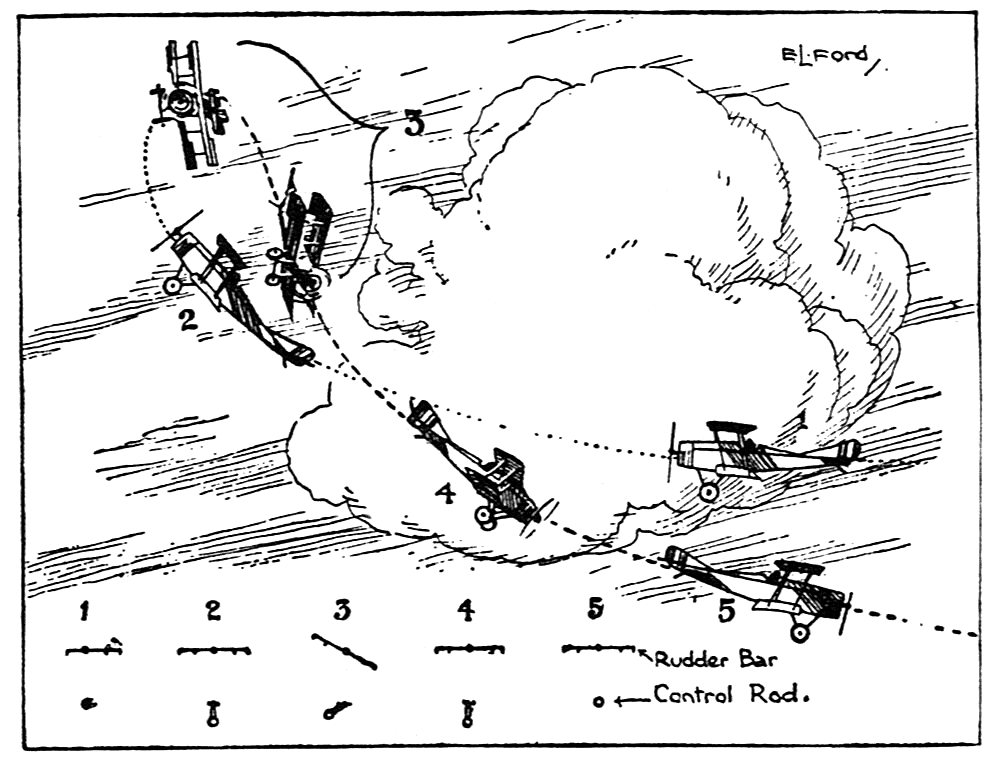
Illustration of the historical maneuver from a 1918 flight manual

In World War I aerial combat, an Immelmann turn was a maneuver used after an attack on another aircraft to reposition the attacking aircraft for another attack.

After making a high-speed diving attack on an enemy, the attacker would then climb back up past the enemy aircraft, and just short of the stall, apply full rudder to yaw his aircraft around. This put his aircraft facing down at the enemy aircraft, making another high-speed diving pass possible. This is a difficult maneuver to perform properly, as it involves precise control of the aircraft at low speed. With practice and proper use of all of the fighter's controls, the maneuver could be used to reposition the attacking aircraft to dive back down in any direction desired.

Max Immelmann's Fokker Eindecker relied on relatively ineffectual wing warping for rolling, but had a large moveable vertical stabiliser, meaning turns were initiated and mostly controlled with the rudder. His innovation was in realising that this limitation in his aircraft could be turned to his advantage, whipping it over at the top of a zoom climb rather than attempting to make a conventional banked turn, which would have been too slow and cumbersome to provide an advantage in air combat.

In modern aerobatics, this maneuver, if executed pre-stall with a non-zero turning radius at the top of the climb, is known as a wingover. If the rudder turn is executed right at the initiation of the stall, the resulting yaw occurs around a point within the aircraft's wingspan and the maneuver is known as a stall turn or "hammerhead".

== Aerobatic maneuver ==
Schematic view of an Immelmann turn: 1. Level flight; 2. Half inside loop; 3. Half roll to bring aircraft back level

The aerobatic Immelmann turn derives its name from the dogfighting tactic, but is a different maneuver than the original, now known as a "wingover" or "hammerhead".

In modern aerobatics, an Immelmann turn (also known as a roll-off-the-top, or simply an Immelmann) is an aerobatic maneuver. Essentially, it comprises an ascending half-loop followed by a half-roll, resulting in level flight in the opposite direction at a higher altitude. It is the opposite of a Split S, which involves a half-roll followed by a half-loop, resulting in level flight in the opposite direction at a lower altitude.

To successfully execute a roll-off-the-top turn, the pilot accelerates to sufficient airspeed to perform a loop in the aircraft. The pilot then pulls the aircraft into a climb, and continues to pull back on the controls as the aircraft climbs. Rudder and ailerons must be used to keep the half-loop straight when viewed from the ground. As the aircraft passes over the point at which the climb was commenced, it should be inverted and a half loop will have been executed. Sufficient airspeed must be maintained to recover without losing altitude, and at the top of the loop the pilot then executes a half-roll to regain normal upright aircraft orientation. As a result, the aircraft is now at a higher altitude and has changed course 180 degrees.

Not all aircraft are capable of (or certified for) this maneuver, due to insufficient engine power, or engine design that precludes inverted flying. This is especially relevant to piston engines that have an open-oil pan. However, when properly flown, the aircraft will maintain positive G throughout the maneuver, allowing success even for an inverted oil system. In fact, a few early aircraft had sufficiently precise roll control to have performed this maneuver properly.

== See also ==
- Chandelle
- Cuban eight
- The Scissors
- Split S
- Thach Weave

== General bibliography ==
- McMinnies, William Gordon; Anderson, Henry Graeme (1997) [1918]. Practical Flying: Complete Course of Flying Instruction. London: Temple Press. ISBN 978-1145564930. OCLC 1380075.
- Wheeler, Allan H. (1963). Building Aeroplanes for "Those Magnificent Men". London: Foulis. ASIN B000WL3QQW.
- Wood, Alan C.; Sutton, Alan (2016). Military Aviation of the First World War. Fonthill Media Press. ISBN 978-1781554227.
