= Split S =

Aerial maneuver

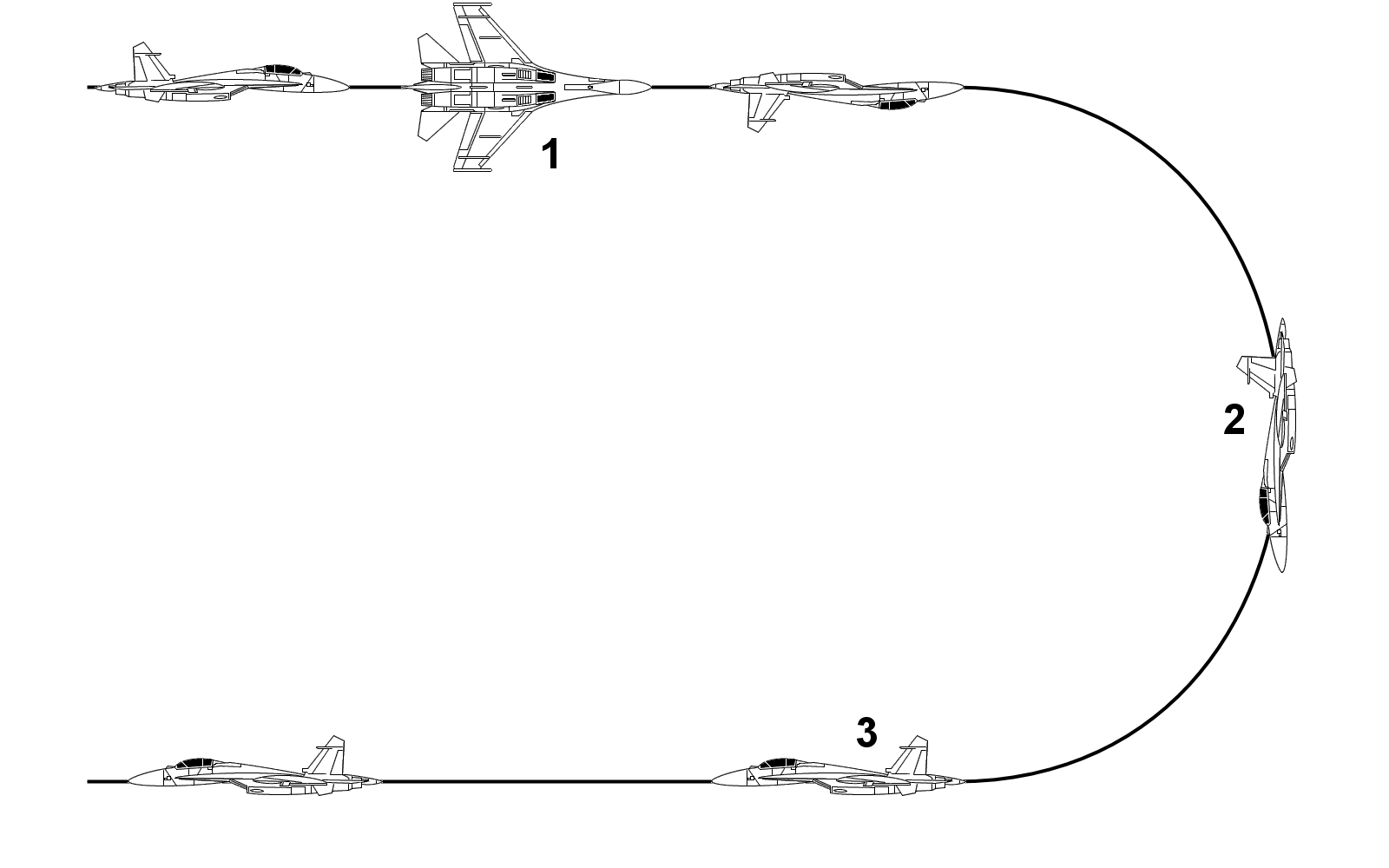
Schematic view of a split S: 1. 180° roll; 2. Half loop; 3. Exit level

Split-S gif animation

The split S is an aerobatic maneuver and an air combat maneuver mostly used to disengage from combat. To execute a split S, the pilot half-rolls their aircraft such that it becomes inverted and executes a descending half-loop, resulting in level flight in the opposite direction at a lower altitude.

== Description ==
The split S is taught to be used in dogfighting when the pilot has the opportunity to withdraw from battle. It can be an effective tactic to prevent an enemy behind (between four o'clock and eight o'clock positions) from gaining a missile lock-on while one is disengaging from a fight.

The split S is contrasted with the Immelmann turn, which is an ascending half-loop that finishes with a half-roll out, resulting in level flight in the opposite direction at a higher altitude. The split S is also called a reversed Immelmann turn and can also be written with a hyphen: split-S. In basic terms, the Immelmann and split S are very similar, both accomplishing the same reversal in course, but the split S exchanges altitude to gain speed, while the Immelmann turn exchanges speed to gain altitude.

U.S. Air Force Thunderbirds Captain Chris Stricklin ejects from his F-16 during an airshow at Mountain Home AFB, Idaho, after he attempts a "split S" maneuver with insufficient altitude

The split S, being a descending maneuver, means that the pilot must ensure that it is started high enough to complete the half-loop; the exact minimum altitude depends on factors like the aircraft's speed, weight and maneuverability, likewise the altitude of the terrain below the plane. Misjudgements can arise from a lack of situational awareness or from an error in reading instruments.

The reasons for starting the split S maneuver from the inverted position include the fact that people tolerate acceleration ("g-force") applied from head to feet several times better than the reverse direction, as much as 9g versus 3g. Most combat aircraft frames are also designed to pull more Gs in their positive aspects (upward to the aircraft), rather than negative (downward to the aircraft). A much tighter maneuver is therefore possible with the half roll.

The split S without the beginning half-roll was a standard maneuver in early World War II by German pilots seeking to evade British fighters. The Merlin engine used in British fighters was carbureted, and the float valves would malfunction under negative g-force leading to reduced power or a stalled engine (the German fighters were not subject to this problem since they used fuel injection). This could be prevented by rolling the aircraft before starting the dive, but doing so took up enough time to give the German pilots an excellent chance of escaping. The beginnings of a solution was provided by "Miss Shilling's orifice", a fuel-flow restriction device, and was finally solved by changing from the original S.U. carburetors to Bendix-Stromberg pressure carburetors, and later to S.U. injection carburetors.

== See also ==
- Chandelle
- Scissors
- Thach weave
