= Isamu Mochizuki =

Japanese WWII flying ace

- 望月 勇
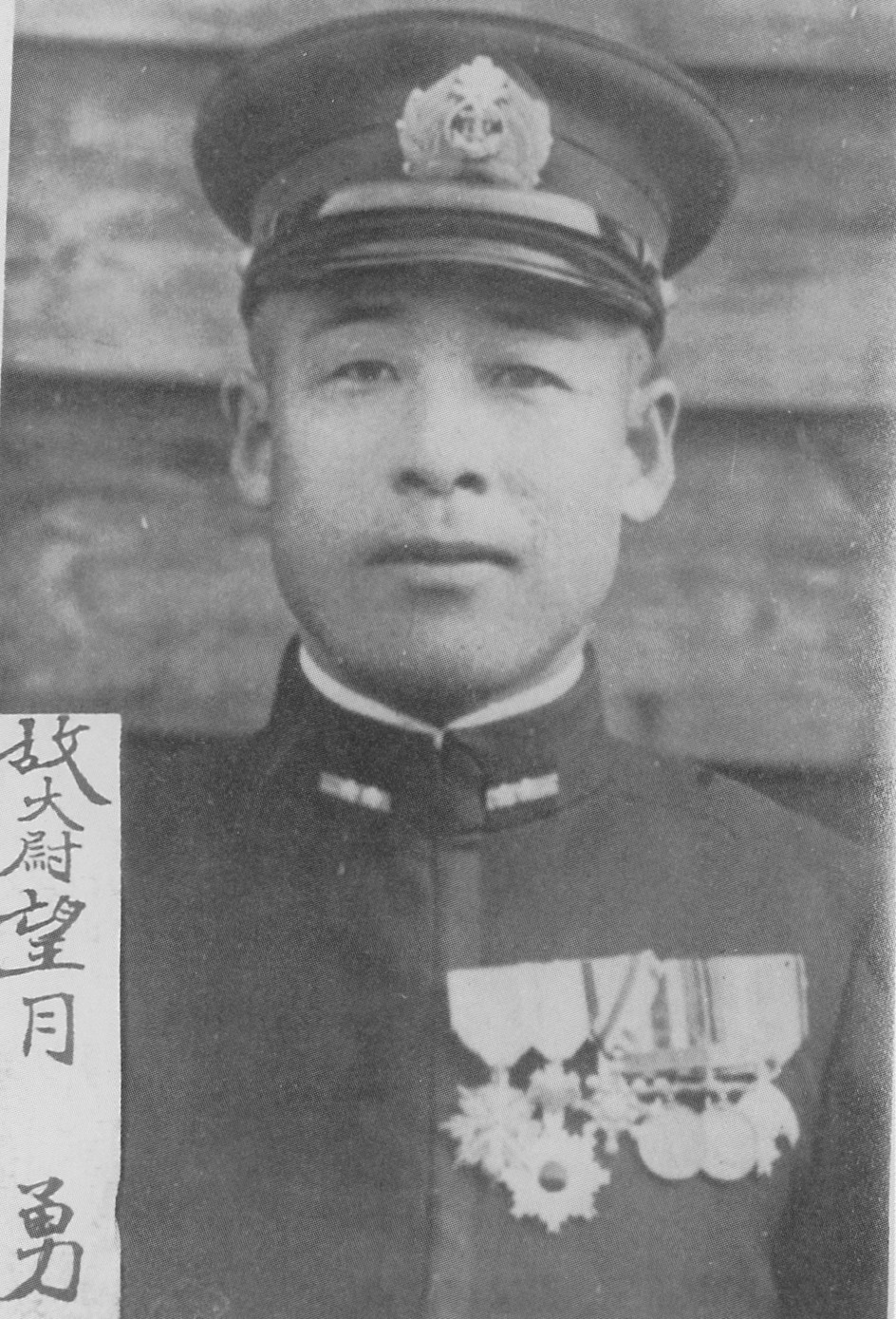
- Mochizuki at the rank of Lieutenant Junior Grade
- Born: 1906; Saga Prefecture, Japan
- Died: February 6, 1944 (aged 37–38); Roi
- Military career
- Allegiance: Empire of Japan
- Branch: Imperial Japanese Navy Air Service (IJN)
- Service years: 1925–1944
- Rank: Lieutenant
- Units: Kaga; Hōshō; Ōmura Air Group; Yokosuka Air Group; 13th Air Group; 281st Air Group
- Conflicts: Second Sino-Japanese War; World War II; Pacific War

Isamu Mochizuki (望月 勇, Mochizuki Isamu; 1906 – 6 February 1944) was an officer and ace fighter pilot in the Imperial Japanese Navy (IJN) during the Second Sino-Japanese War and the Pacific theater of World War II. He was officially credited with destroying ten enemy aircraft over China and the Pacific. He is famous for inventing the hineri-komi half-loop-and-roll technique that was employed in dogfighting by many Japanese fighter pilots.

== Career ==
Mochizuki enlisted in IJN in 1925 and completed its pilot training program in November 1926. He first served on carrier Kaga and then on carrier Hōshō, before he was transferred to a fighter squadron based at Ōmura Naval Air Station in Nagasaki Prefecture on Kyushu. In November 1932, he was transferred to Yokosuka Air Group, which was at the time considered an elite unit consisting of the very best fighter pilots in IJN.

In November 1936, Mochizuki was promoted to Warrant Officer. At the outbreak of Second Sino-Japanese War he was transferred to the 13th Air Group that operated from Shanghai. After six months of combat over China, he was recalled back to Japan. In October 1941 he was promoted to Ensign.

In March 1943, Mochizuki was appointed division leader (buntaichō) in the newly-formed 281st Air Group that was stationed in the Kuril Islands. The same year he was transferred to Roi in the Marshall Islands. After USN carrier strikes destroyed most of the IJN aircraft in the Marshalls, he became stranded on Roi. Mochizuki disappeared and was presumed killed during the American invasion on 6 February 1944.

== "Hineri-komi" maneuver ==
During his four-year stay with Yokosuka Air Group, Mochizuki invented and developed hineri-komi (捻り込み—literal meaning: twist inside) maneuver that allows an aircraft, which is being chased by an enemy, to come at the chaser's tail or to gain an opportunity to take a shot at it. Minoru Genda, who was also part of Yokosuka Air Group at the same time, observed this technique during the training sessions with Mochizuki and helped to formalize it in order to be widely adopted by other IJN pilots in dogfights.

The maneuver starts with a steep climb into a half loop, where the pilot applies (e.g., right) rudder to yaw his aircraft and performs a side slip. At the top of the loop, the aircraft ends up inverted and pointing outside of the loop's vertical plane. At that point, the pilot applies hard reverse (e.g., right) rudder while at the same time applying (e.g., right) aileron to roll the aircraft in the opposite direction of the applied reverse rudder. After the resulting twisting motion, the pilot uses elevator to pull the aircraft up, which brings it into a horizontal flight in the same direction as the loop began.

== See also ==
- Hineri-komi
