= Hineri-komi =

Air combat maneuver used by fighter pilots of Imperial Japanese Navy Air Service

The Hineri-komi (捻り込み—literal meaning: twist inside) was an air combat maneuver widely used by fighter pilots of Imperial Japanese Navy Air Service (IJNAS) through the Second Sino-Japanese War and the Pacific War. It allows an aircraft, which is being pursued by an enemy, to come at the pursuer's tail or to gain an opportunity to take a shot at it.

== History ==
The Hineri-komi maneuver was invented and developed by Isamu Mochizuki in the early 1930s during his four-year stay with Yokosuka Air Group. Minoru Genda, who was also part of Yokosuka Air Group at the same time, observed this technique during the training sessions with Mochizuki and helped to formalize it in order to be widely adopted by other IJNAS pilots in dogfights.

== Execution ==
The maneuver starts with a steep climb into a half loop, where the pilot applies (e.g., right) rudder to yaw his aircraft and performs a side slip. At the top of the loop, the aircraft ends up inverted and pointing outside of the loop's vertical plane. At that point, the pilot applies hard reverse rudder (e.g., left) while at the same time applies (e.g., right) aileron to roll the aircraft in the opposite direction of the applied reverse rudder. After the resulting twisting motion, the pilot uses elevator to pull the aircraft up, which brings it into a horizontal flight in the same direction as the loop began.

== See also ==
- Isamu Mochizuki
- Thach Weave
