= Scissors (aeronautics) =

Aerobatic defensive maneuver

The scissors is an aerial dogfighting maneuver commonly used by military fighter pilots. It is primarily a defensive maneuver, used by an aircraft that is under attack. It consists of a series of short turns towards the attacking aircraft, slowing with each turn, in the hopes of forcing the attacker to overshoot. If performed properly, it can cause the attacking aircraft to move far enough in front to allow the defender to gain an advantage and attack.

The scissors is a close maneuver technique, and as such, is generally only useful when defending against guns or low-performance missiles. It was a major technique from World War I to the Korean War, but is much less common today. The introduction of high-angle missiles makes it much less effective, as the attacker can shoot even when the defender is not in front of them. Modern fighter aircraft also make it difficult to use this technique as they maintain energy much better than earlier designs, thus the maneuvering limits are often the pilot's physical limitations such as G-LOC, not those of the aircraft.

Basic fighter maneuvering theory recognizes two different types of scissors maneuvers; the flat scissors and the rolling scissors.
