= Thach Weave =

Aerial combat tactical formation maneuver

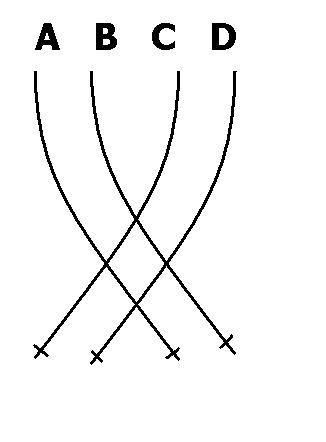
An example of the Thach weave: An enemy following planes A or B is vulnerable to attack from C and D.

The basic Thach weave, executed by two wingmen

The Thach weave (also known as a beam defense position) is an aerial combat tactic that was developed by naval aviator John S. Thach and named by James H. Flatley of the United States Navy soon after the United States' entry into World War II.

It is a tactical formation maneuver in which two or more allied planes wove in regularly intersecting flight paths to lure an enemy into focusing on one plane, while the targeted pilot's wingman would come into position to attack the pursuer.

== Overcoming the Wildcat's disadvantage ==
Thach had heard, from a report published in the 22 September 1941 Fleet Air Tactical Unit Intelligence Bulletin, of the Japanese Mitsubishi Zero's extraordinary maneuverability and rate of climb. Before even experiencing it for himself, he began to devise tactics meant to give the slower-turning American Grumman F4F Wildcat fighters a chance in combat. While based in San Diego, he would spend every evening thinking of different tactics that could overcome the Zero's maneuverability, and would then test them in flight the following day.

Working at night with matchsticks on the table, he eventually came up with what he called "beam defense position", but which soon became known as the "Thach weave". The theory behind the beam attack was predicated on the 2-plane element of the finger-four formation. It was executed either by two fighter aircraft side-by-side or by two pairs of fighters flying together. When an enemy aircraft chose one fighter as his target (the "bait" fighter; his wingman being the "hook"), the two wingmen turned in towards each other. After crossing paths, and once their separation was great enough, they would then repeat the exercise, again turning in towards each other, bringing the enemy plane into the hook's sights. A correctly executed Thach weave (assuming the bait was taken and followed) could negate an attacker's maneuverability advantage long enough to draw them across the gun sights of the "hook" pilot.

Thach called on Ensign Edward "Butch" O'Hare, who led the second section in Thach's division, to test the idea. Thach took off with three other Wildcats in the role of defenders, O'Hare meanwhile led four Wildcats in the role of attackers. The defending aircraft had their throttles wired (to restrict their performance), while the attacking aircraft had their engine power unrestricted – this simulated an attack by superior fighter aircraft.

Trying a series of mock attacks, O'Hare found that in every instance Thach's fighters, despite their power handicap, had either ruined his attack or actually maneuvered into position to shoot back. After landing, O'Hare excitedly congratulated Thach: "Skipper, it really worked. I couldn't make any attack without seeing the nose of one of your airplanes pointed at me."

== In combat ==
Thach carried out the first test of the tactic in combat during the Battle of Midway in June 1942, when a squadron of Zeroes attacked his flight of four Wildcats. Thach's wingman, Ensign R. A. M. Dibb, was attacked by a Japanese pilot and turned towards Thach, who dove under his wingman and fired at the incoming enemy aircraft's belly until its engine ignited. The maneuver soon became standard among US Navy pilots and was adopted by USAAF pilots.

For instance, during the Battle of the Santa Cruz Islands, Flatley's division of four Wildcats encountered Zeros from Jun'yō and deployed Thach weave defensive tactics when they attacked. One of the attackers was Lieutenant Yoshio Shiga, who gave up after he made several runs.

Marines flying Wildcats from Henderson Field on Guadalcanal also adopted the Thach weave. The tactic initially confounded the Japanese Zero pilots flying out of Rabaul. Saburō Sakai, the famous Japanese ace, relates their reaction to the Thach weave when they encountered Guadalcanal Wildcats using it:

For the first time Lt. Commander Tadashi Nakajima encountered what was to become a famous double-team maneuver on the part of the enemy. Two Wildcats jumped on the commander's plane. He had no trouble in getting on the tail of an enemy fighter, but never had a chance to fire before the Grumman's team-mate roared at him from the side. Nakajima was raging when he got back to Rabaul; he had been forced to dive and run for safety.

The maneuver proved so effective that American pilots also used it during the Vietnam War, and it remains a viable dogfighting tactic today.

== Criticism ==
Some pilots criticised the Thach weave. One of the most notable among them was USN ace Swede Vejtasa, who claimed that it is ineffective when faced with experienced attacking pilots. During the training sessions, James Flatley and Vejtasa tested the maneuver with their divisions playing attacking and defending teams. In all attempts the attackers prevailed. According to Vejtasa, he then challenged Thach himself to repeat the exercise with him in order to prove his point, but Thach ignored the challenge.

The Japanese also eventually figured out how to break the Thach weave. For example, during the Battle of the Santa Cruz Islands when USN and IJN strike forces passed each other, Zeros from carrier Zuihō led by Lieutenant Moriyasu Hidaka attacked USN aircraft. In response, Ensigns Al Mead and Raleigh Rhodes in their Wildcats performed the maneuver, but were outmatched and were eventually forced to ditch their ruined fighters. In another example, initially USN Lieutenant Commander Sam Silber and his wingman executed the maneuver with a relative success during the Raid on Kavieng in 1944. However, a few days later they used it again and the attackers shot down the wingman, while Silber's aircraft was severely damaged.

== See also ==
- Index of aviation articles
- Finger-four formation
- Hineri-komi
