= Eduard Vahorovskyi =

Ukrainian military personnel (1965–2022)

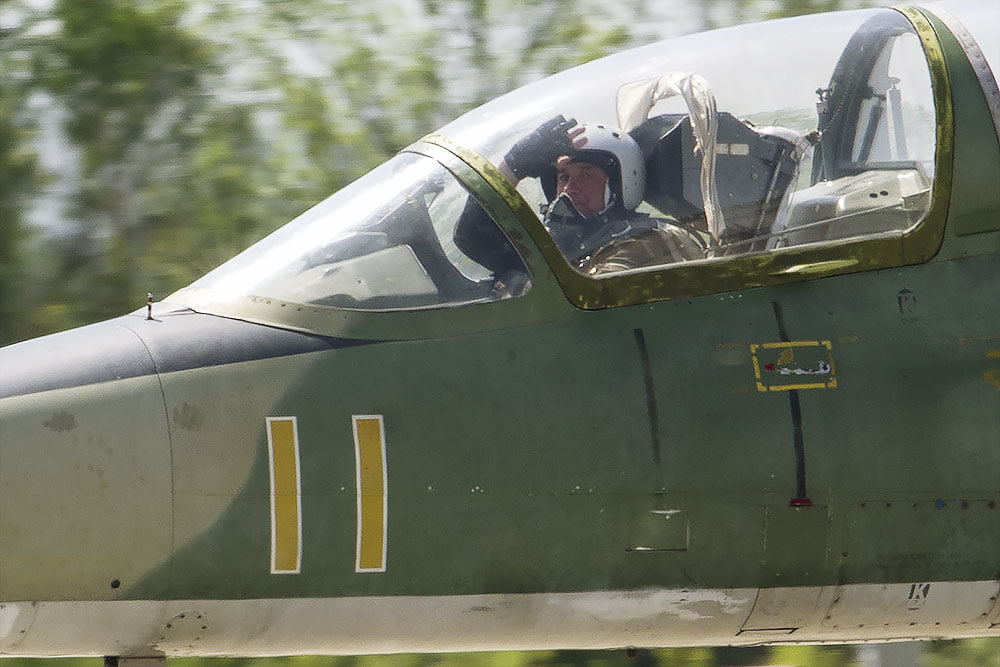
- Born: Eduard Mykolaiovych Vahorovskyi; 26 February 1965; Rubizhne, Luhansk Oblast, Ukrainian SSR, Soviet Union
- Died: 24 February 2022 (aged 56); Ozerne, Zhytomyr Oblast, Ukraine
- Education: Stavropol Higher Military Aviation School for Pilots and Navigators
- Military career
- Allegiance: Ukraine
- Branch: Soviet Air Forces; Ukrainian Air Force
- Service years: 1983—1991 (VVS); 1991–2003, 2014–2022 (PS ZSU)
- Rank: Lieutenant Colonel
- Conflicts: Russo-Ukrainian War; Annexation of Crimea; Russian invasion of Ukraine
- Awards: Order of the Gold Star (posthumously)

Eduard Mykolaiovych Vahorovskyi (Ukrainian: Едуард Миколайович Вагоровський; 26 February 1965 – 24 February 2022) was a Ukrainian military officer (Lieutenant Colonel). He was awarded the title of Hero of Ukraine (2022, posthumously).

== Biography ==
Eduard Vahorovskyi was born on 26 February 1965, in the city of Rubizhne, which was then part of the Ukrainian SSR in the Soviet Union.

From childhood, he dreamed of becoming a military serviceman. After finishing school, he enrolled in the Stavropol Higher Military Aviation School for Pilots and Navigators. After completing his studies, he spent a year in the Orenburg Oblast, where he served in a training regiment. Following that, he was stationed in the village of Ozerne in the Zhytomyr Oblast. At the age of 38, he retired from active duty with the rank of Lieutenant Colonel, and settled in Zhytomyr where he worked at the enterprise "EKTA-PROM". However, when the Russian armed aggression against Ukraine began in 2014, he returned to service. Upon returning to service, he was stationed with the 39th Tactical Aviation Brigade, which is based out of Ozerne Air Base, where he worked as an instructor pilot.

On 24 February 2022, he sacrificed his life while leading the Ukrainian military aviation away from a missile strike, allowing others to take to the skies.

He was laid to rest on 28 February 2022, in Ozerne, Zhytomyr Oblast.

== Awards ==
He was posthumously awarded the title of Hero of Ukraine with the Order of the Gold Star (28 February 2022) "for his personal courage and heroism demonstrated in the defense of Ukraine's state sovereignty and territorial integrity, and his loyalty to the military oath."
