= Barrel roll =

Aerial maneuver

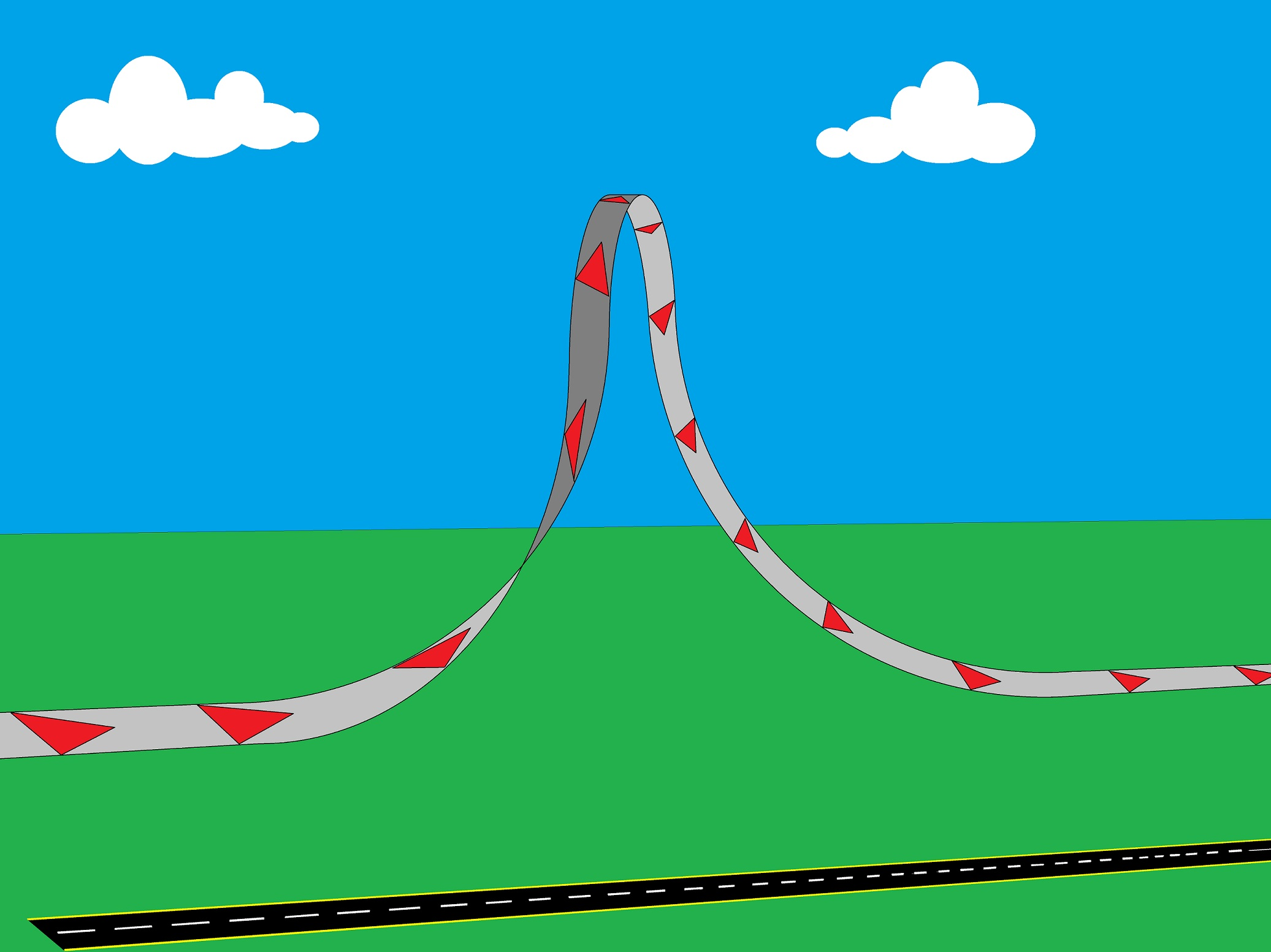
A diagram of a barrel roll

A barrel roll from the perspective of the wingtip

A barrel roll is an aerial maneuver in which an airplane makes a complete rotation on both its longitudinal and lateral axes, causing it to follow a helical path, approximately maintaining its original direction. It is sometimes described as a "combination of a loop and a roll". The g-force is kept positive (but not constant) on the object throughout the maneuver, commonly between 2 and 3g, and no less than 0.5g. The barrel roll is commonly confused with an aileron roll.

== Etymology ==
The barrel roll is so named because an aircraft executing this maneuver looks as though it were flying with its wheels running around the inside wall of a cylinder, or an imaginary barrel lying on its side. A more common modern visualization is to imagine an airplane trying to fly in a horizontal corkscrew around the line of the direction of travel. Although the maneuver predates the name, the term was first used in 1917, gaining popularity during the early 1930s.

== Aviation ==
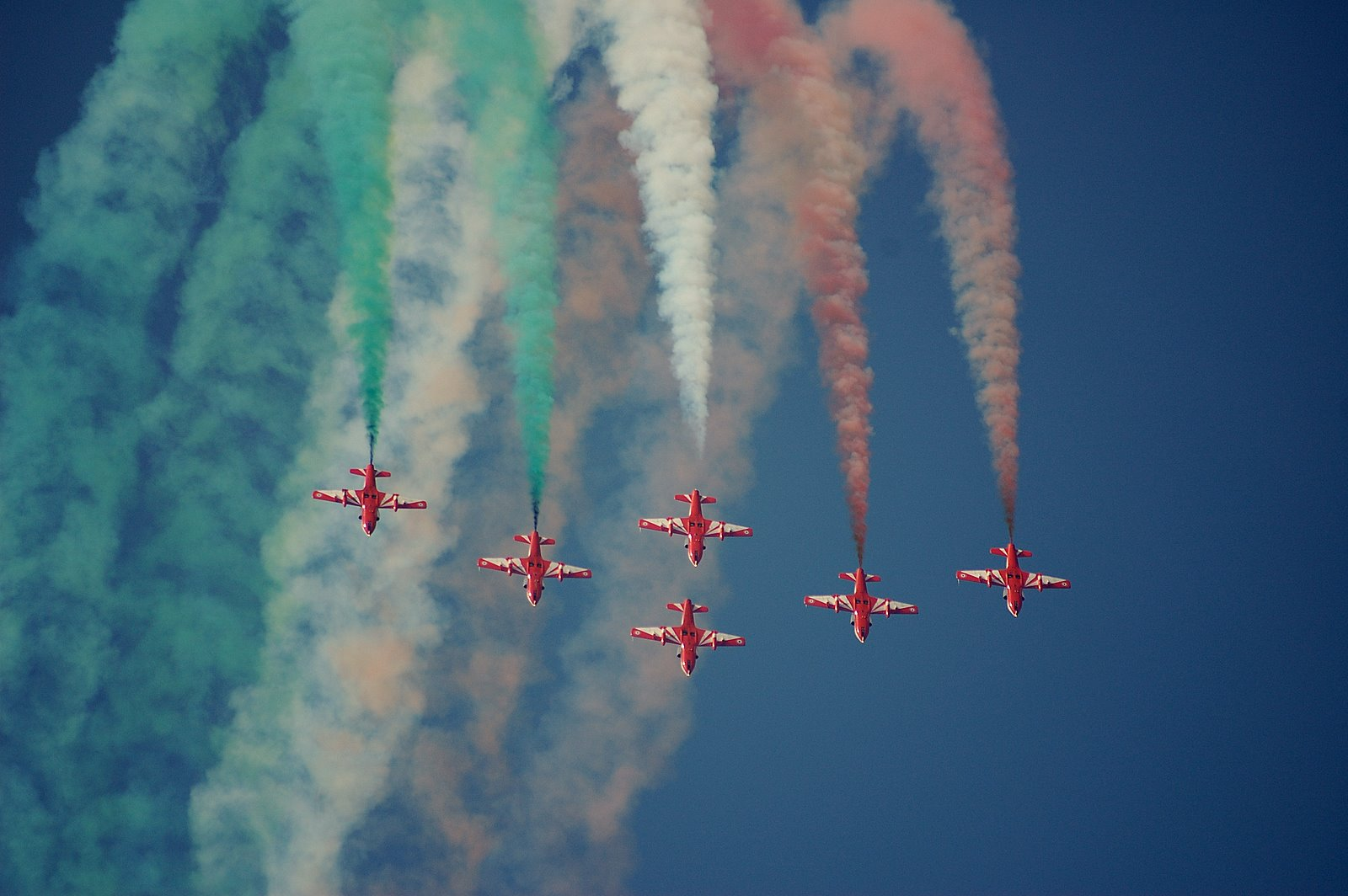
Barrel rolls being performed by the Indian Air Force Surya Kiran during an air show

In aviation, the barrel roll is an aerobatic maneuver in which an aircraft performs a helical roll around its relative forward motion, with the nose ending up pointed along the original flightpath. It is performed by doing a combination of a roll and a loop. The maneuver includes a constant variation of aircraft attitude (nose orientation) in two or perhaps all three axes. It consists of a rotation along the pitch axis (nose rotates upward, in a direction perpendicular to the wings) through the application of elevator input, followed by aileron input to rotate the aircraft along its roll axis. Sometimes rudder input is applied to help assist the roll through the yaw axis (nose rotates sideways), by swinging the tail over the top. At the midpoint (top) of the roll, the aircraft should be flying inverted, with the nose pointing at roughly a right angle to the general flightpath. The aircraft will have also gained altitude and travelled a short distance from the original flightpath. Flying inverted, the plane continues through the roll, descending in altitude and returning to the original flightpath. Upon completing the roll, the airplane should end up flying along the same flightpath, and at roughly the same altitude at which the maneuver began.

The term barrel roll is frequently used, incorrectly, to refer to any roll by an airplane (see Aileron roll, Slow roll or Snap roll).

=== History ===
The barrel roll was originally called a "side somersault". It was first performed in 1905 by Daniel Maloney. He was flying a glider owned by John Joseph Montgomery during an exhibition show, which was lifted by balloon and then released. During this particular show, Maloney did a very hard turn, causing the wings to warp, performing the maneuver quite by accident, but was quickly followed by his companion flyer, David Wilke, who did two barrel rolls in a row; one to the left and the other to the right.

Outside of aerobatic competition, the Boeing 367-80 and Concorde prototype were barrel-rolled during testing. The Boeing 367-80 was rolled twice by Tex Johnston in an unauthorized maneuver while demonstrating the aircraft to the International Air Transport Association over Lake Washington, Seattle. The Concorde was rolled multiple times by its test pilots, including Jean Franchi and Brian Walpole. Avro test pilot Roly Falk rolled the Avro Vulcan during a display at the 1955 Farnborough airshow, gaining height during the maneuver.

Richard Russell, a ground service agent with no piloting experience, performed a barrel roll in 2018 after stealing a Horizon Air De Havilland Canada Dash 8-400 from Seattle–Tacoma International Airport. After successfully completing the barrel roll, he intentionally crashed the aircraft on the sparsely populated Ketron Island in Puget Sound, killing only himself.

=== Execution ===
To do a barrel roll in its purest form, from the pilot's perspective, it may best be thought of as a roll around a point on the horizon that is 45 degrees off the flightpath. Starting from a level flight, the pilot will usually pick such a point on the horizon as a reference, which is typically between the nose and the wing-tip, out the side window (if the plane has side windows). This point can be anything in that area, like a distant lake, mountain peak, or cloud. The pilot will then pull back on the stick, bringing the plane up into a brief climb. As the nose passes through the horizon, the pilot begins to apply aileron input, which is accomplished by easing the stick to either the right or the left. As the airplane rolls it will continue to pitch in the direction of the lift vector. The pilot will need to carefully control the roll rate, keeping the nose 45 degrees off the reference point on the horizon as the nose traces a circle around this spot. Some planes may require rudder input, while most high powered planes will only need to be guided by aileron and elevator control.

When the aircraft has rolled 90 degrees, and the wings are vertical, the nose should be angled about 45 degrees directly above the reference point. As the plane continues to roll upside-down it will begin to level out, and the horizon will appear to rise to meet the nose. When in the completely inverted position, the aircraft should be level and the nose should still be 45 degrees to the side of the reference point, putting it 90 degrees off the original flightpath. As the nose drops through the horizon, the pilot may need to reduce the elevator pressure, to avoid altitude loss by counteracting the force of gravity and the loss of lift. Still keeping the nose 45 degrees off the reference point, the plane should roll into level flight along the same flightpath and at the same altitude at which the maneuver began. If properly performed, the reference point should appear to remain in a fairly stationary position, relative to the plane, while the horizon spins around it.

== Military attack ==
In air combat maneuvering, historically known as dogfighting, the term "barrel roll" may refer to one of many maneuvers. These maneuvers are often simply called barrel rolls, but many fall into the category of "displacement rolls".

=== Barrel roll ===
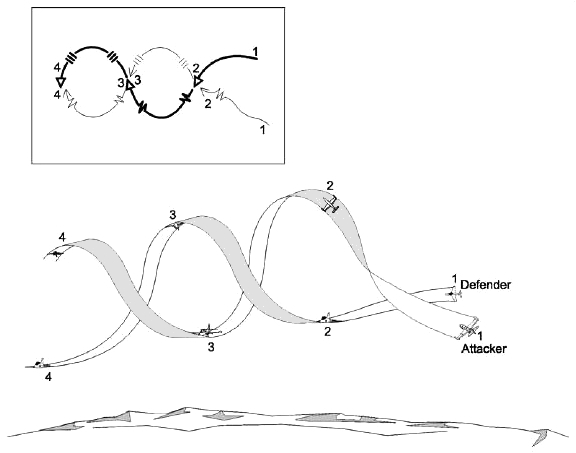
Rolling scissors

The term barrel roll, by itself, most often refers to a helical roll around a straight flightpath, the purpose of which is to slow the relative forward motion (downrange travel) of the aircraft. This can help a defender to force an attacker, who is usually behind the defender, to fly out in front, called overshooting. This can also help an attacker to prevent an overshoot. This often forces both planes to continue through a series of rolls known as a rolling scissors maneuver. A barrel roll is also often used to check blind spots while remaining on a steady flightpath.

==== Rolling scissors ====
Rolling scissors, also called vertical scissors or simply "rollers", is usually an undesirable maneuver to be caught in, both for the attacker and the defender. The advantage usually goes to the aircraft with the higher turn rate, especially when pulling the nose through the top and bottom of the turns. Correct placement of the lift vector during the maneuver is crucial to keep from moving ahead, relative to the opponent. There are many optical illusions that affect the pilot's ability to determine the relative position of the opponent, and mistakes can easily be made. It is extremely difficult to get a suitable firing solution during the rolling scissors. If the aircraft have a thrust-to-weight ratio of less than one, each consecutive roll will be lower than the previous, and the pilots can quickly find themselves at ground level. Any advantage is usually lost by the first pilot that attempts to disengage.

==== High-g barrel roll ====
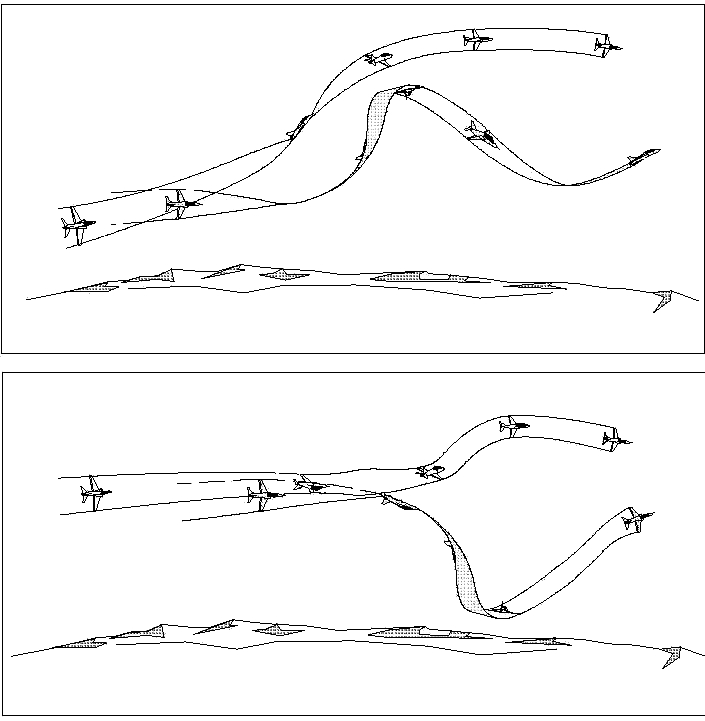
A high-g barrel roll, performed over the top and underneath

A high-g barrel roll is a last-ditch defensive maneuver, performed when the attacker has achieved a suitable firing solution. The maneuver is performed when the attacker is very close, and a barrel roll performed by the defender may cause an overshoot. The maneuver begins by cutting the throttle, extending the speed brakes, or turning very hard to encourage an overshoot. The maneuver is then executed by applying excessive elevator pressure and hard rudder input during the barrel roll to assist with the roll. The sudden change in the relative forward speed may cause a surprised attacker to fly out in front of the defender. Depending on the situation, a high-g barrel roll can be performed "over the top", by beginning the roll like a normal barrel roll. The roll can also be performed "underneath", by doing a half aileron roll into the inverted position and beginning the barrel roll while upside-down.

=== Displacement roll ===
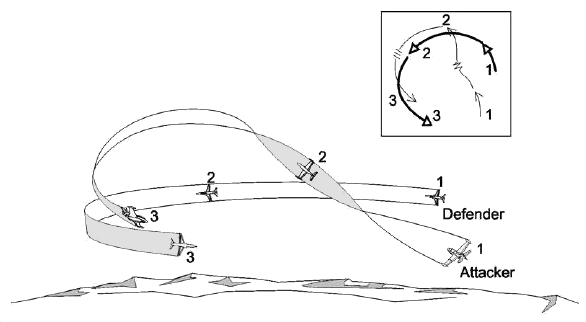
A displacement roll, providing a reduction in turn radius

There are a variety of maneuvers that can be described as displacement rolls. A displacement roll is a barrel roll that moves the aircraft laterally, displacing it from its projected flightpath and moving it onto a new flightpath. Depending on how a displacement roll is executed, it may provide a shift laterally onto a parallel flightpath, or more aggressive rolls can be used to provide a reduction in turn radius.

By moving the fighter more into the vertical plane, the pilot can use gravity to assist the aircraft in turn performance. In vertical or oblique geometric planes, the turn will be much slower over the top, and the turn radius will be much smaller. Conversely, the turn radius will be much larger through the bottom of the turn, but the turn rate will be faster. Displacement rolls make full use of this assistance provided by gravity. By moving the fighter into more of the vertical plane, the pilot can then control the roll rate and yaw to provide a sharp reduction in turn radius, helping the attacker to prevent an overshoot and remain inside of the defender's turn. Such a displacement roll, also called a "rollaway", uses the geometry of three dimensions by performing a half barrel-roll into the inverted position, then performing the second half of a loop with very little roll, keeping the lift vector aligned with the defender as the aircraft reverses direction.

==== Canopy roll ====
A canopy roll

A canopy roll is the simplest form of displacement roll. The roll is used to provide lateral displacement while maintaining the original heading. The maneuver begins like a normal barrel roll, but when the plane is nearly inverted, the pilot places the elevators and ailerons close to the neutral position. Called "unloading", this allows the inverted aircraft to fly momentarily in a fairly straight arc. When the pilot has achieved enough lateral displacement, the pilot continues through the second half of the barrel roll.

This type of roll is called a canopy roll because it is often used as a way for aircraft to quickly change positions, by rolling over the top of an airplane and coming down on the other side. Canopy rolls are often used in combat, to displace the attacker in relation to the defender's flightpath. An attacker following inside the defender's turn may need to displace the aircraft to the outside of the defender's turn in order to prevent an overshoot. Similarly, if following outside the turn of a defender that is much more maneuverable, the attacker may be unable to pull the nose up into a suitable firing position. By using a canopy roll, the attacker can shift the aircraft laterally away from the defender's flightpath. This will cause the flightpaths of both airplanes to cross, using geometry to change the attacker's aim. Canopy rolls are often used by the attacker when the defender reverses the turn, allowing the attacker to follow the reversal while keeping the correct relative position. The 1966 World War I-setting air combat film The Blue Max shows a canopy roll being performed by one of the pair of German Luftstreitkräfte pilots (the characters of Bruno Stachel and Willi von Klugermann), both flying Fokker Dr.I fighters, just before the tragic "daredevil" under-bridge flight sequence in the film.

==== Lag displacement roll ====
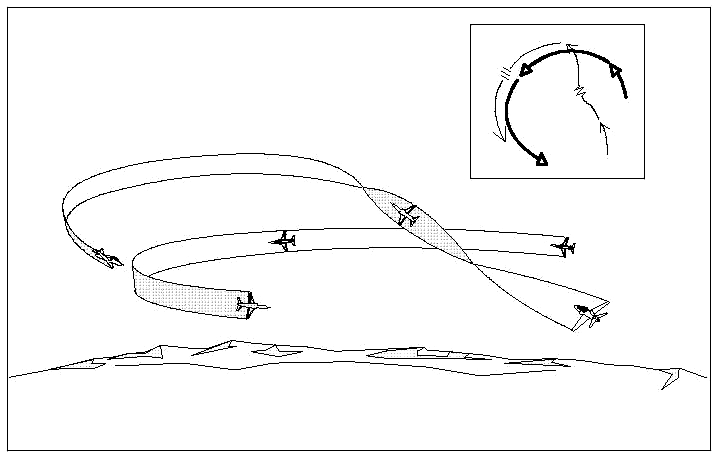
A lag roll

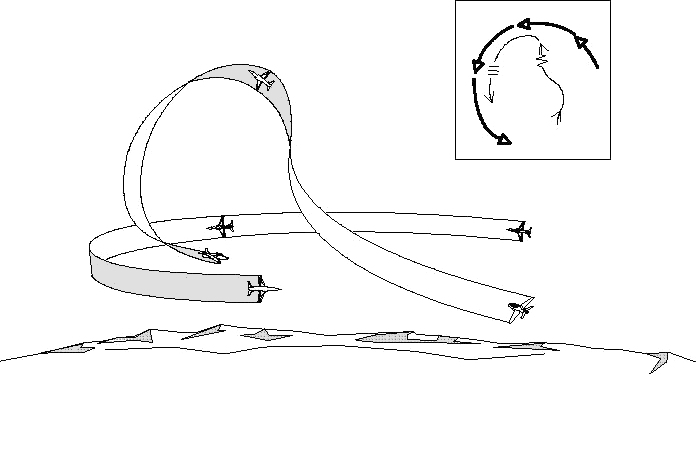
Barrel roll attack

A lag displacement roll, or "lag roll", helps improve the firing position of the attacking aircraft, and helps to increase range. The attacker performs the roll during a hard, turning chase, rolling both up and away from the turn. Typically performed a little slower than a normal displacement roll, the attacker achieves the proper reduction in turn radius on, or just outside the defender's turn. Upon completing the roll, when the aircraft's lift vector points directly at the enemy, the pilot pulls back on the stick, reentering the turn with the ability to achieve a better firing position.

==== Barrel roll attack ====
A barrel roll attack is a military maneuver that improves the attacker's offensive position and prevents the attacker from overshooting. In this maneuver the defender breaks one direction and so the attacker performs a barrel roll in the opposite direction. The attacker pulls back on the stick more than a normal barrel roll, performing a tighter loop than the roll. It is the three-dimensional equivalent of a 90-degree turn, and the attacker finishes the loop, having completed three quarters of a roll, with the nose pointed along the defender's flightpath.

The maneuver is performed when an overshoot is imminent and cannot be corrected with a normal displacement roll. Much more aggressive than a normal displacement roll, the maneuver begins by rolling slightly toward the direction of the defender's break, and then pulling up sharply. At roughly 30 degrees from the horizon, the pilot begins the barrel roll away from the defender's break, applying more elevator pressure than roll. When inverted, the pilot then uses the assistance provided by gravity combined with rudder control to bring the fuselages of both aircraft into alignment. As the nose passes through the horizon, the pilot will then align the lift vector ahead of the defender, to bring the fighter back into the correct geometric plane, inside of the defender's turn.

The success of a barrel roll attack depends greatly on the aircraft's ability to zoom climb. As the attacker is coming down, the defender may counter by pulling up into a barrel roll, resulting in a rolling scissors.

=== Rudder roll ===
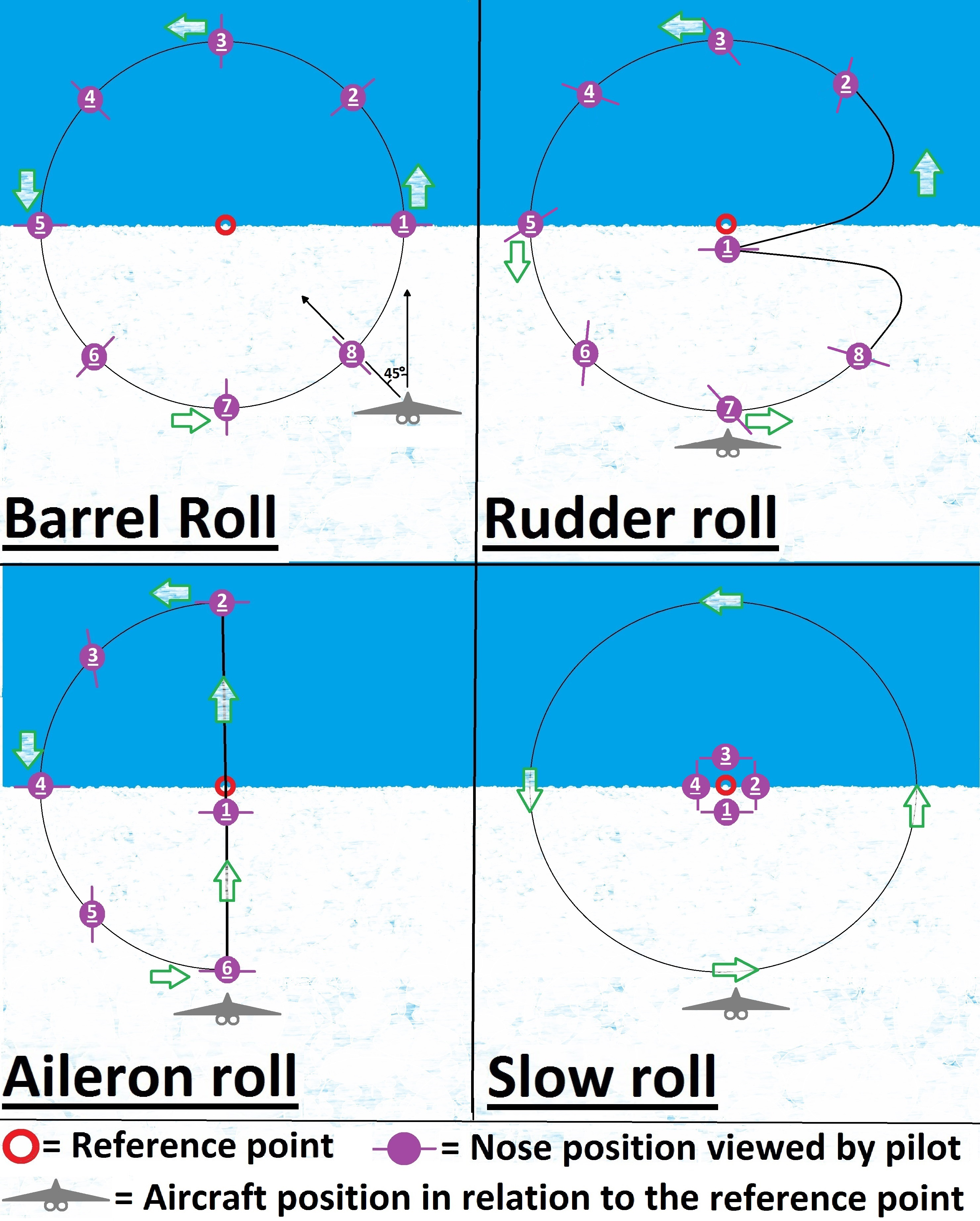
Four different rolls, as seen from the pilot's perspective. In both the barrel roll and the rudder roll, the aircraft is at its lowest altitude when the nose is in position one, and at the highest part of the maneuver when the nose is in position five.

A maneuver that greatly resembles a tight barrel-roll is the rudder roll. The rudder roll differs from the barrel roll both in that the application of back-stick pressure (elevator) is usually very high and that aileron input is held neutral throughout the maneuver. Instead, roll is produced by creating a sideslip through application of rudder combined with elevator. The aircraft will roll in the direction of the rudder. This will cause the aircraft to sideslip through the roll, keeping the nose pointed at only a shallow angle from the flightpath. The aircraft will appear to slide almost sideways at a slight angle around a very narrow, helical path, more like an imaginary pipe than a barrel.

The roll rate of a rudder roll is directly related to the angle of attack and mach number. The higher the speed and the greater the angle of attack; the faster the roll will occur. The roll will tend to be more effective if the stick is pulled back until the point of buffet (the turbulence that precedes a stall), and often to the maximum that the elevators will allow.

The rudder roll is typically more controllable than a barrel roll and can be performed at much higher roll-rates, but usually must be performed at very high speeds to produce the amount of energy needed to carry the slip all the way through the roll. It is generally more effective at combat speeds than a barrel roll due to the lowered effectiveness of aileron authority at higher speeds. The rudder roll is a basic maneuver used by air-to-air and surface-to-air missiles for providing in-flight course corrections, often giving them an erratic-looking flight path that oscillates around its target's track.

== See also ==
- List of roller coaster elements § In-line twist
