= Feilding Aerodrome =

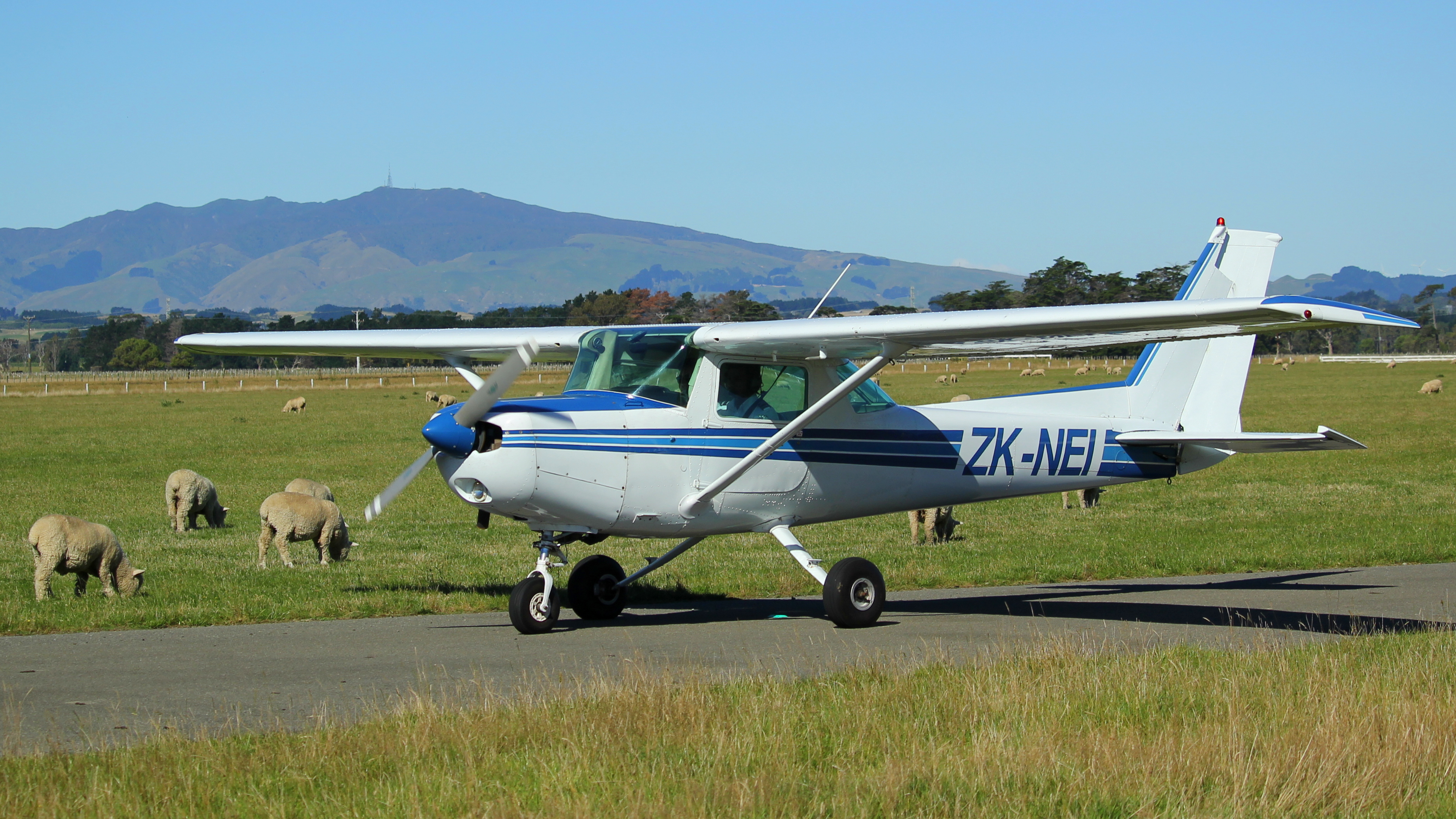
- A Cessna 152 taxis whilst sheep graze at Feilding Airport (2017)
- IATA: none; ICAO: NZFI

Summary
- Airport type: Public
- Operator: Feilding Aerodrome (Inc)
- Location: Feilding
- Elevation AMSL: 214 ft (65 m)
- Coordinates: 40°15′21″S 175°36′19″E
- Interactive map of Feilding Aerodrome

Runways
Direction	Length		Surface
Direction	ft	m	Surface
10/28	3,379	1,030	Bitumen

Feilding Aerodrome (ICAO: NZFI) is a small airport located three nautical miles (5.6 km) southeast of Feilding, a town in the Manawatu District in the North Island of New Zealand.

== Operational Information ==
- Runway Strength – ESWL 1020
- Pilot Activated Lighting available
- Circuit:
  - Runway 10 – Left Hand
  - Runways 28 – Right Hand
  - Circuit Altitude 1100 ft AMSL
  - Standard Overhead Rejoin Altitude 1500 ft AMSL

Gliders from the Wanganui Manawatu Gliding Club operate at the field.

== Accidents and incidents ==
On 23 January 2012, a Yak-52 plane crashed at Timona Park, shortly after taking off from the airport after a screwdriver became lodged into the elevator of the aircraft during an acrobatic slow roll at about 10:45 NZDT.

== Sources ==
- NZAIP Volume 4 AD
- New Zealand AIP (PDF)
