= 39th Tactical Aviation Brigade =

- 39-та бригада тактичної авіації
- Active: 1992 – present
- Country: Ukraine
- Allegiance: Armed Forces of Ukraine
- Branch: Ukrainian Air Force
- Type: Air Force Aviation
- Role: Fighter
- Size: Brigade
- Part of: Air Command Center
- Garrison/HQ: Ozerne Air Base, Ukraine
- Anniversaries: 3 July
- Engagements: Russo-Ukrainian War: War in Donbas; Russian invasion of Ukraine
- Decorations: For Courage and Bravery

Commanders
- Current commander: Lieutenant Colonel Oleksiy Zakharchuk

Insignia
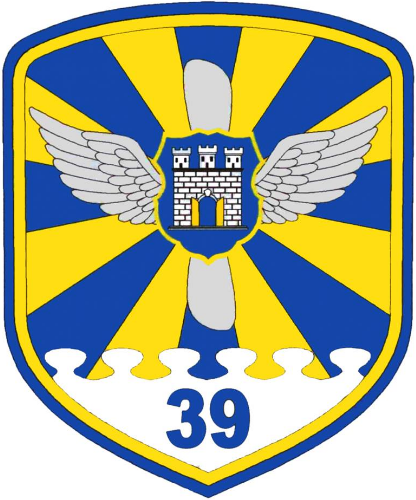
- Former Insignia

- Roundel

- Fin flash

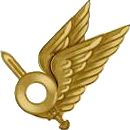
- Aviation branch insignia collar

Aircraft flown
- Fighter: Su-27, Mirage 2000
- Multirole helicopter: Mi-8
- Trainer: L-39

The 39th Tactical Aviation Brigade (MUN A1435) is brigade of the Ukrainian Air Force, tasked with operating Su-27, Aero L-39 Albatros, and French-donated Mirage 2000 aircraft. The brigade traces its origin to the 894th Fighter Aviation Regiment of the Soviet Air Force but its direct lineage is from the 9th Fighter Aviation Regiment of the Ukrainian Air Force. It is based at Ozerne Air Base.

== History ==
The brigade traces its origin to the 894th Fighter Aviation Regiment of the Soviet Air Force, a part of the 28th Air Defense Corps which in February 1992, after the Dissolution of Soviet Union, became a part of the Ukrainian Air Force, although the regiment was officially active on the MiG-29 aircraft, but the unit did not receive new aircraft, so in August 2001, the regiment's personnel were retrained on the Su-27 fighters, transferred from the 204th Tactical Aviation Brigade. The regiment now became the 9th Fighter Aviation Regiment.

On 27 June 2002, a MiG-29UB from the 114th Tactical Aviation Brigade was prepared for demonstration piloting during the airshow but due to weather conditions, it couldn't arrive in Lviv so in its place, a Su-27UB from the 9th Fighter Aviation Regiment was sent in its place. More than 10,000 spectators attended the air show, staged to commemorate the 60th anniversary of the Ukrainian Air Force's 14th Air Corps. The Su-27 aircraft was flown by two experienced pilots; it entered a rolling maneuver at 12:52 p.m. with a downward trajectory at low altitude. It rolled upright once more and was still descending rapidly when the left wing dropped shortly before it hit the ground, at which point the crew initiated ejection. The aircraft flattened out initially, skidding over the ground towards stationary aircraft and striking a glancing blow against the nose of an Ilyushin Il-76 transport aircraft, before beginning to explode and cartwheel into the crowd of spectators. Both pilots survived with minor injuries, while 77 spectators were killed, including 28 children in what became known as Sknyliv air show disaster. Another 100 were hospitalized for head injuries, burns, and bone fractures. Other injuries were less severe and did not require hospitalization. A total of 543 people were injured in the accident. Some bystanders suffered serious mental disorders from what they saw. Following the disaster, the pilots stated that the flight map which they had received differed from the actual layout. On the cockpit voice recorder, one pilot asks, "And where are our spectators?". Others have suggested that the pilots were slow to react to automated warnings issued by the flight computer. A criminal case was initiated against the commander of the 9th Aviation Regiment, Oleg Dzyubetskyi, but he was declared not guilty.

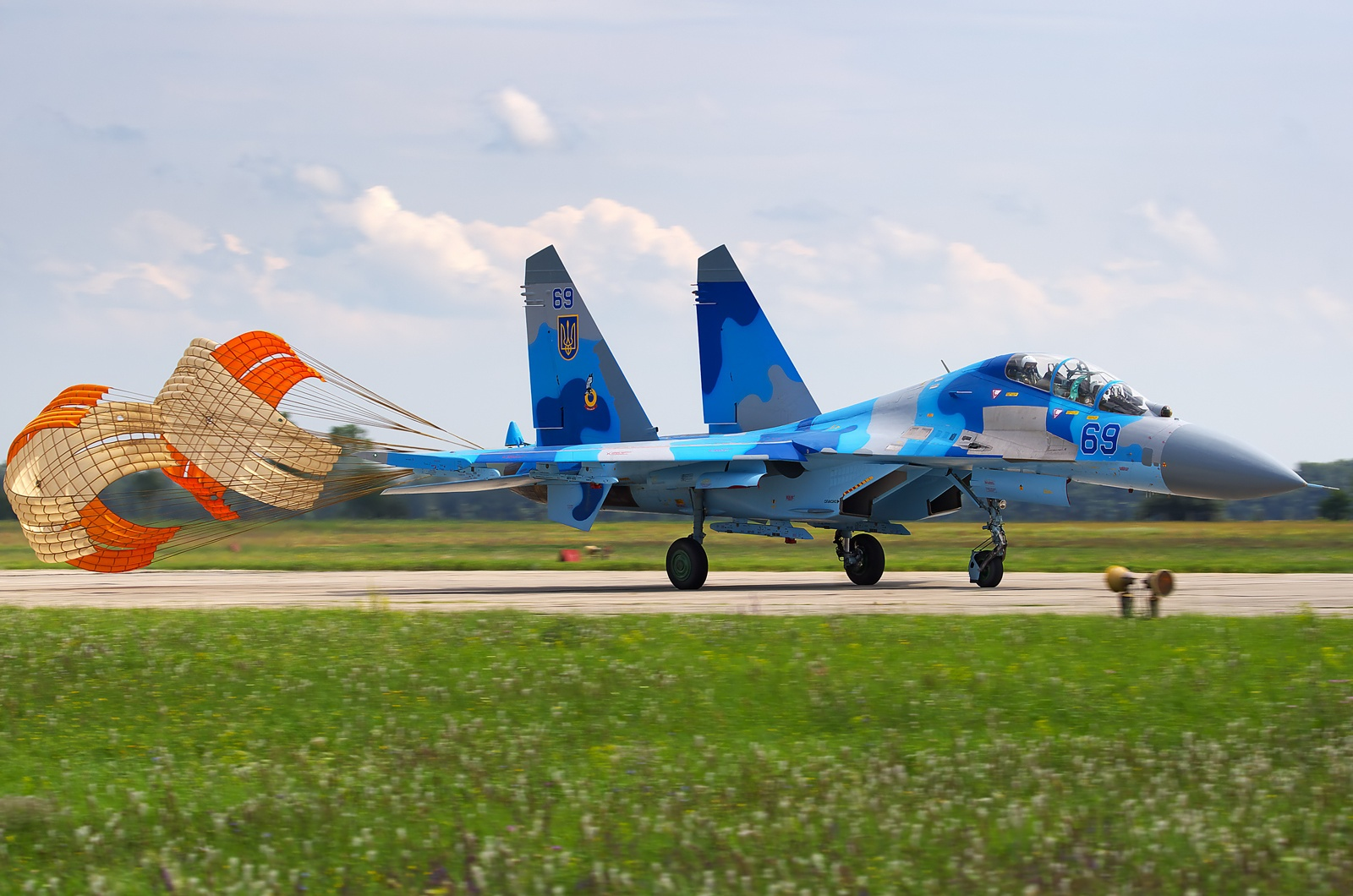
Su-27UB of the Brigade

In December 2004, the regiment was retrained on the MiG-29 and then in December 2008 on the Su-27, becoming the 9th Fighter Aviation Brigade, during this period Yuliy Mamchur was the brigade's commander.

During January 22–23, 2010, Su-27 and Su-27UB crews of the 9th Tactical Aviation Brigade performed day and night flights in difficult meteorological conditions. The main task of the flights was further training.

In 2011, the brigade was reorganized into the 37th Separate Fighter Squadron, a part of the 40th Tactical Aviation Brigade. In February 2013, the squadron took part in air exercises in Crimea, using Su-27s which repelled an air attack by two MiG-29 aircraft of the Sevastopol Tactical Aviation Brigade. In April 2013, the Su-27 and L-39 aircraft, the pilots made 45 sorties, spending about 40 hours in the sky. The purpose of the event was to prepare the flight crew to perform air defense and combat duty tasks, perform regular inspections, flight training and maintenance of training in difficult weather conditions, during day and at night. In August, the squadron took part in the international air show "International air show-2013" in the city of Radom, Poland.

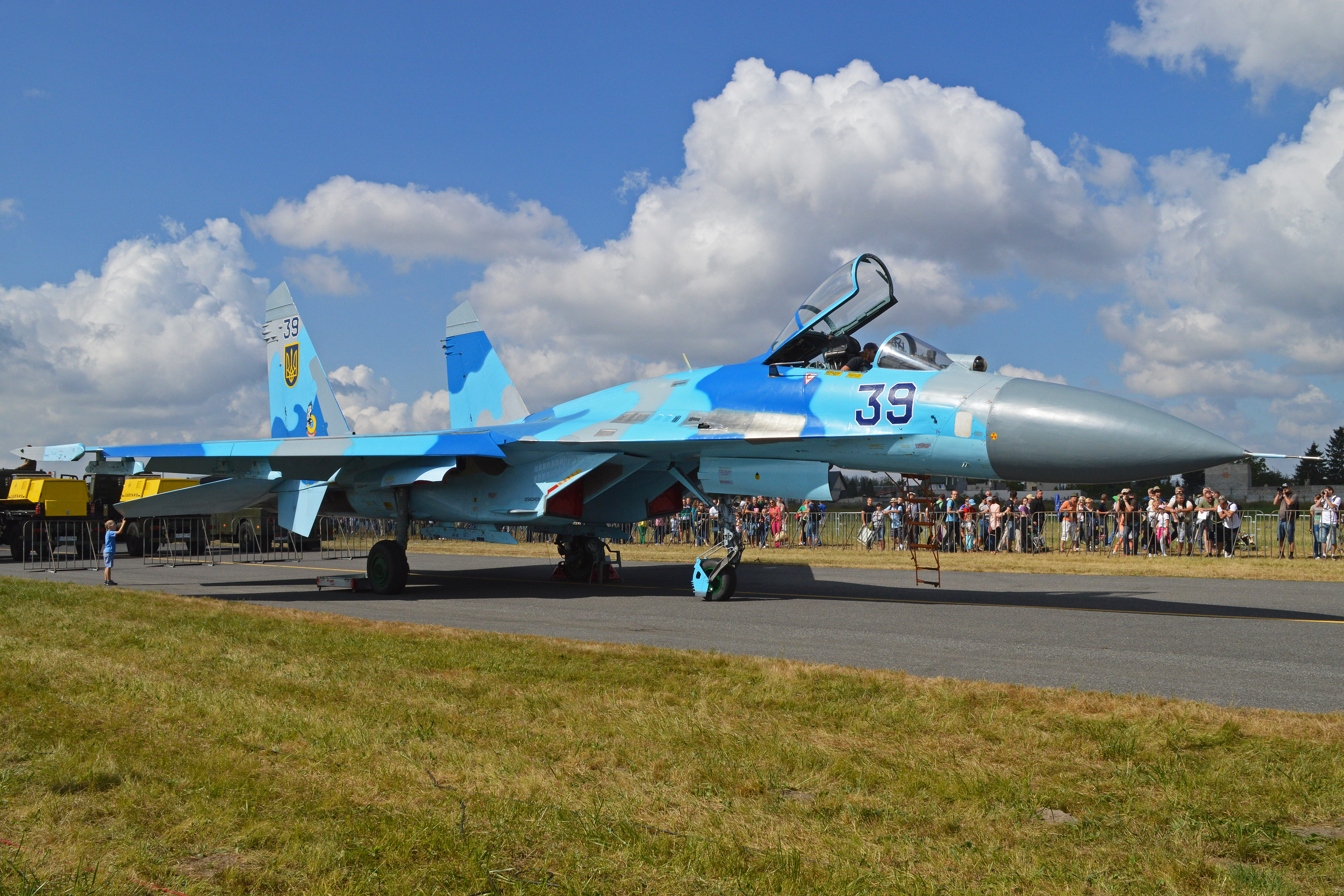
Su-27 of the brigade at Radom Airshow

Before the start of the Russo-Ukrainian war, there was a possibility of disbanding the squadron as it was planned to relocate its personnel to Vasylkiv Air Base.

In February 2014, the pilots of the squadron made 19 flights with a flying time of about 14 hours.

On 5 January 2015, a MiG-29 and a MiG-29UB of the squadron were transferred to the Air Force for the 114th Tactical Aviation Brigade and two Su-27s repaired at the Zaporizhzhia were handed over to the squadron.

In 2016, a Su-27UB was transferred to the squadron after undergoing repairs at Zaporizhzhia in addition to two repaired and modernized Su-27s.

In 2017, a Su-27P1M fighter-interceptor of the squadron was transferred to the 831st Tactical Aviation Brigade.

On 15 December 2018, at around 3:00 p.m, a Su-27 of the brigade crashed near Ozerne while landing, its pilot Major Oleksandr Vasyliovych Fomenko was killed during the crash.

On 1 January 2018, the squadron was reformed into the 39th tactical aviation brigade. The organizational staffing structure of the brigade, guards and security units, logistics, barracks and all other premises, were reestablished, a modernized SU-27, an AN-26, L-39, and Mi-8MT helicopter were also transferred to the 39th Brigade.

On 24 February 2022, at the start of the Russian invasion of Ukraine, faced with a Russian missile attack, brigade's aircraft took to skies. During the attack Lt. Col Eduard Mykolayovych Vahorovsky was killed in action when his Su-27 was hit destroying it whilst enabling others to take to skies saving the other aircraft, he was posthumously awarded the "Hero of Ukraine", the highest military award for Ukrainian personnel. Another pilot Dmytro Valeriyovych Kolomiiets heroically deflected the attack of enemy aircraft by distracting the Russian aircraft towards his L-39 but in this action, his aircraft was ultimately shot down by a Russian plane, he was also awarded the "Hero of Ukraine". Andrii Yuriyovych Tsyganov was also killed on 24 February, a Su-27 and a refueling vehicle of the brigade were destroyed at apron of the Ozerne Air Base as a result of Russian missile strike. On 21 August 2022, a pilot of the brigade, Lt. Col Babych Pavlo Petrovych was killed while performing an unspecified combat operation. On 24 August 2022, the brigade was awarded the honorary award "For Courage and Bravery". On 12 October 2022, Colonel Oleg Shupik was killed when his aircraft crashed in Poltava Oblast when missile hit his aircraft while returning after bombarding Russian positions in unspecified areas of Eastern Ukraine.

On 22 December 2023, a Su-27 of the brigade was shot down killing its pilot, Stanislav Romanenko.

The brigade received an unknown number of Dassault Mirage 2000s donated by France in February 2025. One Mirage was lost in an accident on July 22, 2025. The pilot ejected from the aircraft and survived.

== Commanders ==
- Colonel Mykola Ivanovich Tkachenko (1992–1994)
- Colonel Deikun Oleksandr Mykolayovych (1994–1998)
- Colonel Serhii Volodymyrovych Kushnir (1998–2002)
- Colonel Valery Borisovych Lozytskyi (2000–2001)
- Colonel Oleg Feofanovych Dzyubetsky (2002)
- Colonel Valery Borisovych Lozytskyi (Note: Second Term) (2003–2006)
- Colonel Bilko Pavlo Anatoliyovych (2006–2010)
- Lieutenant Colonel Oleksiy Mykolayovych Zakharchuk (2010-)
- Colonel Oleksandr Dovhach (Later than 2010 - 2026)

.

== Sources ==
- Trigub, Oleksiy (2018-01-25). "У повітряних силах сформовано нову бригаду" (PDF). People's Army. p. 9. Archived from the original (PDF) on 27 January 2018.
- Denis Tomenchuk (2018-01-27). "39 окрема авіаційна ескадрилья стала бригадою". militaryaviation.in.ua/. Military Aviation. Archived from the original on 27 January 2018.
- Vladimir Anokhin, Mikhail Bykov (2014). Все истребительные авиаполки Сталина. Первая полная энциклопедия. Yauza-press. p. 944. ISBN 978-5-699-67104-5.
- Боевой путь 894 истребительного авиционного полка (в\ч 23257,пгт Озерное)
- На аеродромі Озерне відбулась льотна зміна
- Су-27 у Воздушных Силах Украины
- Структура Повітряних Сил ЗС України
- "В Україні з'явилась нова бригада тактичної авіації". mil.in.ua/. Ukrainian military portal. 2018-01-27. Archived from the original on 27 January 2018.
- 79 років 39-й бригаді тактичної авіації
