= 894th Fighter Aviation Regiment =

The 894th Fighter Aviation Regiment (Russian: 894-й истребительный авиационный полк), Military Unit Number 23257, was a fighter aviation regiment of the Soviet Air Forces in World War II, which then served with the Soviet Air Defence Forces for forty years after the war. From 1945 to 1992, it was based at Ozerne, in Zhitomir Oblast, in the Ukrainian SSR. Taken over by Ukraine in 1992, it was formally disbanded later that decade.

== History ==
The regiment was established in April 1942 under the auspices of the 8th Reserve Fighter Aviation Regiment at Bagay-Baranovka in Saratov Oblast, from two separate fighter squadrons. It was later assigned to the 215th Mixed Aviation Division, 1st Air Army, briefly in July 1942, and then to the 9th Fighter Aviation Corps PVO under the Western Air Defense Front (June 1943-May 1945). A single serviceman, Nikolai Abramchuk (ru:Абрамчук, Николай Иванович), serving with the regiment, was awarded the Hero of the Soviet Union.

During the war, it flew the Hawker Hurricane; the Yakovlev Yak-1; the Yakovlev Yak-7, and then the Yakovlev Yak-9 from 1945-1950. The unit operated the Sukhoi Su-9 (ASCC "Fishpot") in the 1960s, replacing it in 1979 with the MiG-23 (Flogger-G). The airfield hosted up to 38 MiG-23MLD, ML, and UB models from 1979 to 1992 and onwards.

In 1986, the regiment was reassigned from the 138th Fighter Aviation Division of the 24th Air Army to the 28th Air Defence Corps of the 2nd Air Defence Army, Soviet Air Defence Forces. In its last years it flew the MiG-23ML/MLD.

In 2000, under Ukrainian control, the regiment was redesignated the 9th Fighter Aviation Regiment. Later it was redesignated as a brigade and became the 39th Tactical Aviation Brigade.
