= Timona Park plane crash =

2012 plane crash in Feilding, New Zealand

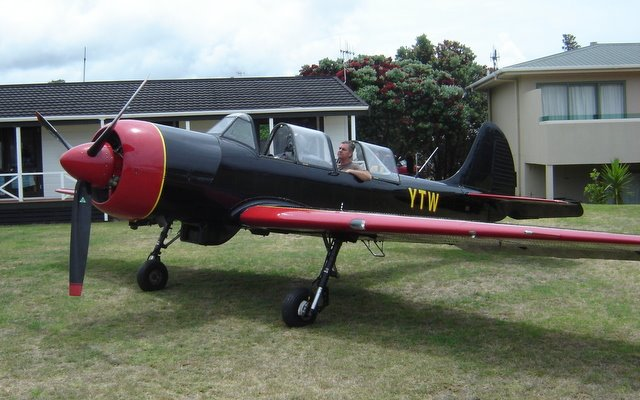
- Aircraft involved in the crash in 2008

Accident
- Date: 23 January 2012
- Summary: FOD restricting elevator control following a slow roll.
- Site: Timona Park, Feilding, New Zealand; 40.2245°S 175.5826°E

Aircraft
- Aircraft type: Yak-52TW
- Registration: ZK-YTW
- Flight origin: Feilding Aerodrome
- Occupants: 2
- Passengers: 1
- Crew: 1
- Fatalities: 2
- Survivors: 0

On 23 January 2012, a Yak-52 plane crashed at Timona Park, Feilding, New Zealand, after a screwdriver became lodged into the elevator of the aircraft during an acrobatic slow roll at about 10:45 NZDT.

== Occupants ==
The pilot, Dr Ralph Saxe who was 51, held a private pilot licence with an instrument and aerobatic rating. His total flying time amounted to approximately 2,900 hours with 52 of those hours flown in the incident aircraft. He was a doctor with expertise in facial sculpting. Dr Brett Ireland, the only passenger, was 50 and was friends with Saxe. He was a chiropractor in Australia.

== Aircraft ==
The Aerostar Yak-52TW was a tail-wheel version of the Yak 52 that was the aircraft involved in the crash. It was a fully aerobatic aircraft of all metal construction. It was manufactured in 2003 in Romania, and exported to the US. In 2008, the aircraft was imported into New Zealand where it was registered as ZK-YTW. In 2010, ownership of ZK-YTW was transferred to a trust in which Saxe was a member. The airframe and engine had, at the time of the crash, accumulated 266.5 hours of total flight time. There were no deferred maintenance inspections or defects recorded. A weight and balance calculation placed the centre of gravity for the aircraft within the limits specified for aerobatic flight.

== Accident ==
At 10:35 a.m., the aircraft departed Feilding Aerodrome on runway 28. Two minutes later the aircraft contacted Ohakea ATC requesting permission to conduct aerobatic manoeuvres at 3,000 feet. The aircraft received a squawk code and got clearance to conduct aerobatics. The aircraft then did a clockwise orbit above Feilding Aerodrome to climb to 3,000 feet. Upon reaching 3,000 feet, the aircraft conducted a loop. After finishing the loop, the aircraft requested a further climb to 3,500 feet, which was approved. At this altitude, the aircraft made a stall turn. At the end of the stall turn, the aircraft flew north-west towards Feilding Township. During this part of the flight, the aircraft started a slow roll at 2,700 feet.

A RNZAF pilot who witnessed the slow roll maneuver described "to what looked like the last half of a slow roll". He stated it as "standard" until suddenly the aircraft went into a steep 45 to 50 degree nosedive, in which the engine power remained on.

In the vicinity of Timona Park, several witnesses observed the aircraft in a high-speed dive, which appeared to be banking to the right at the time. At 10:45 a.m., the aircraft crashed into the ground at Timona Park, Feilding, killing both Saxe and Ireland. Three witnesses were flying model aircraft at the park when the aircraft passed within approximately 50 metres of them.

== Crash investigation ==
The Civil Aviation Authority of New Zealand (CAA) was notified of the crash the same day as the accident. The Transport Accident Investigation Commission was also notified but declined to investigate. A CAA investigation started on 24 January 2012, a day after the accident.

A screwdriver was located approximately 15 metres from the crash site and its position aligned with the tail wheel 100 metres away and the tail section in the wreckage. Several fresh-looking abrasions were apparent on several areas of the screwdriver's handle. The investigation determined that the screwdriver had ejected from the aircraft's tail section during the accident. Inspection of the left elevator attachment fitting revealed gouges not consistent with damage caused during the impact. It was deemed that the screwdriver handle was the most likely source of the fragment taken from the elevator quadrant cable end fitting. It was determined that the screwdriver had entered the tail section via the top of the rear fuselage. For that to have occurred, the aircraft needed to have been subjected to inverted flight, coupled with an elevator-down input by the pilot.

== Airworthiness Directive ==
Following the crash, the CAA issued Airworthiness Directive DCA/YAK/8 in March 2012, mandating the fitment of a barrier into the rear fuselage of all Yak 52 models. The Airworthiness Directive also included the requirement to thoroughly inspect all of the fuselage for the presence of foreign object debris prior to the fitment of the barrier.
