= Aileron roll =

Aerial maneuver

Aileron roll

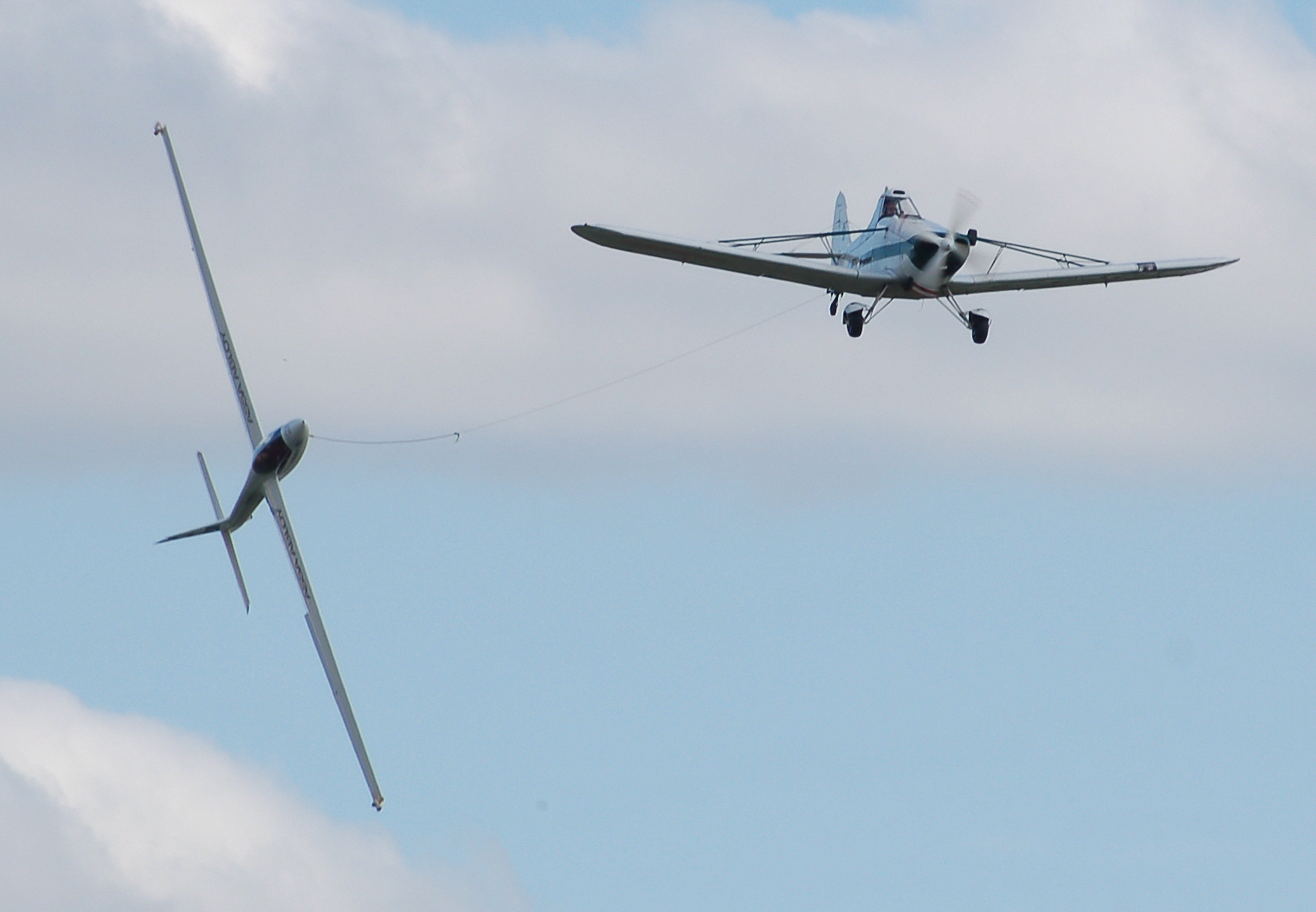
Swift aerobatic glider performing an aileron roll while being towed. The "nose up attitude" necessary to maintain approximately level flight at the shown phase of the maneuver is clearly visible. Note the aileron deflection on the right wing.

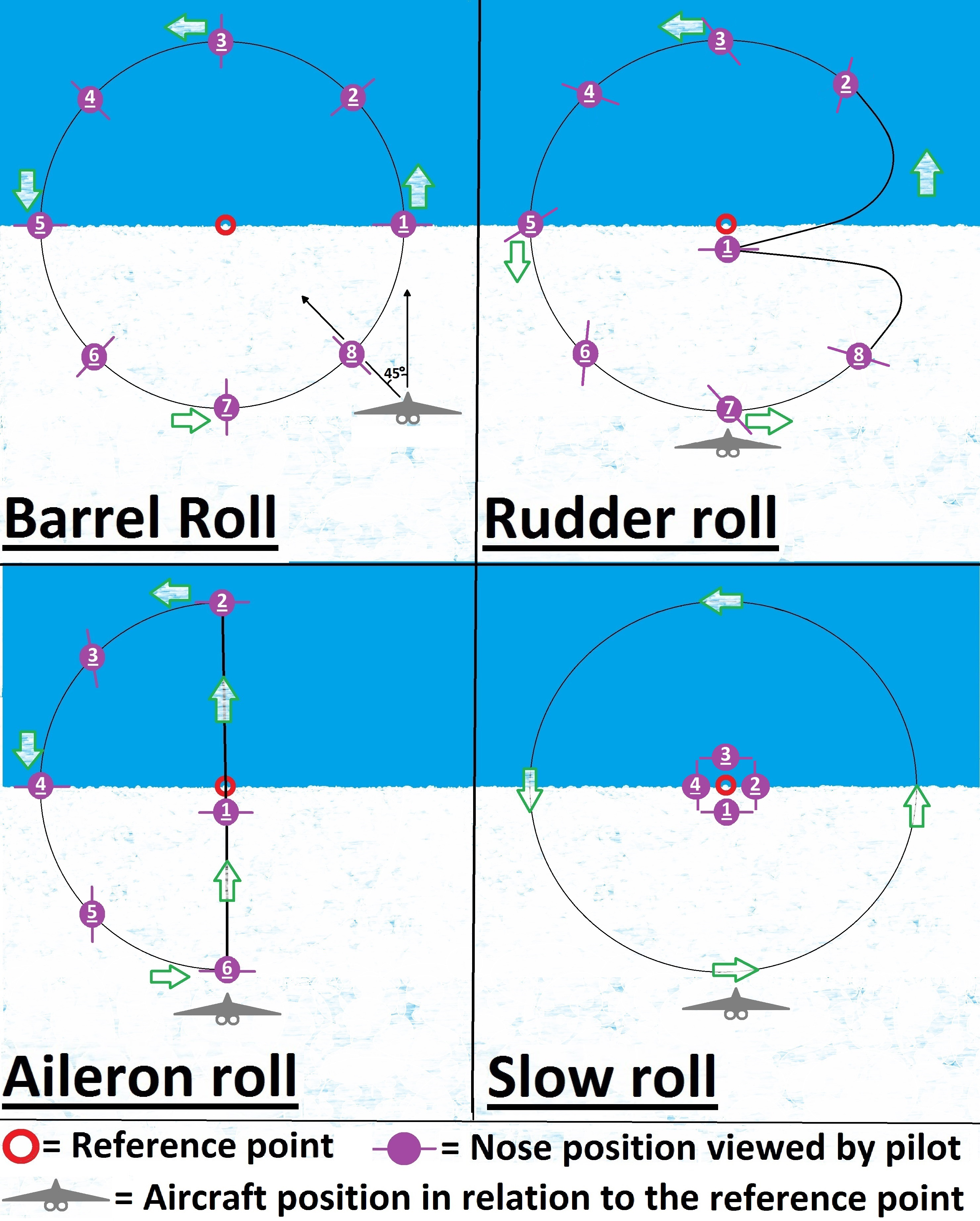
Diagram of how an aileron roll is performed in relation to other common rolls

The aileron roll is an aerobatic maneuver in which an aircraft does a full 360° revolution about its longitudinal axis. When executed properly, there is no appreciable change in altitude and the aircraft exits the maneuver on the same heading as it entered. This is commonly one of the first maneuvers taught in basic aerobatics courses. The aileron roll is commonly confused with a barrel roll.

== Execution ==
The aileron roll is commonly executed through the application of full aileron in one direction. In some lower powered general aviation and aerobatic training aircraft, prior to applying aileron input, the pilot must begin the maneuver by trading altitude for airspeed (i.e. diving). This helps achieve enough airspeed to complete the roll without losing rudder and aileron control. The minimum airspeed needed depends on the aircraft's design, but is generally about 120 to 200 knots. Because full aileron is applied, structural limitations prevent many aircraft from performing the maneuver at very high speeds.

Starting from level flight, the pilot pitches the aircraft up about 10 to 30 degrees above the horizon, into a brief climb. The purpose of pitch-up is twofold. This causes an increase in altitude which minimizes altitude loss and airspeed gain. As the aircraft begins to roll, it starts to lose lift. When the wings are vertical, the only lift generated is a small amount from the fuselage, and the aircraft will begin to lose altitude. The brief climb compensates for the loss, allowing the aircraft to complete the roll at the same altitude the maneuver began. When the aircraft is completely inverted, the increased pitch results in greater angle of attack, enabling the inverted wing to generate lift.

After the initial pitch-up, the pilot places the elevators in the neutral position. Failure to do this will cause the aircraft to continue pitching up during the upright part of the maneuver, and downward in the inverted part, resulting in something resembling a barrel roll. The pilot then applies full aileron, accomplished by moving the stick to either the right or left. As the aircraft rolls about its longitudinal axis, the nose will begin to drop. Upon completing the roll, the nose will usually be 10 to 30 degrees below the horizon, so the pilot will need to pitch-up to return to level flight.

An aileron roll is an unbalanced maneuver. As the roll begins, the aircraft will have a tendency to yaw away from the angle of bank, referred to as "adverse yaw." The pilot will usually need to apply the rudder in the direction of the bank to keep the aircraft balanced. An aircraft performing an aileron roll will actually fly along a slightly helical path, and a very light, positive g force will be maintained.

An aileron roll is similar to the slow roll, and the two maneuvers are often confused with each other. However, unlike a slow roll, an aileron roll is performed at the maximum roll rate, and is uncontrolled in the pitch axis. It consists of a constant attitude change during the maneuver; from the initial pitch-up to the plane following a slight corkscrew path as the nose drops, followed by the final pitch-up. If the pilot picks a reference point on the horizon, directly ahead of the plane, the nose will actually appear to trace a shape similar to the letter "D" above this reference point.

== Uses ==
The aileron roll is commonly used in air shows and aerial combat training. The use of the pure aileron roll in air combat is contentious, but many common maneuvers bear heavy dependence on the aileron roll. Examples of this are the Immelmann turn, barrel roll, and split S.

An aileron roll carried out by a pilot as a sign of victory or celebration is known as a victory roll.

Test pilots commonly employ the aileron roll to evaluate an aircraft's turning characteristics (e.g. time to turn).
