= Rubizhne =

City in Luhansk Oblast, Ukraine

Rubizhne Рубіжне (Ukrainian) Рубежное (Russian)
- City
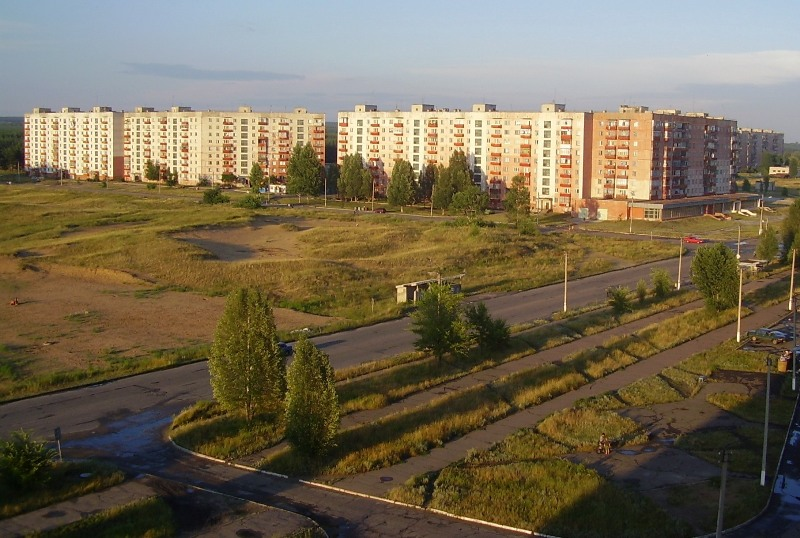
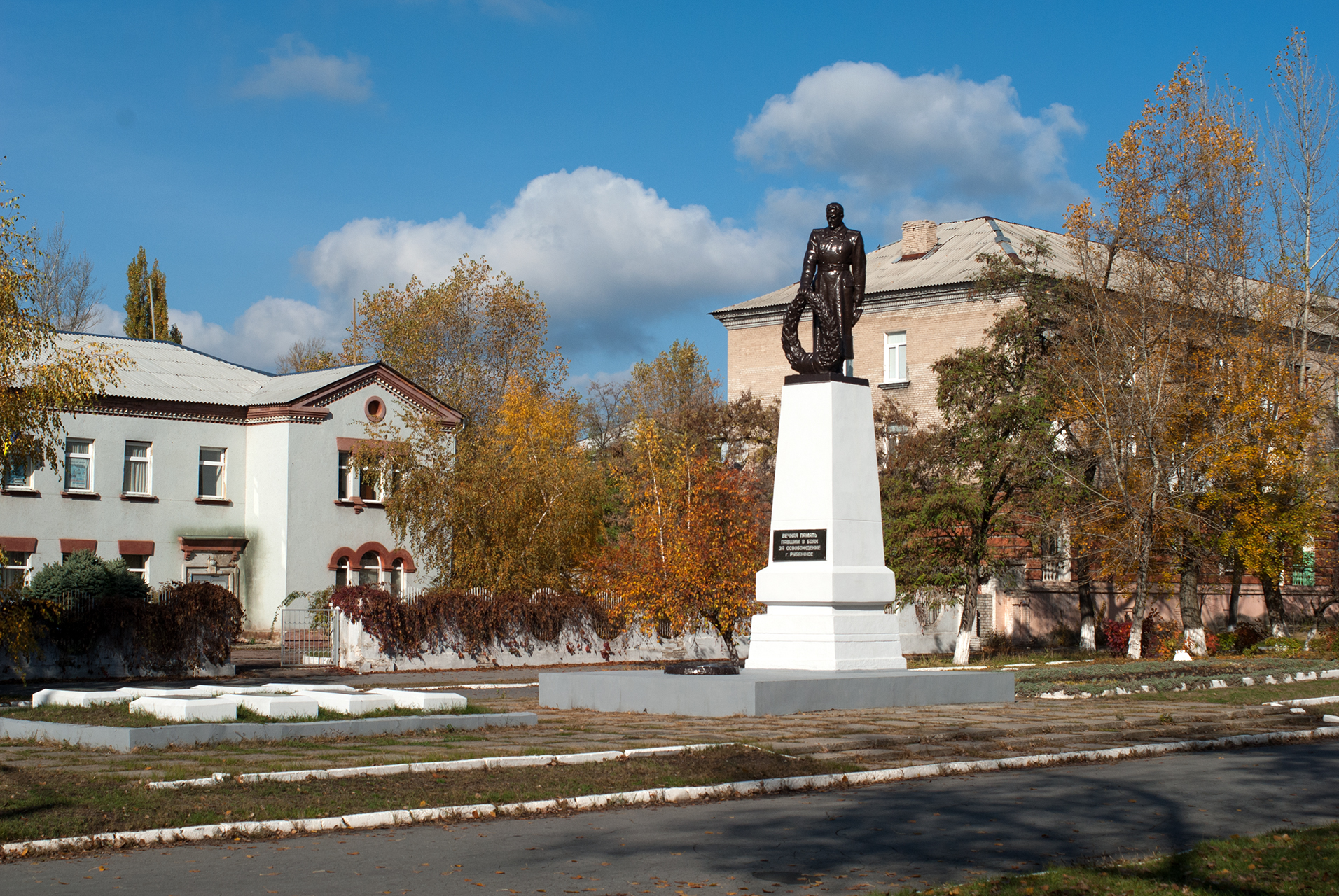
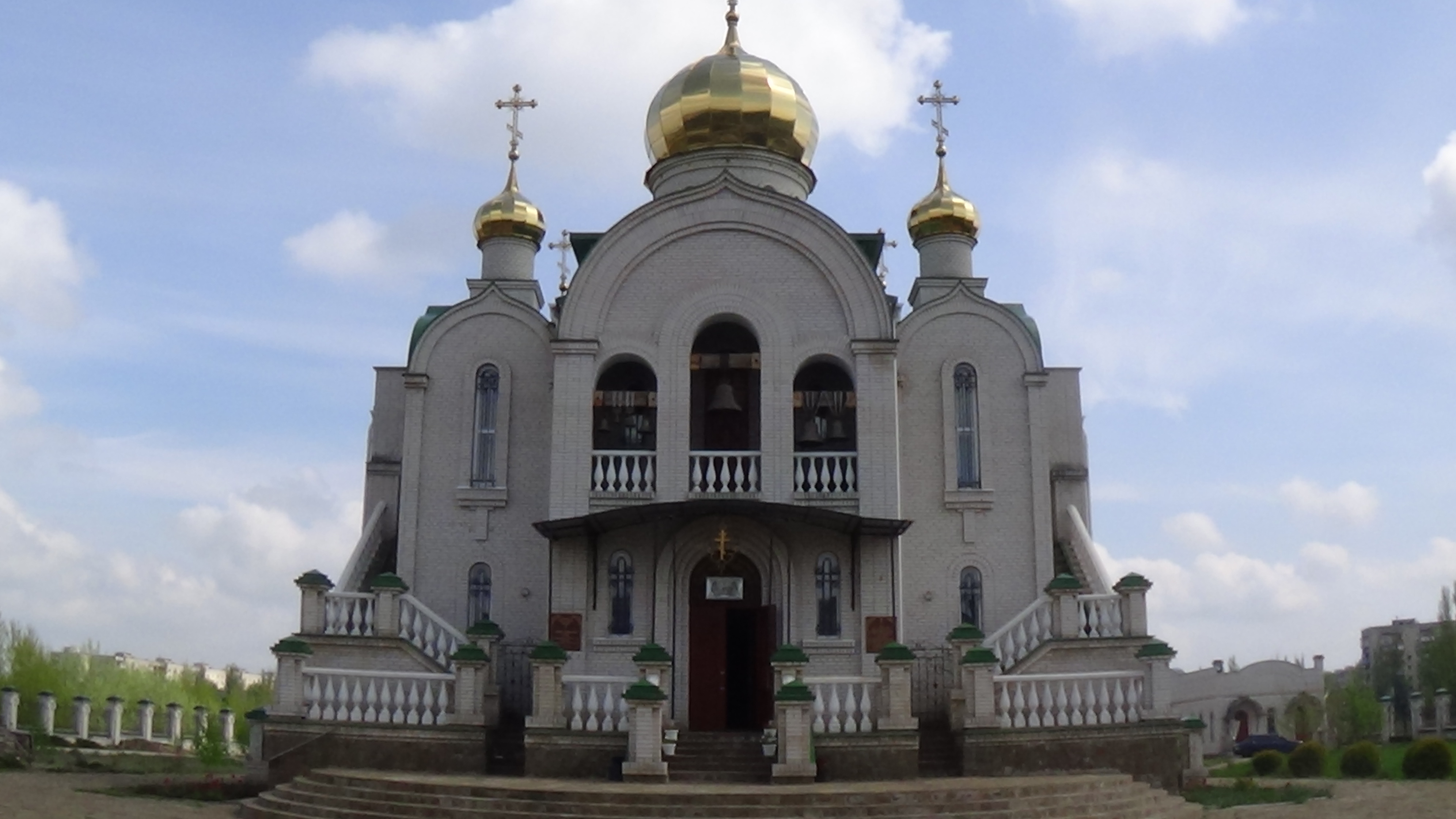
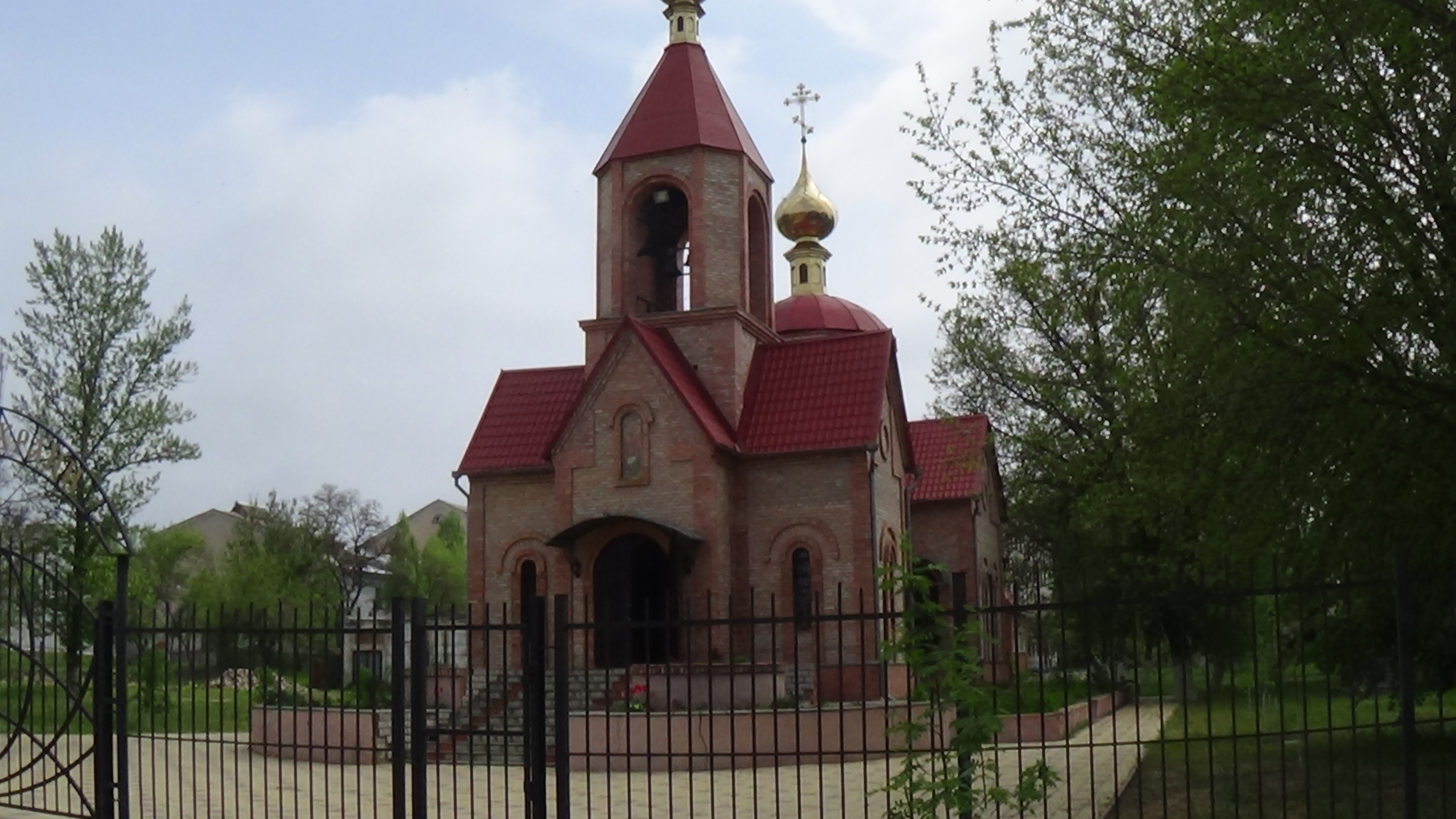
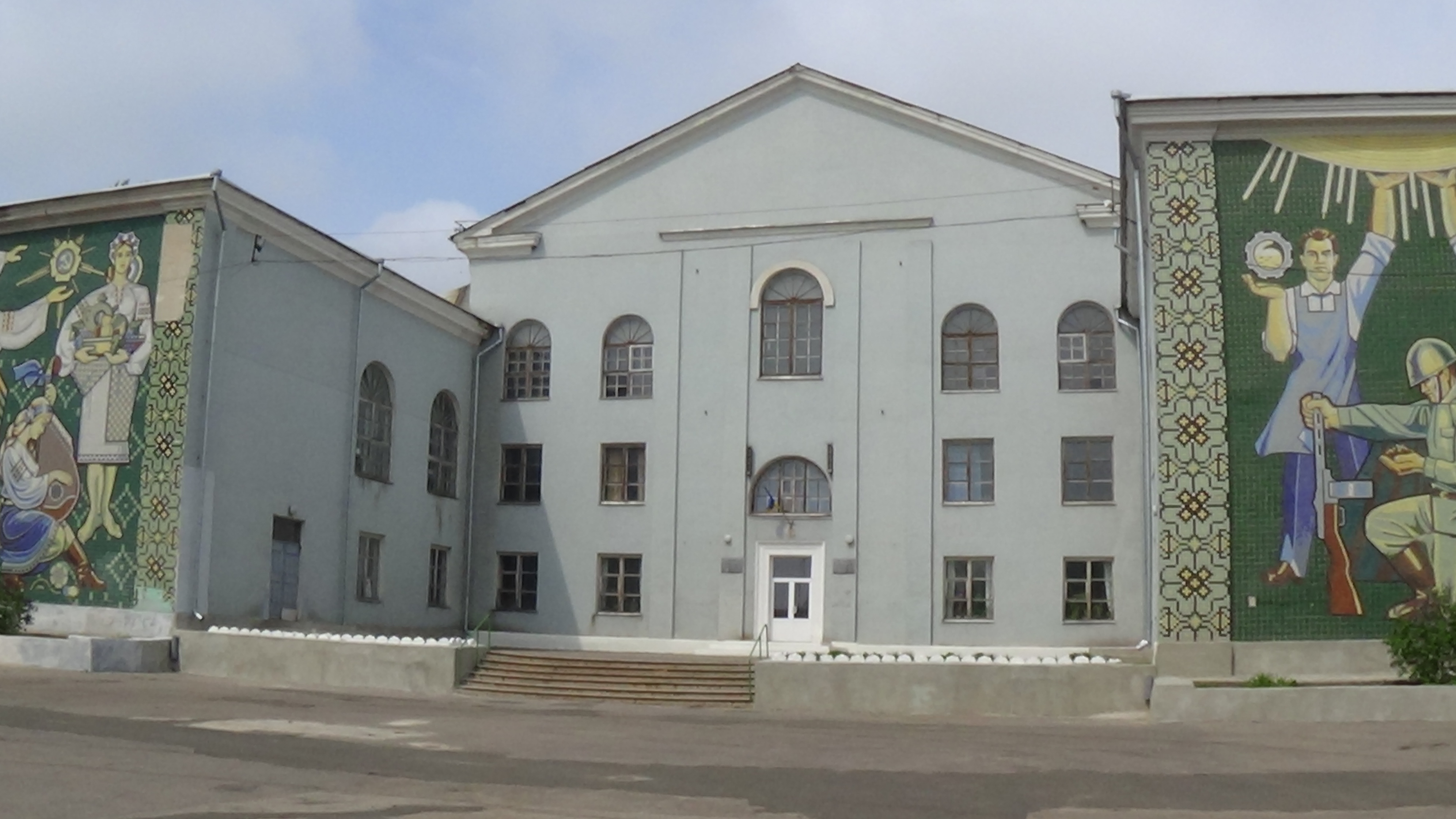

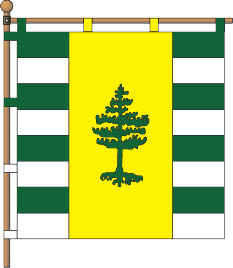
- Flag Coat of arms
- Interactive map of Rubizhne
- Location of Rubizhne in the Luhansk Oblast Location of Rubizhne in Ukraine
- Coordinates: 49°00′36″N 38°22′17″E
- Country: Ukraine
- Oblast: Luhansk Oblast
- Raion: Sievierodonetsk Raion
- Hromada: Rubizhne urban hromada
- Founded: 1896
- City status: 1934
- Elevation: 74 m (243 ft)

Population (2022)
  - Total: 55,247
- Climate: Dfb
- Website: https://agr-lnr.ru/

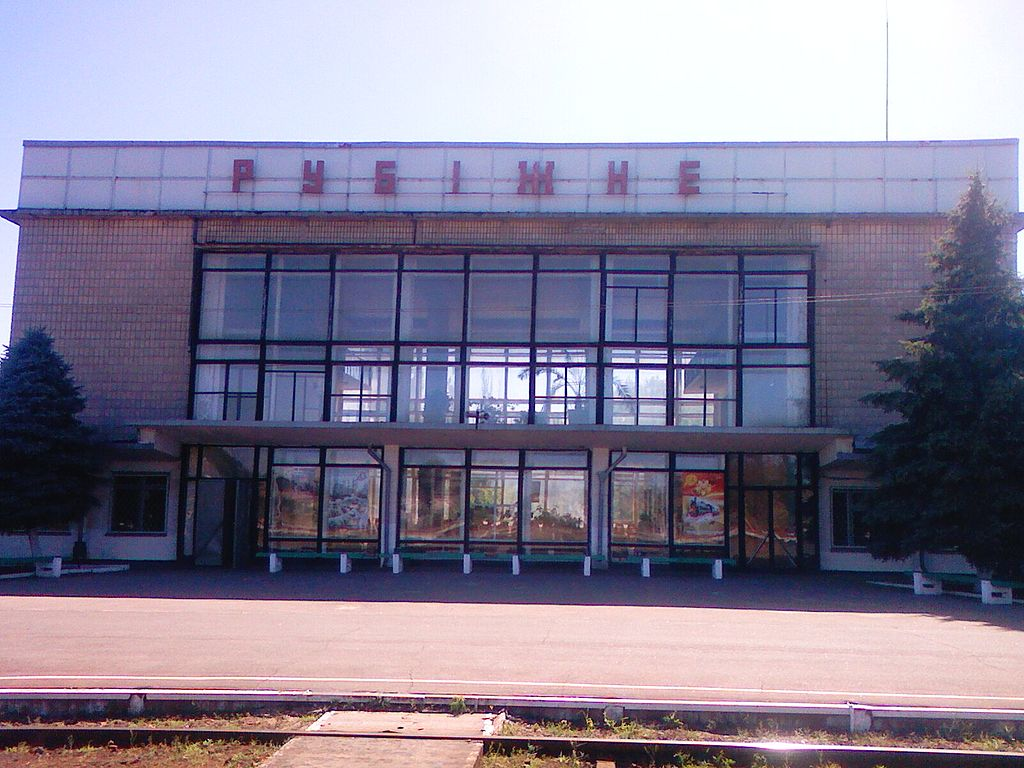
Railway station

Rubizhne (Ukrainian: Рубіжне, IPA: [rʊˈbiʒne]) or Rubezhnoye (Russian: Рубежное, IPA: [rʊˈbʲeʐnəjə]) is a city in Luhansk Oblast, in the Donbas region of eastern Ukraine. Situated on the left bank of the Donets River near the cities of Sievierodonetsk and Lysychansk. Prior to 2020, it was a city of oblast significance, before the designation was abolished.

In 2014, at the start of the war in Donbas, Rubizhne was contested between Ukrainian and pro-Russian separatist forces. From mid-2014 until early 2022, the city was under control of Ukrainian forces. From early 2022 it has been under Russian control following their victory in the Battle of Rubizhne. Russia claimed Rubizhne as part of their Luhansk People's Republic since its annexation of the region in September 2022.

The city had an estimated population of 56,247, as of January 2022, its current population is unknown.

== History ==
Rubizhne was founded in 1895 and incorporated as a city in 1934. The city started growing from a railway station built in 1904. A local newspaper is published in the city since March 1931.

During World War II, in 1942–1943, the German occupiers operated a Nazi prison in the town.

At the outbreak of the war in Donbas in mid-April 2014, pro-Russian forces captured several towns in Luhansk Oblast, including Rubizhne. On 21 July 2014, Ukrainian forces secured the city from the militants.

=== 2022 Russian invasion ===
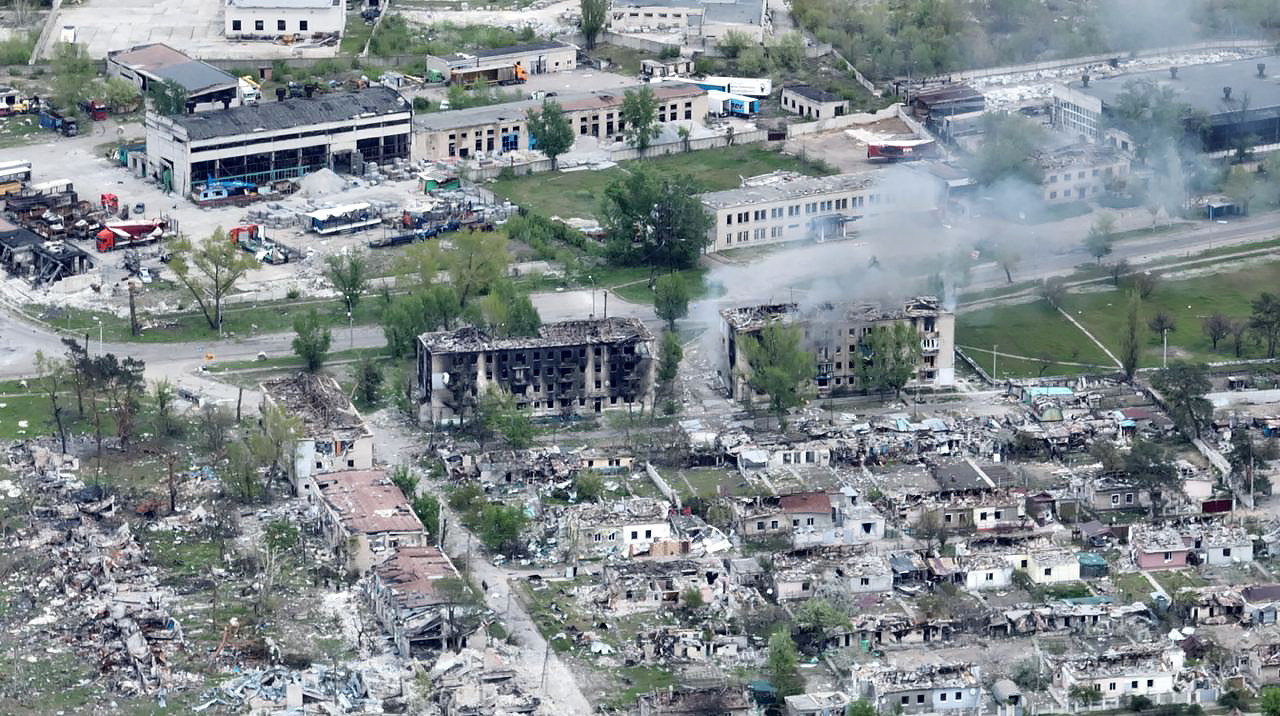
Destroyed Rubizhne after the battle in 2022.

During the 2022 Russian invasion of Ukraine, within the Eastern Ukraine offensive, Rubizhne came under heavy shelling from the Russian military. Some of the most intense strikes occurred late in March 2022, which destroyed dozens of buildings and caused civilian casualties. An attack on a nitric acid facility in Rubizhne was reported on 9 April 2022.

During the battle of Donbas, on 21 April, Russia reportedly captured the city, although Ukraine denied that. Ramzan Kadyrov, the president of Chechnya, then stated that Russia had "liberated" the city on 25 April.

On 12 May, it was reported that Ukrainian forces had fully retreated from the settlement to take up new defensive positions near Sievierodonetsk and had destroyed a bridge in order to slow the Russian advance.

Ukrainian forces were then forced from Sieverodonetsk in July 2022. Rubizhne remains under Russian control, as of December 2023.

== Demographics ==
Rubizhne had 65,322 inhabitants in the Ukrainian Census of 2001. The city's population declined to 59,951 by 1 January 2014.

The ethnic composition according to the Ukrainian Census of 2001:

Ethnic groups in Rubizhne
	percent
Ukrainians	66.34%
Russians	31.34%
Belarusians	0.74%
Armenians	0.38%
Tatars	0.11%
Moldovans	0.09%
Azerbaijanis	0.09%
Ashkenazi Jews	0.07%
Poles	0.06%
Georgians	0.05%

== Economy ==
Prior to the 2022 war, Rubizhne was known for its chemical and pharmaceutical plants and factories. The headquarters of "Microkhim", the largest Ukrainian producer of substances and medicines for cardiology, was situated in Rubizhne. One of Ukraine's biggest plastic pipe plants, Rubezhnoye Pipe Plant, is also located in the town.

== Notable people ==
- Vladimir Smirnov (1954-1982), Soviet fencer
- Eduard Vahorovskyi (1965-2022), Ukrainian fighter pilot
- Fedor Emelianenko (born 1976), Russian boxer of Ukrainian ethnicity
- Maksym Zhorin (born 1989), Ukrainian military officer and commander of the Azov Brigade
- Olha Lyakhova (born 1992), Ukrainian runner
- Vitaliy Yermakov (born 1992), Ukrainian football player
