= Roland Falk =

British test pilot (1915–1985)

"Roly" Falk OBE AFC*
- Born: 1915; London, England
- Died: 23 February 1985, aged 69; Jersey
- Other names: Roland John Falk
- Occupation: Test pilot
- Known for: Avro Vulcan testing

Wing Commander Roland "Roly" John Falk OBE AFC* (1915 - 1985) was a British test pilot noted for being at the controls on the maiden flight of the British V bomber, the Avro Vulcan. Falk typically flew dressed in pin stripe suit and tie.

== Early life ==
Falk was born in London in 1915, the second son of Diana Gwendoline Edith Cecil (née Stracey) and Oswald Toynbee Falk, and he was educated at Stowe School and the de Havilland Technical School. After gaining his pilot's licence he flew in both the Abyssinian War and the Spanish Civil War for the press. In 1937 he flew a newspaper service from London to Paris and then joined the Air Registration Board as a test pilot.

== Wartime service ==
Falk had been a member of the Reserve of Air Force Officers since 1935 and at the start of the Second World War in 1939 he joined the Royal Air Force. By 1943 he was chief test pilot at the Royal Aircraft Establishment Farnborough. At Farnborough he flew and tested captured German aircraft as well as carrying out operational flights with night fighter squadrons. For his service he was awarded the Air Force Cross twice, described as the Air Force Cross and bar.

== Delta-wing testing ==
At the end of the war in 1946 he joined Vickers-Armstrongs as Chief Experimental Test Pilot but was seriously injured in an accident at Wisley airfield while testing new reverse pitch propellers on Vickers Wellington X LN817. Falk recovered and became Chief Test Pilot with A V Roe in 1950. He soon embarked on one of the most important jobs of his career, test flying the Avro 707. The Avro 707 was an experimental delta-winged aircraft to gain experience for the design of the Avro Vulcan bomber, Falk's experience flying the German Messerschmitt Me 163 came in handy in what was seen as advanced and dangerous test flying. After testing the Avro 707, Falk made the first flight of the prototype Vulcan from Woodford Aerodrome on 30 August 1952.

Falk demonstrated the Vulcan on several occasions and designed much of the cockpit layout. During the 1955 Farnborough Airshow he barrel-rolled a Vulcan at the top of the post-take-off climb; although safe, he was rebuked for this manoeuvre by the organisers, but only because performing aerobatics in an aircraft weighing 69 tons and with a 99-foot wingspan was "not the done thing"!

He was appointed an Officer of the Order of the British Empire in 1952.

== Later life ==
Falk retired from Avro in 1958 and became a sales representative for Hawker Siddeley. until he set up his own aircraft business in Jersey.

He had married the daughter of former Avro test pilot Sydney "Bill" Thorn. The couple had two children.

Falk died in Jersey on 23 February 1985, at the age of 69.
