= Oleksandr Dovhach =

Ukrainian military pilot (1973–2026)

Oleksandr Ivanovych Dovhach (Ukrainian: Олександр Іванович Довгач; 12 May 1973 – 9 March 2026) was a Ukrainian military pilot, Hero of Ukraine (2025).

== Life and career ==
Dovhach was born 12 May 1973 in Chernihiv. In 1990 he graduated from school No. 29, after which he studied at the Chernihiv Higher Military Aviation School of Pilots.

As of March 2010, he had the rank of senior navigator of the aviation brigade, was stationed in the Kyiv region, pilot of the 2nd class.

In 2022, he was part of the 831st Tactical Aviation Brigade, providing cover for strike and bomber aircraft, destroyed enemy drones and missiles. He took part in the battles for Kyiv Oblast, Kharkiv Oblast, Kherson Oblast, and Snake Island.

Dovhach was appointed Commander of the 39th Tactical Aviation Brigade, and died on 9 March 2026, at the age of 52, while performing a combat mission over eastern Ukraine.

== Awards ==
- 2015: Order of Danylo Halytskyi — for personal courage, conscientious and impeccable service to the Ukrainian people, exemplary performance of military duty.
- 2022: Order of Bohdan Khmelnytsky III degree — for personal courage and selfless actions shown in the defense of state sovereignty and territorial integrity of Ukraine, loyalty to the military oath.
- 2023: Order of Bohdan Khmelnytsky II degree — for personal courage shown in the defense of state sovereignty and territorial integrity of Ukraine, selfless performance of military duty.
- 2024: Order of Bohdan Khmelnytsky I degree — for personal courage shown in the defense of state sovereignty and territorial integrity of Ukraine, selfless performance of military duty.
- 2025: Hero of Ukraine with the Order of the Golden Star — for personal courage and heroism shown in the defense of state sovereignty and territorial integrity of Ukraine, selfless service to the Ukrainian people.
