= Dmytro Kolomiiets =

Ukrainian fighter pilot (1974–2022)

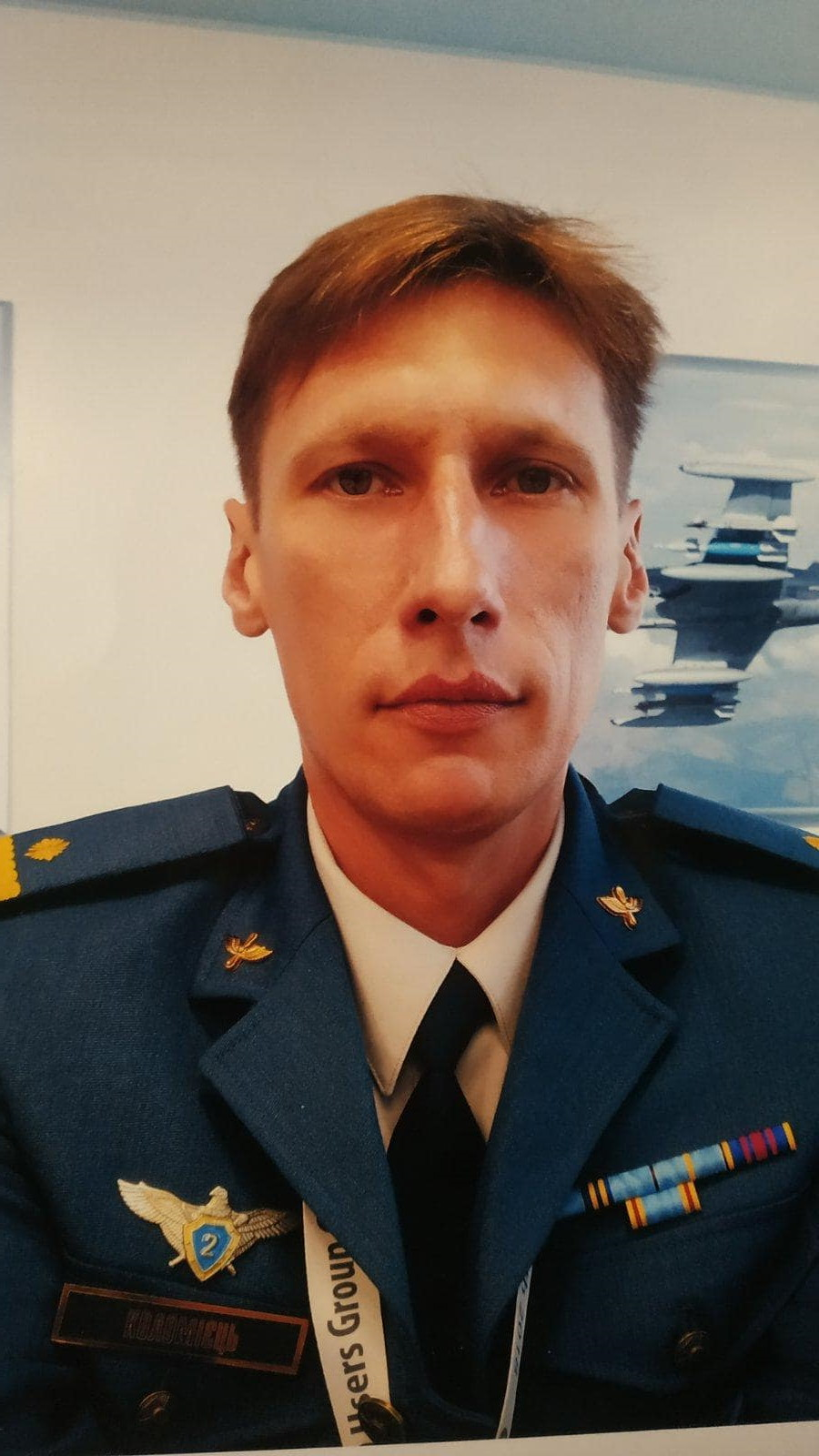
- Born: Dmytro Valeriiovych Kolomiiets; 5 December 1973; Bila Tserkva, Kyiv Oblast, Ukraine
- Died: 24 February 2022 (aged 48) Kryntsiliv, Khmelnytskyi Oblast, Ukraine
- Allegiance: Ukraine
- Branch: Ukrainian Air Force
- Rank: Major
- Conflicts: Russo-Ukrainian War; Russian invasion of Ukraine
- Awards: Hero of Ukraine
- Education: Chernihiv Higher Military Aviation School of Pilots
- Children: 1

Dmytro Valeriiovych Kolomiiets (Ukrainian: Дмитро Валерійович Коломієць; December 5, 1973, Bila Tserkva, Kyiv Oblast - February 24, 2022, Kryntsiliv, Khmelnytskyi Oblast) was a Ukrainian military fighter pilot (Major). He was awarded the title of Hero of Ukraine (2022, posthumously).

== Early life ==
He was born on December 5, 1973, in the city of Bila Tserkva, Kyiv Oblast. The choice of profession for Dmytro was obvious, as almost everyone in his family had a military background. His grandmother served in the air defense forces, and his father was a military pilot, so his childhood was spent around airfields and military bases. He graduated from Ozerne Gymnasium.

From 1980 to 1990, he attended Ozerne Secondary School.

In 1990, he enrolled in the Chernihiv Higher Military Aviation School of Pilots and upon completion, he was assigned to serve in Ozerne. He mastered the Su-27, MiG-29, and L-39 aircraft.

On February 24, 2022, he encountered the enemy as one of the first. From early morning, while most Ukrainians were still peacefully asleep and unaware that a large-scale war had begun, Dmytro engaged in aerial combat in the airspace of Ukraine over Khmelnytskyi. Heroically, he drew the enemy's fire towards himself while carrying out his mission in an L-39 aircraft, thus saving his comrades. While allowing the rest of the combat group to pass, his plane was shot down by enemy forces near the village of Kryntsiliv, Khmelnytskyi Oblast.

He was laid to rest in the village of Skomorokhy in Zhytomyr Oblast.

He is survived by his wife and daughter.

== Awards ==
The title of Hero of Ukraine with the award of the Order of the Golden Star (February 28, 2022, posthumously) was bestowed upon him for personal courage and heroism demonstrated in the defense of Ukraine's state sovereignty and territorial integrity, as well as for his loyalty to the military oath.
