= Brian Walpole =

British aviator

Brian Owen Walpole OBE, FRAeS is a pilot who was the General Manager with responsibility for Concorde with British Airways.

Walpole started his career in aviation by joining the RAF in 1952. In his four years' service, he served as an operational fighter squadron pilot, flying Meteors, and was also a member of the Fighter Command formation aerobatic team, giving displays all over Europe.

In 1956, he joined BOAC, which was later to merge with BEA to become British Airways. Initially as a First Officer on the Argonaut fleet and later as the first training co-pilot in BOAC, in 1971 he was promoted to command, becoming Fleet Captain of the 707 Fleet in 1972.

In 1975, he commanded the Boeing 707 aircraft used for the Royal Tour to the Far East, which the Queen undertook, and a year later he transferred to the Concorde Fleet. In 1977, he commanded the Concorde that flew the Queen from Barbados to London and the first supersonic commercial service from London to New York City. His achievements were recognised in 1978 when he was awarded the Britannia Trophy, presented by the Prince of Wales (now King Charles III), for his work on the launch of the Concorde New York service.

In 1982, he became the General Manager of the Concorde Division at British Airways and was responsible for all aspects of Concorde operations, from marketing and advertising to control of the fleet's day-to-day operations.

His achievements in aviation were again recognised in 1983 when he was elected a Fellow of the Royal Aeronautical Society, and two years later he was granted the Freedom of the City of London. In 1988, he was appointed an Officer of the Order of the British Empire in the Queen's Birthday Honours.

In July 1988, Walpole was grounded by British Airways for landing a transatlantic Concorde at Heathrow with 25 minutes of reserve fuel remaining, instead of 30 minutes' worth. Walpole had the option to divert to Shannon airport to refuel, but had not done so.

He barrel rolled the Concorde during testing, along with another test pilot, Jean Franchi.
