= Ozerne, Zhytomyr Oblast =

Rural locality in Zhytomyr Oblast, Ukraine

Ozerne Озерне
- Rural settlement
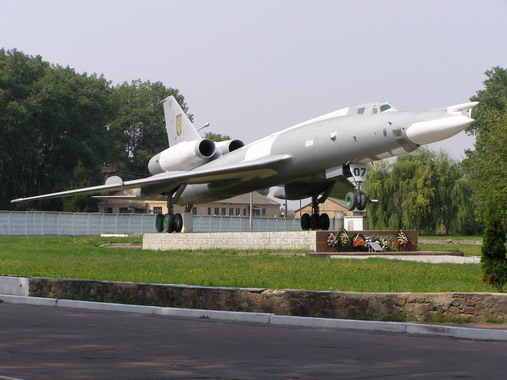
- Monument to Aviators at the entrance to Ozerne
- Interactive map of Ozerne
- Location of Ozerne in Zhytomyr Oblast Location of Ozerne in Ukraine
- Coordinates: 50°10′53″N 28°44′9″E
- Country: Ukraine
- Oblast: Zhytomyr
- Raion: Zhytomyr
- Hromada: Novohuivynske Settlement Hromada
- Founded: 1959

Government
  - Mayor: Zoya Honcharenko

Area
  - Total: 1.56 km^{2} (0.60 sq mi)
- Elevation: 219 m (719 ft)

Population (2022)
  - Total: 5,717
  - Density: 3,660/km^{2} (9,490/sq mi)
- Post code: 12443
- Area code: +380 412

Ozerne (Ukrainian: Озерне; Belarusian: Азэрнэ) is a rural settlement in Zhytomyr Raion, Zhytomyr Oblast, Ukraine. Population: 5,717 (2022 estimate). In 2001, population was 5,913. It is home to a military air base.

== History ==
Until 26 January 2024, Ozerne was designated urban-type settlement. On this day, a new law entered into force which abolished this status, and Ozerne became a rural settlement.
