= Ozerne Air Base =

Air base in Zhytomyr Oblast, Ukraine

Ozerne Air Base
- Ozerne, Zhytomyr Oblast in Ukraine
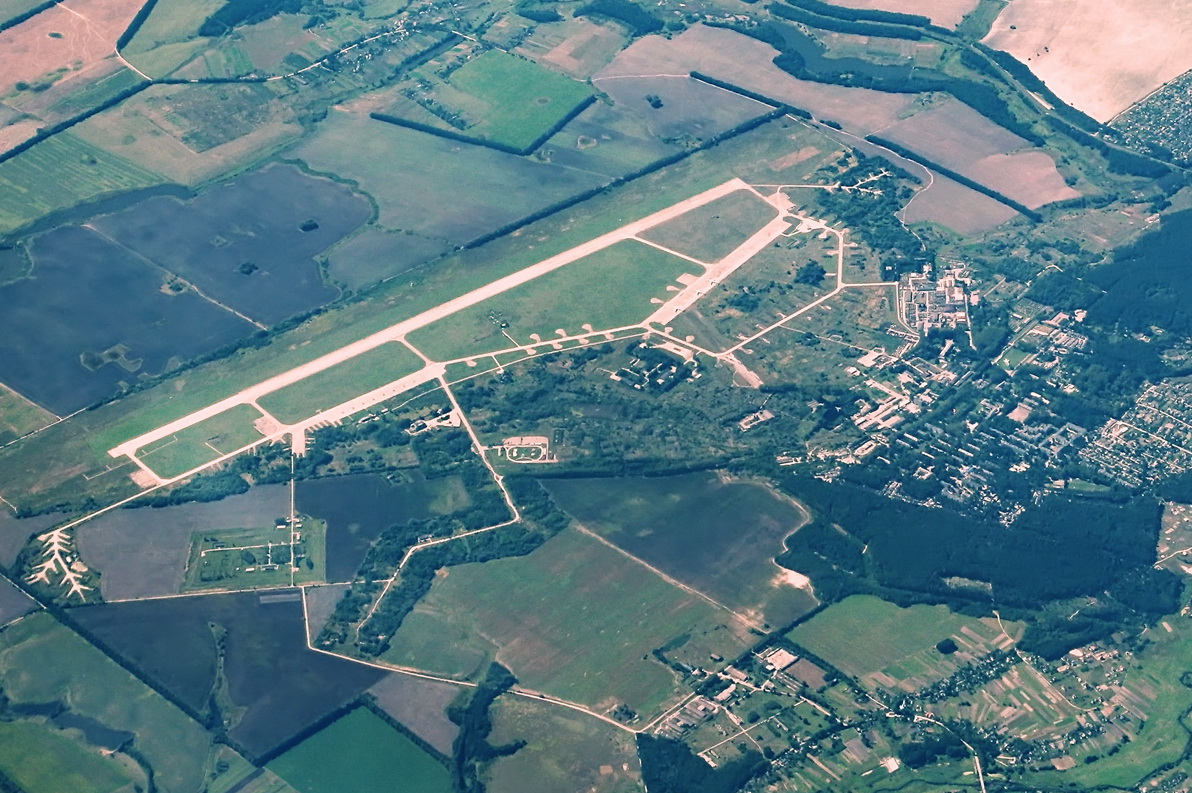
- Ozerne air base during June 2013

Site information
- Type: Air Base
- Owner: Ministry of Defence
- Operator: Ukrainian Air Force

Location
- Shown within Zhytomyr Oblast Ozerne (Ukraine)
- Coordinates: 50°9′30″N 028°44′18″E

Site history
- Built: 1933
- In use: 1933 - present
- Battles/wars: 2022 Russian invasion of Ukraine

Airfield information
- Identifiers: ICAO: UKKO
- Elevation: 83 metres (272 ft) AMSL
Runways
Direction	Length and surface
11/29	3,050 metres (10,007 ft) Concrete

Ozerne (ICAO: UKKO) is an air base of the Ukrainian Air Force located near Ozerne, Zhytomyr Oblast, Ukraine.

The base is home to the 39th Tactical Aviation Brigade flying Sukhoi Su-27UB and Aero L-39C Albatross aircraft.

Ozerne (Ukrainian: Озерне, given in source material under the plethora of names: Zhytomyr Ozerna, Ozernyy, Ozernoye, Oziernoye, Ozernoe, Ozernoye, Ozyornoye, Ozyornaya, and in US intelligence as Zhitomir/Skomorokhi).

== History ==
The airbase was erected 1933 by the Red Army and expanded 1942 by the German Luftwaffe and was called Flughafen Hegewald. Nearby were the headquarters of Heinrich Himmler and the base was surrounded by the settlements of the new German Hegewald colony. 15th Guards Heavy Bomber Aviation Division was stationed at the base from 1945 to 1994. In 1965 Ozerne began receiving Tupolev Tu-22 (Blinder) aircraft. By 1967 it had 31 Tu-22 aircraft, and in 1968 it received Tu-22PD aircraft. A Tu-22 crash-landed here in 1969 due to a stall during the landing flare; this incident was captured by a movie camera and used in the motion picture Tenderness for the Roaring Beast.

In December 1989 the 251st Guards Heavy Bomber Aviation Regiment (Bila Tserkva, Kyiv Oblast) with Tu-16K were transferred under the control of the 43rd Center for Combat Employment and Retraining of Personnel of Long Range Aviation, located in the Russian SFSR. In 1990 the division comprised the:

- 121st Guards Heavy Bomber Aviation Regiment (Machulishchi, Minsk Oblast, Belarusian SSR) with Tu-22K
- 203rd Guards Heavy Bomber Aviation Regiment (Baranavichi, Brest Oblast, Belarusian SSR) with Tu-22K
- 341st Heavy Bomber Aviation Regiment (Ozerne) with Tu-22K

With the breakup of the Soviet Union in 1991, the two regiments in Belarus were transferred to other commands and the 251st Regiment rejoined the division. Units stationed at Ozernoye include the:

- 894th Fighter Aviation Regiment. This regiment was part of 28th Air Defence Corps of the 8th Air Defence Army (April 1986-January 1992). By 1994 under Ukraine resubordinated to Western Region Air Defence.
- 341st Heavy Bomber Aviation Regiment (341 TBAP) flying Tu-22M2 from 1965 until the 1990s and Tu-22PD from 1968 until the 1990s, and the Tu-22UD as recently as 1991. Under 15th Guards Heavy Bomber Aviation Division from 1950 to 1992, (Holm) and at least up to 1994 (AFM March 1994).

In 2006 the airfield was home to about 15 fighter aircraft visible in Google Earth high-resolution imagery. The north airfield appeared to contain a huge army salvage yard.

Since 2018 the base is the home of the 39th Tactical Aviation Brigade of the Ukrainian Air Force.

A Sukhoi Su-27 crash landed on December 15, 2018, while approaching the airfield during a training flight. The pilot, Maj. Oleksandr Fomenko, did not survive the crash.

During the opening hours of the Russian invasion of Ukraine on 24 February 2022, a Su-27 and refueling vehicle were destroyed at apron as a result of Russian missile strike.
