= Slow roll (aeronautics) =

Aircraft manoeuvre

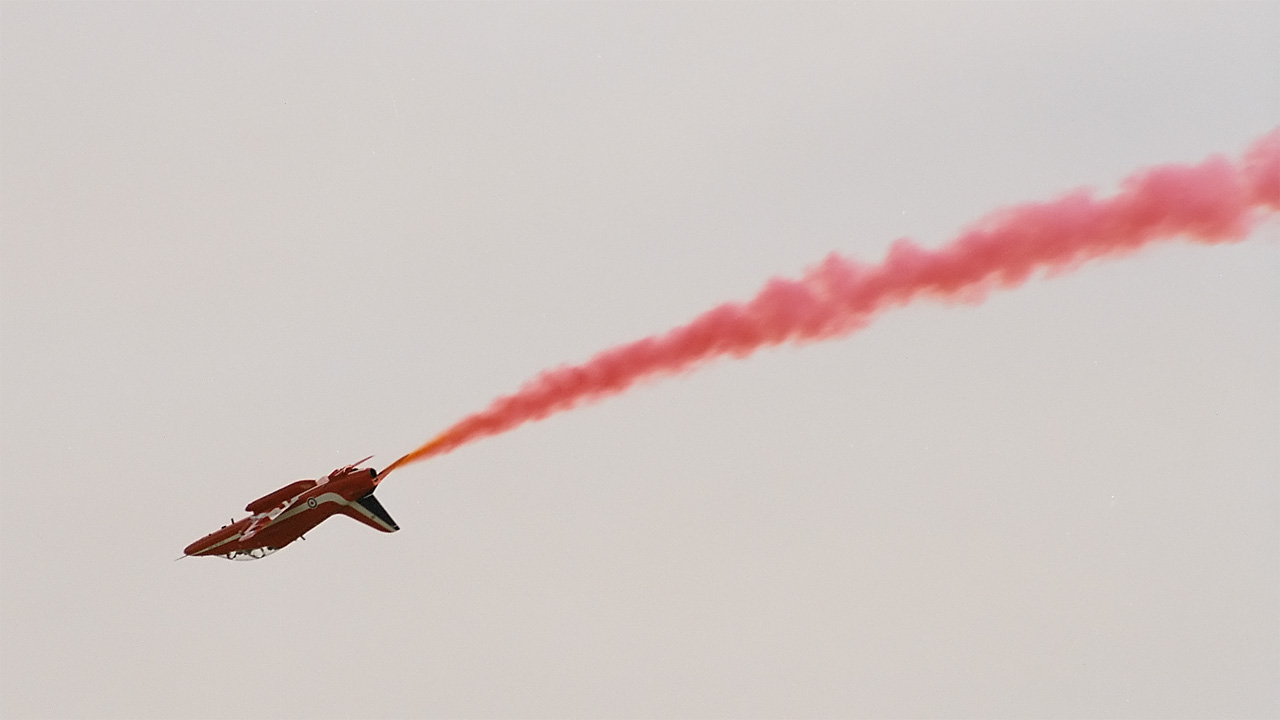
A slow roll

A slow roll is a roll made by an airplane, in which the plane makes a complete rotation around its roll axis while keeping the aircraft flying a straight and level flightpath. A slow roll is performed more slowly than an aileron roll; although it is not necessarily performed very slowly, it is performed slowly enough to allow the pilot to maintain balance, keeping a steady flightpath, pitch angle (nose attitude), and height (altitude) throughout the maneuver. The maneuver is performed by rolling the airplane at a controlled rate with the ailerons, and moving the elevators and rudder in opposition, or "cross-controlling," to keep the plane on a steady, level flightpath.

== Introduction ==
A slow roll is an aerobatic maneuver in which an airplane makes a controlled roll by rotating about its longitudinal axis. It is performed by rolling the aircraft at a constant rate, while manipulating the control surfaces to maintain level flight. The maneuver consists of quickly moving the aileron input to a desired position (usually less than full) and holding it steady while constantly varying the elevator and rudder inputs, counteracting the force of gravity. Due to the difficulty of maintaining level flight while slowly rolling, the slow roll is often used as an aerobatic training-maneuver, teaching the pilot to coordinate the movements of all three surfaces (elevators, ailerons, and rudder) simultaneously.

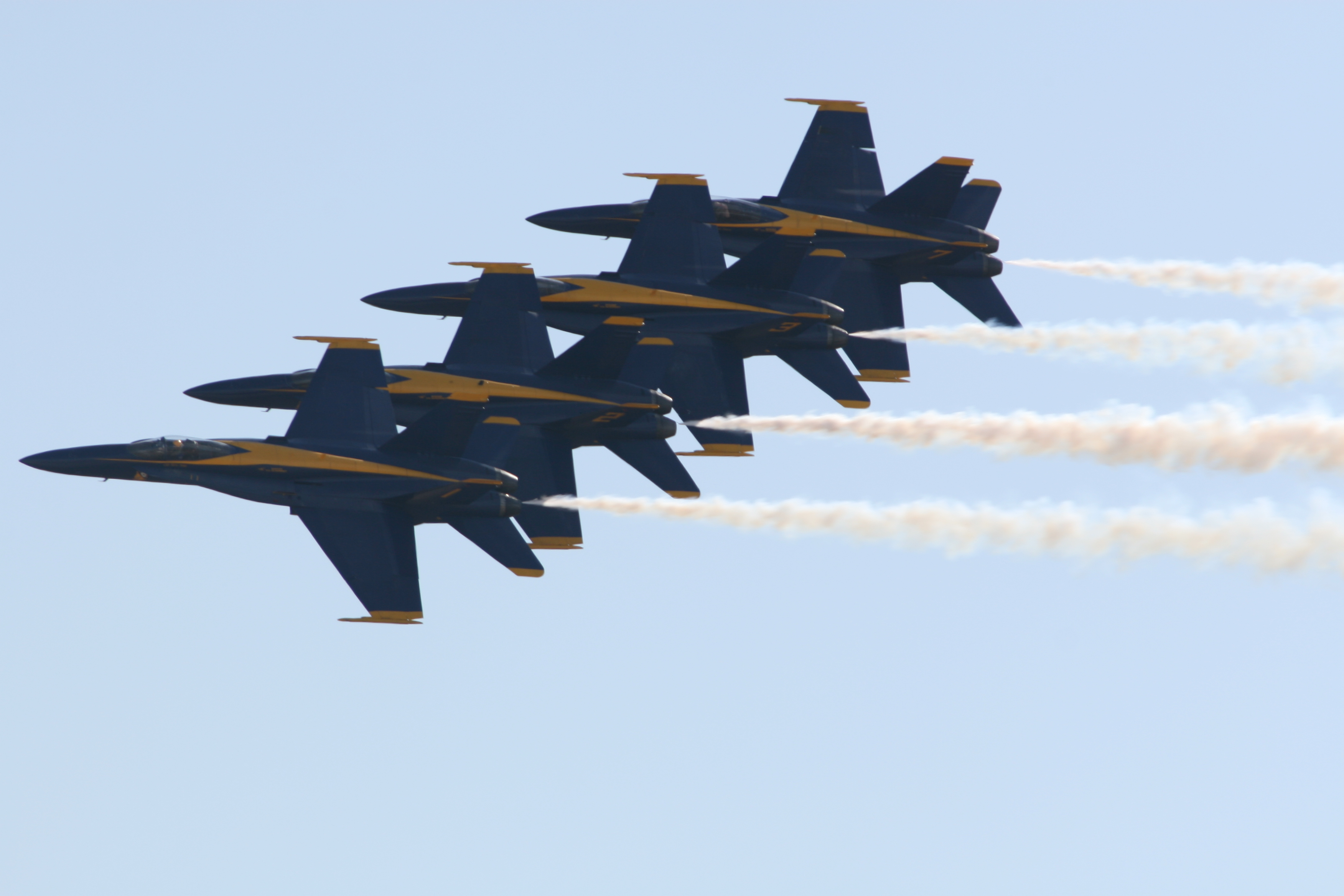
Slow rolls being performed by the Blue Angels while in formation.

The slow roll appears similar to the aileron roll, except the roll rate is typically slower, and both the aircraft attitude and altitude are held consistent throughout the maneuver. The slow roll produces a constantly shifting load of one g-force on both the pilot and the aircraft, from one g positive in the upright position to one g negative in the inverted, caused by gravity. At the midpoint of the roll, the pilot will be hanging upside-down by the seatbelt, and any loose debris in the cockpit will fall to the canopy or out of the plane.

The rate at which a slow roll can be performed is often determined by skill of the pilot. The better the pilot; the faster the roll can be performed. The slow roll is often used in aerobatic competitions and shows, displaying the pilot's ability to control the plane. Most rolls performed by fighter aircraft are slow rolls or partial slow-rolls, as opposed to an uncontrolled aileron roll, and this is especially true when flying in formation. A variation of the slow roll is the "hesitation roll," in which the pilot stops the roll at various "points" during the maneuver, maintaining a level flightpath at whatever angle of bank for a short time, such as 90 degrees (wings-vertical), 135 degrees (partly inverted) or 180 degrees (fully inverted). The pilot will then continue the roll to the next point, hesitating again. Such a roll may consist of any number of points, which are usually evenly spaced, with the most common being the two-point, three-point, and four-point rolls. However, the difficulty in maintaining level flight at the various angles requires the pilot to fully master the slow roll before attempting a hesitation roll.

== Execution ==
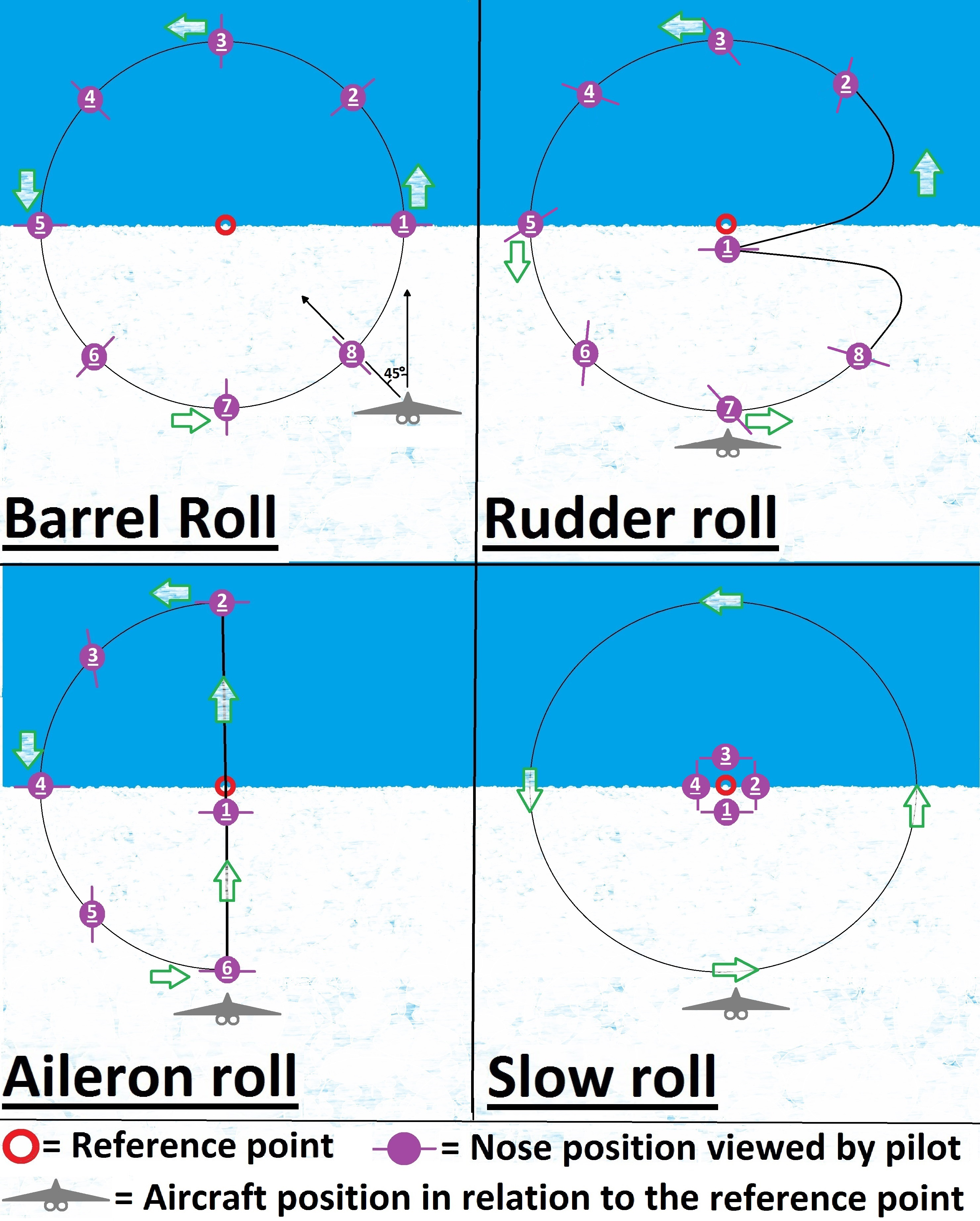
A slow roll as seen from the pilot's perspective, when in comparison with other types of rolls.

A slow roll typically begins from level flight. The pilot will usually begin the roll by pitching the aircraft up slightly, generally about 5 to 20 degrees above the horizon. The purpose of the pitch-up is to create a greater angle of attack, which will allow both the inverted wing and the fuselage to generate lift. The pilot then holds this attitude while applying aileron input, by carefully moving the stick to either the right or the left. As the aircraft begins to roll, the pilot will need to apply the rudder in the direction of the bank, to counter adverse yaw (the tendency of the nose to yaw away from the bank). As the airplane rolls past 45 degrees of bank, it will start to lose lift and the nose will begin to drop to the plane's side, so the pilot begins to apply rudder in the opposite direction (away from the bank) to hold the nose at a constant attitude, increasing the input as the plane rolls toward 90 degrees, while, at the same time, releasing elevator input. In the wings-vertical position, the elevators should be neutral and attitude held by rudder alone, and the only lift generated at this point will be from the sides of the fuselage and the upward vector of the engine thrust.

As the aircraft begins to roll from wings-vertical to inverted, the rudder will need to be slowly relaxed to keep the airplane from veering off course. However, the nose will continue to try dropping so, as the rudder is slowly relaxed, negative elevator must be slowly applied, taking over the job of holding the nose attitude and keeping the plane in level flight. This is done by carefully pushing the stick forward at the same time the rudder pedal is being released. When in the completely inverted position, the rudder should be in the neutral position and the attitude maintained by elevator only. As the plane continues to roll wings-vertical, the rudder will need to slowly be applied while the elevator is relaxed, and all of this needs to be done while maintaining constant aileron input. As the plane continues the roll to wings-level, upright flight, the rudder will need to be carefully released as positive elevator is applied.

An improperly performed slow roll can easily result in a change in heading. Before performing the roll, the pilot will often pick a reference point on the horizon, located just above the nose of the plane. To keep a constant heading and attitude, the pilot will usually try to hold this reference point in a constant position over the nose as the horizon rotates around it. A slow roll can easily result in the aircraft falling out of the maneuver, so the pilot will usually need to ensure that the plane has sufficient altitude to recover if such an event occurs.

=== Hesitation roll ===
A hesitation roll is executed by performing a slow roll, but stopping the roll at various angles of bank momentarily. This requires that the pilot add aileron movement to the maneuver, instead of just holding the ailerons steady. When the plane reaches the desired angle of bank, the pilot must quickly release the aileron input, by moving the stick from the side to the center, while holding the elevator and rudder inputs steady to keep a level flightpath. After the hesitation, the pilot quickly moves the stick to the side, resuming the roll at the same rate. As the roll resumes, the pilot will need to continue holding the ailerons steady while cross-controlling the rudder and elevators until the next point is reached.

A hesitation roll can theoretically consist of an infinite number of stopping points during the roll, but rarely does one contain more than eight. The most common rolls are the two, three, and four-point rolls. In a two-point roll, the aircraft stops rolling when inverted, and resumes the roll to the upright position. In a three-point roll, the plane stops when partially inverted (120 degrees), rolls past inverted, and stops again when partially inverted (240 degrees) before continuing to roll upright. A four-point roll is accomplished by rolling 90 degrees, then rolling to 180 degrees, to 270, and then upright. A properly performed hesitation roll requires precise control and timing of the control-surface inputs to hold the plane on a straight and level flightpath.
