= EnBW =

Publicly-traded energy company headquartered in Karlsruhe, Germany

EnBW Energie Baden-Württemberg AG
- Type: Aktiengesellschaft
- Traded as: FWB: EBK
- Industry: Electric utilities
- Predecessor: Badenwerk; Mittelschwäbische Überlandzentrale; Neckarwerke Elektrizitätsversorgung; Ueberlandwerk Jagstkreis; Württembergische Landes-Elektrizitäts-AG
- Founded: 1997
- Headquarters: Karlsruhe, Germany
- Key people: Dr. Georg Stamatelopoulos (CEO)
- Products: Electric power
- Revenue: €56,0 billion (2022)
- Operating income: 3,252,100,000 euro (2023)
- Net income: €1.7 billion (2022)
- Total assets: €69.5 billion (2022)
- Total equity: €12.8 billion (2022)
- Number of employees: 26,980 (2022)
- Website: www.enbw.com

EnBW Energie Baden-Württemberg AG, or simply EnBW, is a publicly traded energy company headquartered in Karlsruhe, Germany. It is the third-largest energy company in Germany, serving approximately 5.5 million customers.

Formed in 1997 through the merger of Badenwerk AG and Energie-Versorgung Schwaben AG, the company has undergone a strategic reorientation toward renewable energy since 2012. EnBW is now a leading developer and operator of offshore and onshore wind farms in Germany and Europe. In addition to electricity generation, the company operates high-voltage transmission grids through its subsidiary TransnetBW and has significantly expanded its infrastructure for electric vehicle charging and photovoltaics.

== History ==
=== Foundation and development ===
EnBW came into existence on 1 January 1997 as a result of the merger between two energy companies from Baden-Württemberg, Badenwerk AG and Energie-Versorgung Schwaben AG (EVS). Subsequently, on 1 October 2003, EnBW further merged with Neckarwerke Stuttgart AG.

=== Strategic reorientation and expansion of renewable energy activities ===
In March 2012, Frank Mastiaux was appointed as the new CEO of EnBW. At the end of 2012, in response to the nuclear power phase-out and the energy transition, Mastiaux announced a strategic reorientation. The proportion of renewable energy sources in EnBW's energy mix was to increase from 12% to 40% by 2020. The figure of 40.1% was reached in 2021. Much of this was to be achieved by expanding wind power: with 1,016 MW onshore and 975 MW offshore, EnBW is now one of the leading wind farm developers and operators in Germany.

Between 2020 and 2025, the company plans to invest over €5 billion in the further expansion of renewable energy generation and aims to operate onshore and offshore wind farms with a total capacity of at least 4,000 MW. EnBW's first offshore wind farm – EnBW Baltic 1, comprising 21 wind turbines in the Baltic Sea – went into operation in 2011. This was followed in early summer 2015 by the 80-turbine EnBW Baltic 2 offshore wind farm, a stake in which had already been sold to Australian investment group Macquarie for €720 million in January 2015. In early 2020, the EnBW Hohe See and Albatros wind farms with a total of 87 turbines and 609 MW capacity went into operation in the North Sea. In 2017, EnBW won bidding for the right to construct its third North Sea wind farm, the 900 MW EnBW He Dreiht, which is unsubsidised and is scheduled for completion in 2025. In January 2019, EnBW acquired seven wind farms in Sweden with a total of 51 turbines and an installed capacity of 105 MW.

EnBW also plans to expand its grids business and make various divestments. An important growth market is Turkey, where EnBW's focus is on hydroelectric power stations and wind farms.

In 2017, EnBW began expanding its electric mobility, photovoltaics and distributed energy generation activities:

In electric mobility, EnBW has collaborated since March 2017 with Tank & Rast, an operator of service areas along the German autobahn network, to expand the provision of charging points for electric vehicles. EnBW provides the EnBW mobility+ app, which combines a charging point locator with payment options and covers Germany, Austria, Switzerland, France, Italy and the Netherlands. According to an independent study by P3, Cirrantic and Theon Data, EnBW has the largest charging network spanning Germany, Austria and Switzerland. In 2020, the company extended its market leadership in fast charging to Austria by entering into a joint venture with SMATRICS called SMATRICS EnBW. In April 2021, EnBW announced plans to open Europe's biggest public fast charging park for electric vehicles by the end of the year.

In photovoltaics and distributed energy generation, EnBW aims to expand photovoltaic generating capacity to 1,200 MWp by 2025, mainly in Germany but also in selected markets elsewhere. In this connection, EnBW is building Germany's largest unsubsidised solar farm with an area of 164 hectares in Brandenburg and in March 2018 acquired Senec, a Leipzig-based manufacturer of home solar battery storage systems.

In March 2023, EnBW announced that it intends to end coal usage by 2028.

In August 2023, it was announced EnBW had acquired a 10% equity stake in a renewable ammonia production plant developed by Norwegian company Skipavika Green Ammonia (SkiGA).

=== Internationalisation of renewable energy activities ===
The EnBW 2025 Strategy includes selective internationalisation of the company's renewable energy activities. EnBW has a presence in Denmark through its subsidiary Connected Wind Services and in Sweden in the form of EnBW Sverige. In June 2019, EnBW completed the acquisition of Valeco, France. The company has a renewable energy joint venture in Turkey in partnership with Borusan. EnBW has also opened offices of its own in Taiwan and the United States in order to bid in offshore wind auctions. Early in 2021, EnBW and BP jointly won an auction for rights to develop offshore wind farms in two adjacent areas of the Irish Sea.

=== Transmission grid ===
In 2023, EnBW sold around a quarter of its high-voltage transmission grid TransnetBW to a savings banks-led consortium for around 1 billion euros ($1.1 billion). Also in 2023, state-owned KfW acquired a 24.95% minority stake in TransnetBW, firming up its grip on critical energy infrastructure in a bid to speed up the country's energy transition.

== Sports sponsorship ==
EnBW was the main sponsor of football clubs VfB Stuttgart and Karlsruher SC for several years until 2010 and continues to sponsor both clubs at a lesser level.

== Structure ==
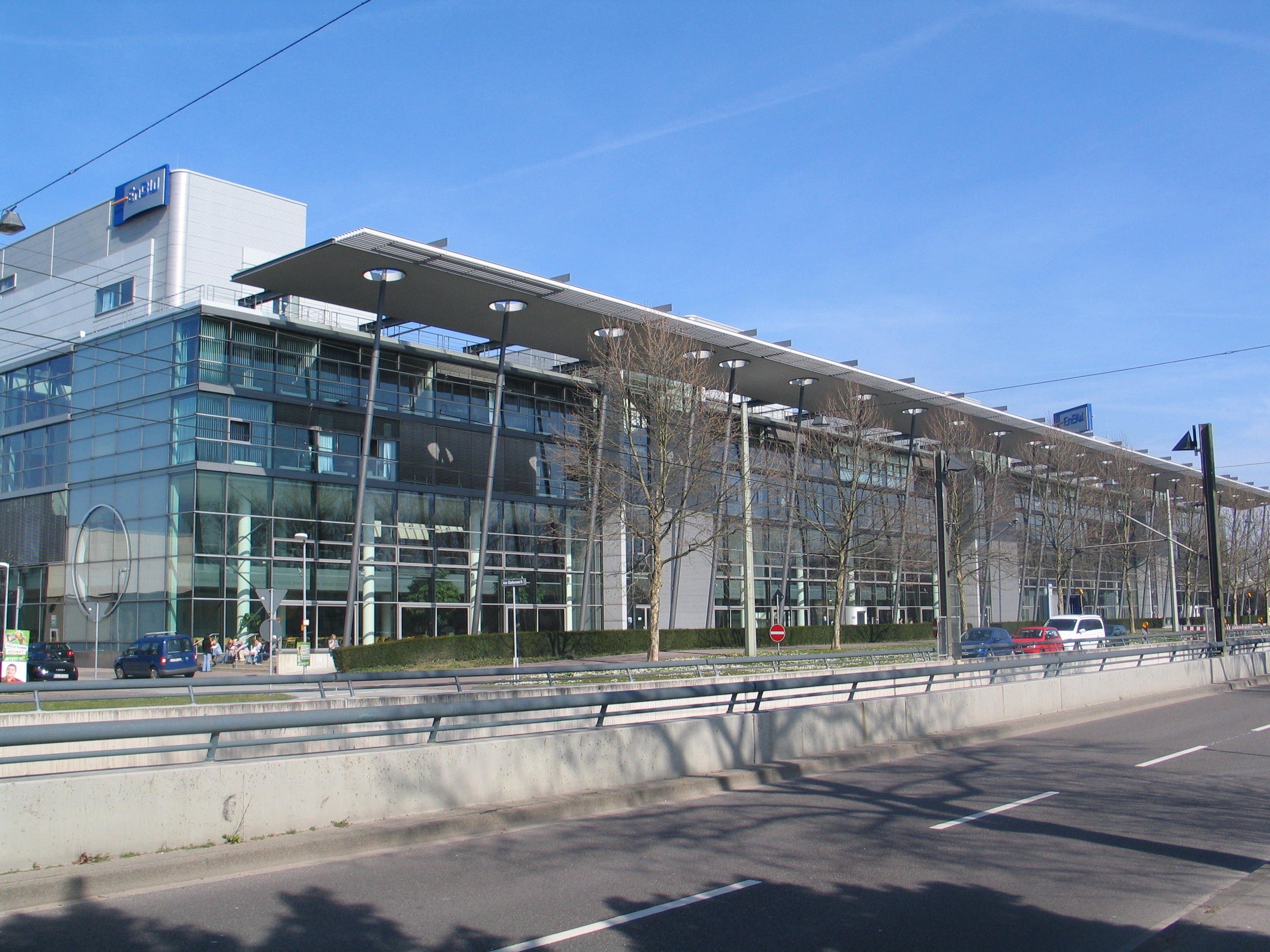
EnBW headquarters in Karlsruhe

=== Shareholders ===
The two principal shareholders of EnBW are NECKARPRI-Beteiligungsgesellschaft mbH (itself fully owned by the state of Baden-Württemberg) and Oberschwäbische Elektrizitätswerke (OEW, owned by local municipalities), each of which hold a 46.75% ownership interest.

=== Board of Management ===
The Board of Management (Vorstand) of the EnBW holding company consists of Andreas Schell (Chief Executive Officer since 15 November 2022), Colette Rückert-Hennen (Chief Human Resources Officer), Thomas Kusterer (Chief Financial Officer), Dirk Gusewill (Chief Operating Officer Critical Infrastructure) and Georg Stamatelopoulos (Chief Operating Officer Generation).

=== Figures ===
EnBW has around 5.5 million customers and is the third-largest energy company in Germany. With a workforce of 26,980, EnBW generated revenue of €56,0 billion in 2022.

==== Carbon intensity ====
Year	Generation portfolio electrical output in MW	CO2 Intensity in g/kWh
2018	13,387	553
2019	13,849	419
2020	12,486	342
2021	12,722	478
2022	13,066	491

== Facilities ==
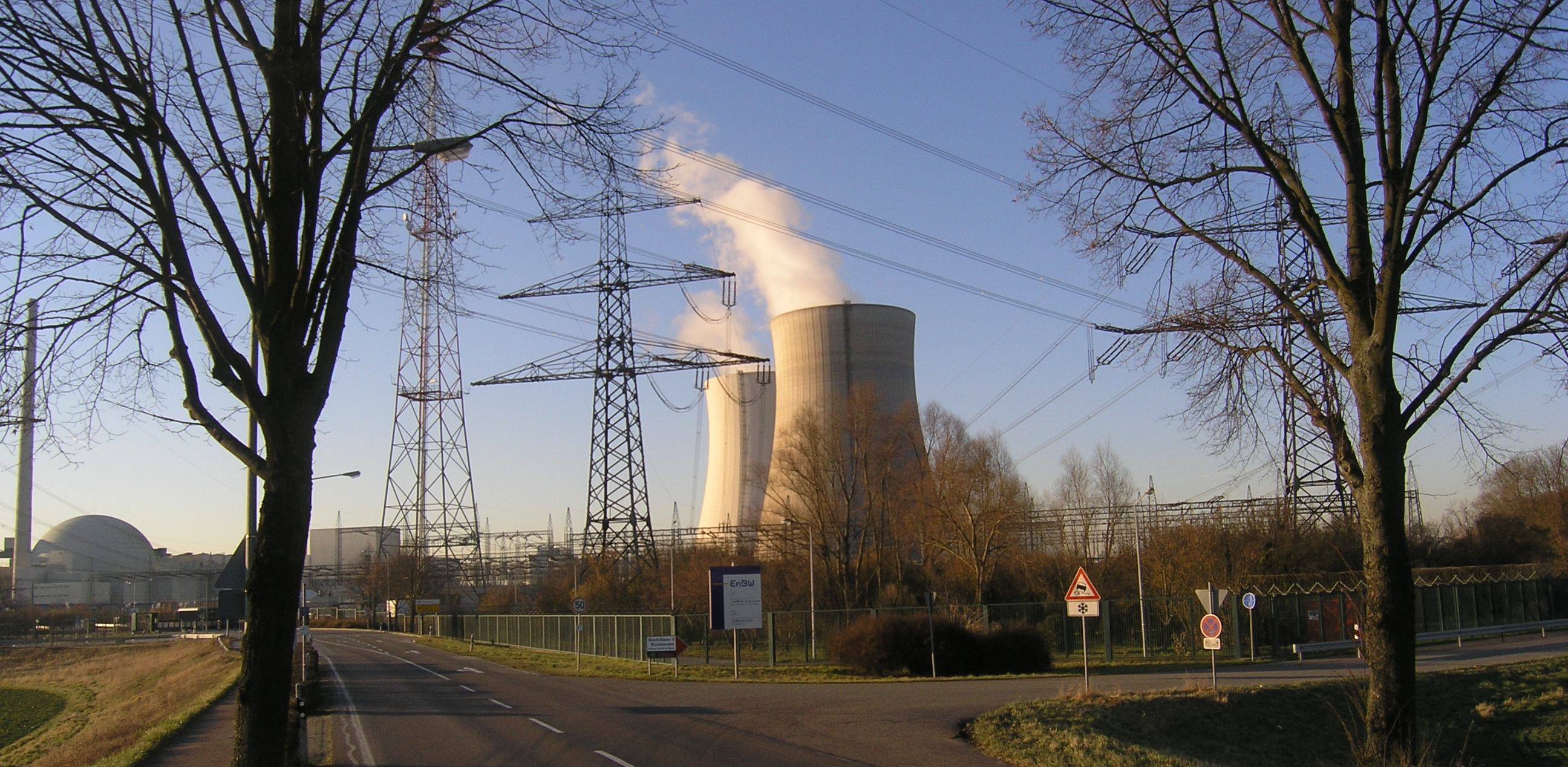
Philippsburg Nuclear Power Plant

=== Nuclear power plants ===
- Neckarwestheim Nuclear Power Plant (decommissioned)
- Obrigheim Nuclear Power Plant (decommissioned)
- Philippsburg Nuclear Power Plant (decommissioned)

=== Conventional power plants ===
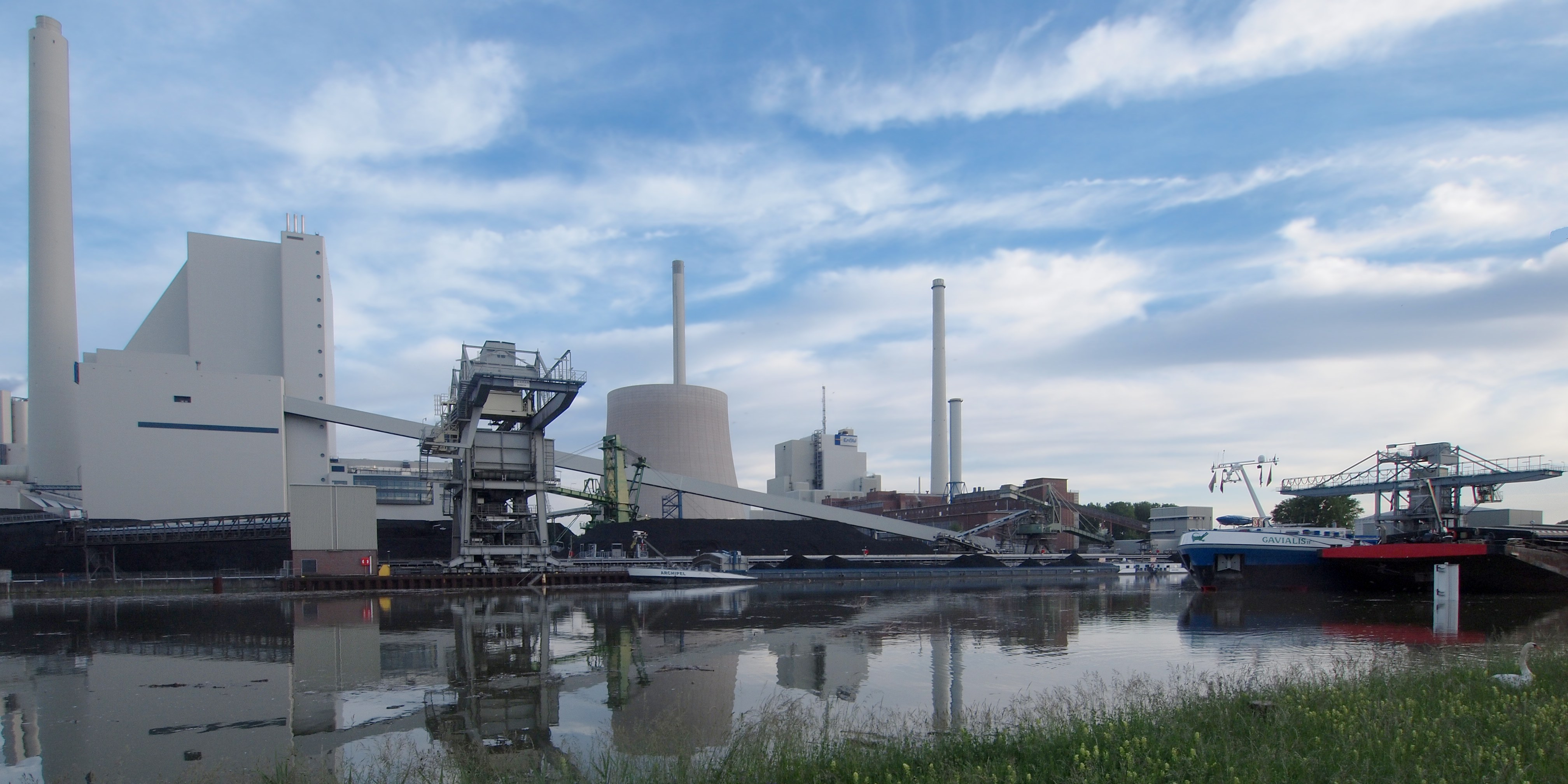
Rheinhafen-Dampfkraftwerk Karlsruhe

- Altbach coal power plant
- Heilbronn coal power plant
- Marbach am Neckar oil power plant
- Walheim coal power plant
- Stuttgart-Gaisburg gas power plant
- Stuttgart-Münster steam power plant (biofuels and coal)
- Rheinhafen-Dampfkraftwerk Karlsruhe coal and gas turbine plant

=== Renewable energy sources: hydropower ===
- Glems (Metzingen) pumped storage plant
- Schluchsee pumped storage plant
- Rheinfelden (Baden) hydroelectric power plant

=== Renewable energy sources: offshore wind farms ===
- EnBW Baltic 1 Offshore Wind Farm (Baltic Sea, 16 kilometres north of the Darss-Zingst peninsula)
- EnBW Baltic 2 (Baltic Sea, 32 kilometres north of the island of Rügen)
- EnBW Hohe See and Albatros (North Sea; Hohe See approximately 95 kilometres north of the island of Borkum and 100 kilometres northwest of Heligoland; Albatros 105 kilometres from each coast)

=== Renewable energy sources: onshore wind farms ===
Wind farms and wind power projects in Baden-Württemberg:

- Aalen-Waldhausen
- Ahaberg
- Bad Wildbad
- Burgholz
- Bühlertann
- Dünsbach
- Fichtenau
- Goldboden-Winterbach
- Grömbach
- Hasel
- Häusern
- Königsbronn
- Kupferzell-Goggenbach
- Langenburg
- Oppenau/Lautenbach
- Rosenberg Süd
- Rot am See-Hausen am Bach
- Tautschbuch
- Veringenstadt

Wind farms in other German states:

- Auf der weißen Trisch (Saarland)
- Bad Nauheim (Hesse)
- Buchholz III (Lower Saxony)
- Derental (Lower Saxony)
- Eisenbachhöhen (Westerwald,Rhineland-Palatinate)
- Eppenrod (Rhineland-Palatinate)
- Freckenfeld (Rhineland-Palatinate)
- Hüttersdorf (Saarland)
- Kahlberg near Grasellenbach (Hesse)
- Kannawurf (Thuringia)
- Lauenförde (Lower Saxony)
- Primsbogen (Saarland)
- Reinstädt (Thuringia)
- Schalksmühle (North Rhine-Westphalia)
- Schulenburg III (Lower Saxony)
- Schwienau III (Lower Saxony)
- Silberberg (Hesse)
- Steinheim (North Rhine-Westphalia)
- Webenheim (Saarland)
- Vierherrenwald near Hellertshausen (Rhineland-Palatinate)

Wind farms in other countries:

- Råmmarehemmet in Västergötland (Sweden)
- EnBW also has stakes in onshore wind farms in France through its subsidiary Valeco

=== Renewable energy sources: solar power ===
Solar farms in operation:

- Aitrach (1.5 MW)
- Berghülen (2.7 MW)
- Birkenfeld (5.8 MW)
- Eggesin (10 MW)
- Ingoldingen (4.3 MW)
- Inzigkofen (7.5 MW)
- Kenzingen (2.6 MW)
- Krautheim (0.5 MW)
- Leibertingen (2.1 MW)
- Leibertingen II (5 MW)
- Leutkirch (5 MW)
- Leutkirch II (2.9 MW)
- Leutkirch III (0.75 MW)
- Lindendorf (6.9 MW)
- Löffingen (2.7 MW)
- March-Neuershausen (0.9 MW)
- Müssentin (9.3 MW)
- Ochsenberg/Königsbronn (10 MW)
- Torgau (4.9 MW)
- Tuningen (4.5 MW)
- Ulm-Eggingen (6.5 MW)
- Zwiefaltendorf (5.2 MW)

Solar farms in development:

- Langenenslingen-Wilflingen
- Maßbach
- Sophienhof
- Ulrichshof
- Weesow-Willmersdorf
- Welgesheim

== See also ==
- Gesellschaft für Nuklear-Service
