= LionLink =

LionLink is a proposed 1.8GW HVDC electrical interconnector to link offshore wind farms in the North Sea to the electrical grids in both Great Britain and the Netherlands.

== Current status ==
In planning terms, the project is at the pre-application stage. Statutory consultation is expected to start later in 2025. A final investment decision is expected in 2026. If authorised, the project could be in operation by 2030 or 2032.

== Electrical connections ==
The heart of the network will be an AC/DC converter station built on a platform in Dutch waters in the North Sea. Electrical power from nearby windfarms will be carried on 66kV AC cables to the converter station, where it will be converted to 525kV DC, feeding two separate HVDC cables - one to the Dutch mainland; and one to Great Britain, where it will make landfall at Walberswick in Suffolk. This hybrid offshore asset can also operate as a direct interconnector between the National Grid and the Synchronous grid of Continental Europe.

== Project history ==
LionLink was announced in April 2023.

In February 2025, National Grid announced that the preferred site for landfall was Walberswick.

== See also ==
Kriegers Flak (wind farm)
