= Baltic 1 Offshore Wind Farm =

German offshore wind farm in the Baltic Sea

EnBW Baltic 1
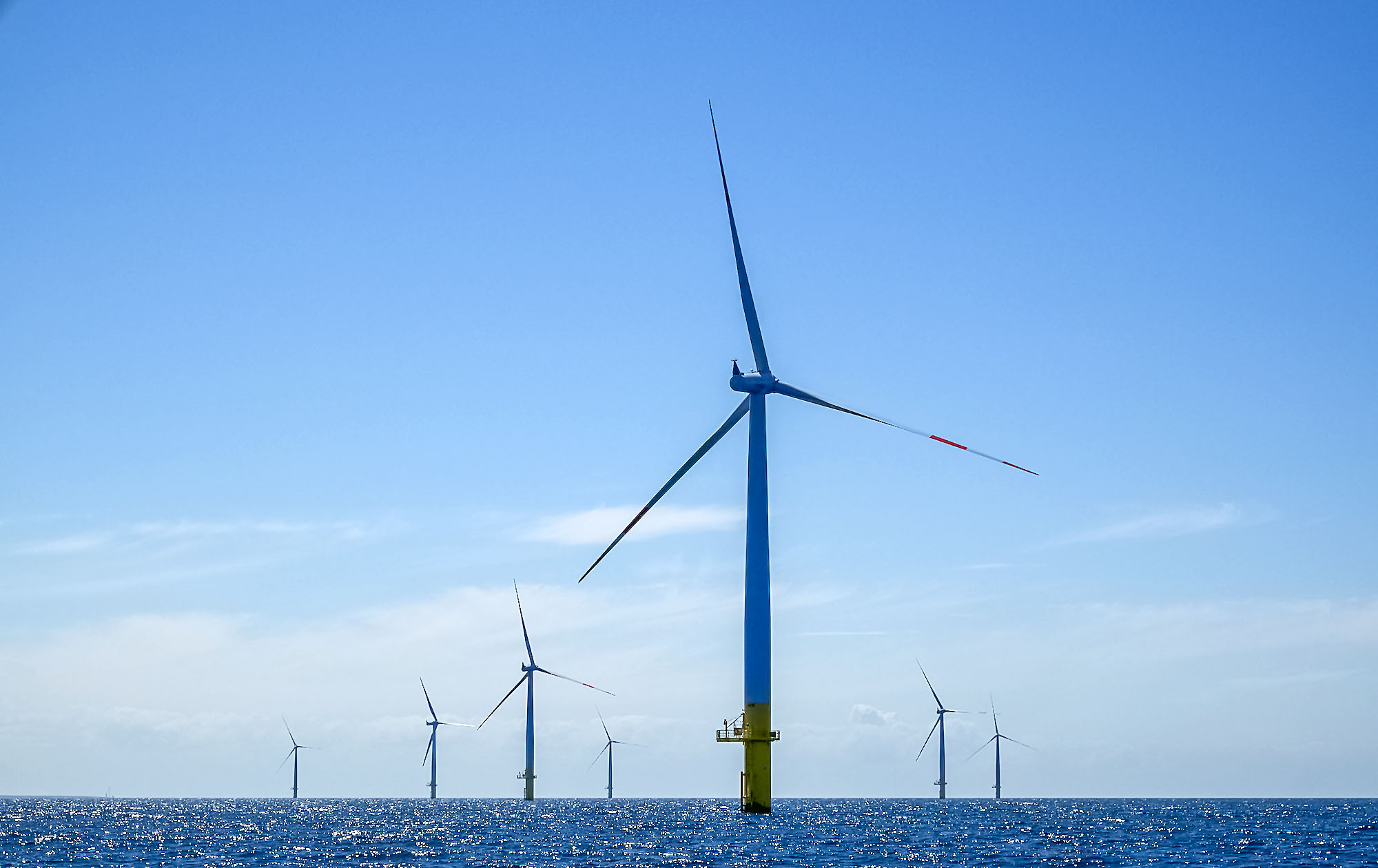
- image of several of the wind turbines
- Country: Germany
- Location: Baltic Sea
- Coordinates: 54°36′50″N 12°40′00″E
- Status: Operational
- Construction began: June 2010
- Commission date: 2 May 2011
- Owner: EnBW

Wind farm
- Type: Offshore
- Distance from shore: 16 km (10 mi)
- Rotor diameter: 93 m (305 ft)
- Site area: 7 km^{2} (3 sq mi)

Power generation
- Units operational: 21 × 2.3 MW
- Make and model: Siemens Gamesa SWT-2.3-93 (21)
- Nameplate capacity: 48.3 MW

External links
- Website: www.baltic1.de
- Commons: Related media on Commons

Wind farm layout

EnBW Baltic 1 is the first commercial offshore wind farm of Germany in the Baltic Sea. Siemens supplied 21 SWT 2.3-93 wind turbines for the 48.3 megawatt wind farm. EnBW Baltic 1 is located about 16 kilometres (9.9 mi) north of the Darss-Zingst Peninsula and covers about seven square kilometers. Work started in July 2010; the wind farm was officially commissioned on 2 May 2011.

Due to the Kriegers Flak Combined Grid Solution, power from Sweden (via Zealand), the 600 MW Kriegers Flak, the 288 MW Baltic 2 is sent via Baltic 1 to Germany, and is synchronized to the Nordic grid (not the German grid) via a 150 kV 400 MW alternating current subsea cable.

== Generation ==
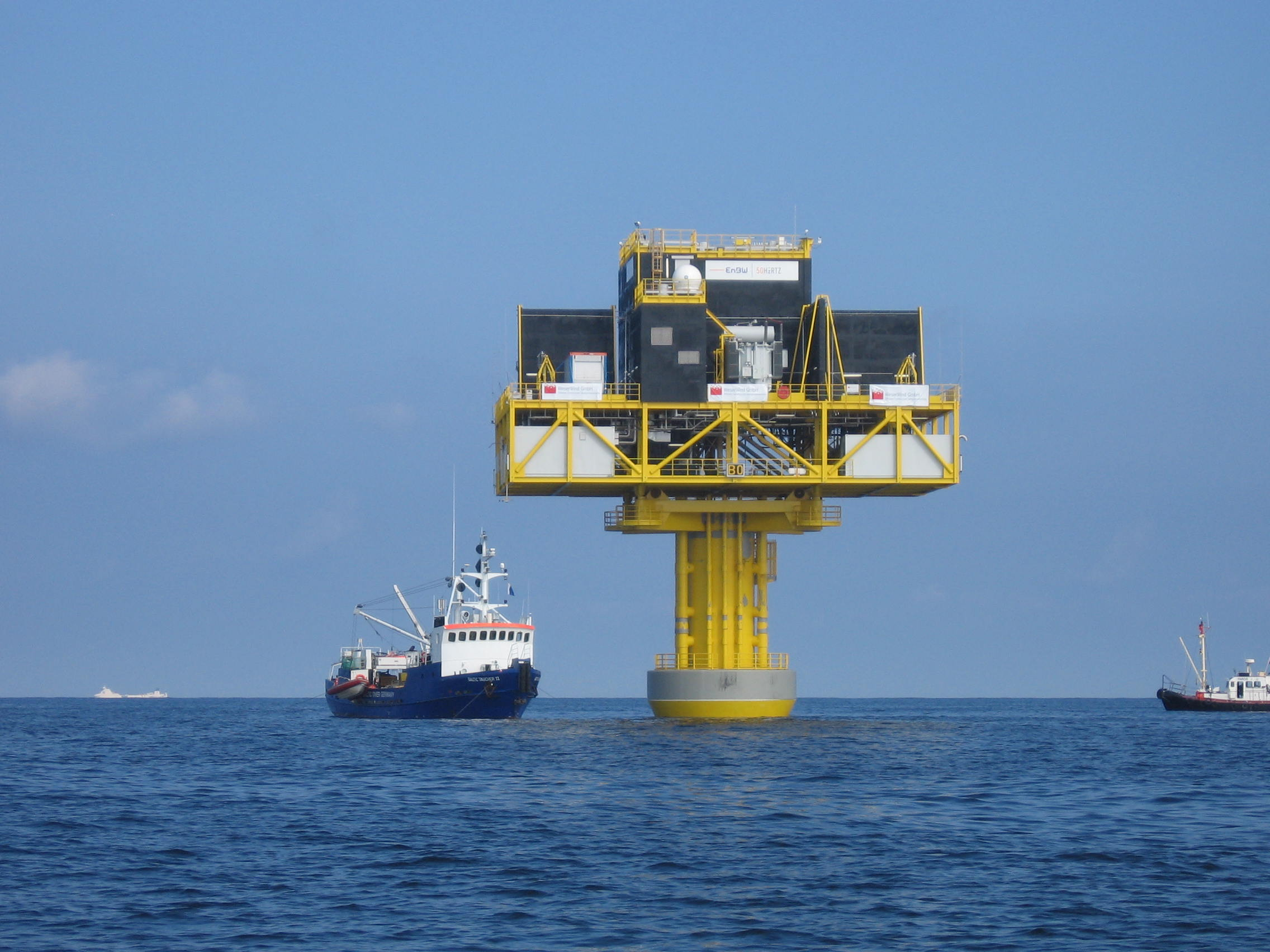
Energy-Substation of EnBW Baltic 1 Offshore windfarm in the Baltic Sea

Baltic 1 production
Year	Production GWh	Full load hours
2012	204	4,224
2013	191	3,954
2014	196	4,048

== See also ==
- Baltic 2 Offshore Wind Farm
- Wind power in Germany
- List of offshore wind farms in Germany
- List of offshore wind farms
- List of offshore wind farms in the Baltic Sea
