= Philippsburg Nuclear Power Plant =

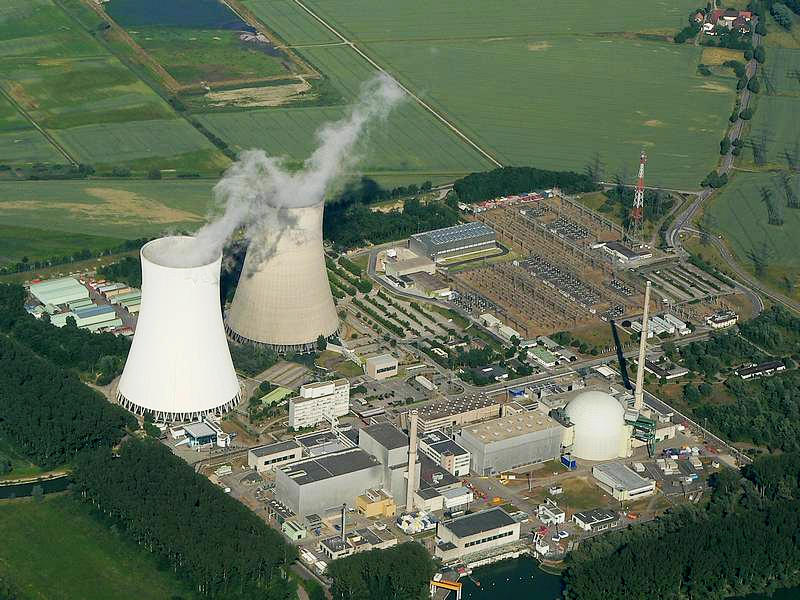
- Country: Germany
- Coordinates: 49°15′9″N 8°26′11″E
- Status: Undergoing decommissioning
- Construction began: 1970
- Commission date: 7 May 1979
- Decommission date: 31 December 2019
- Operator: EnBW
- Cooling towers: 2
- Cooling source: Rhine River

Power generation
- Nameplate capacity: 1,402 MW
- Capacity factor: 89.3%
- Annual net output: 17,845 GWh

External links
- Website: Site of EnBW
- Commons: Related media on Commons

The Philippsburg Nuclear Power Plant is located in Philippsburg, Karlsruhe (district), Germany. The plant was operated by EnBW Kernkraft GmbH. As part of Germany's phase out of nuclear energy (Atomausstieg), unit 1 was shut down in 2011 and unit 2 in 2019. Demolition of conventional structures began in January 2020. The process of decommissioning is underway as of January 2020 beginning with defueling and dismantling of primary coolant lines. The plants operator EnBW expects the decommissioning process to take around 10–15 years. A 400 MW / 800 MWh grid battery is planned at the site, to connect to the Ultranet (powerline).

== History ==
For the first unit, parts made for the cancelled Wyhl plant were used. The second unit was originally planned to be a BWR as well but plans later changed. Final disconnection for both units was scheduled for 2011 for unit 1 and 2017 for unit 2, but as of 2010 had been changed to 2026 and 2032 respectively.

Following the incident at the Fukushima plant in Japan, reactor 1 was closed on 17 March 2011, ten days before the 2011 Baden-Württemberg state election, for a three-month moratorium on nuclear power. The outcome of this moratorium was announced on the morning of 30 May 2011 and Philippsburg-1 was named as a plant that would not be returning to generation at the end of the moratorium.

Subsequent legislation caused the end of Philippsburg-2's operation on the evening of 31 December 2019.

The two cooling towers were demolished early on the morning of 14 May 2020.

== Gallery ==
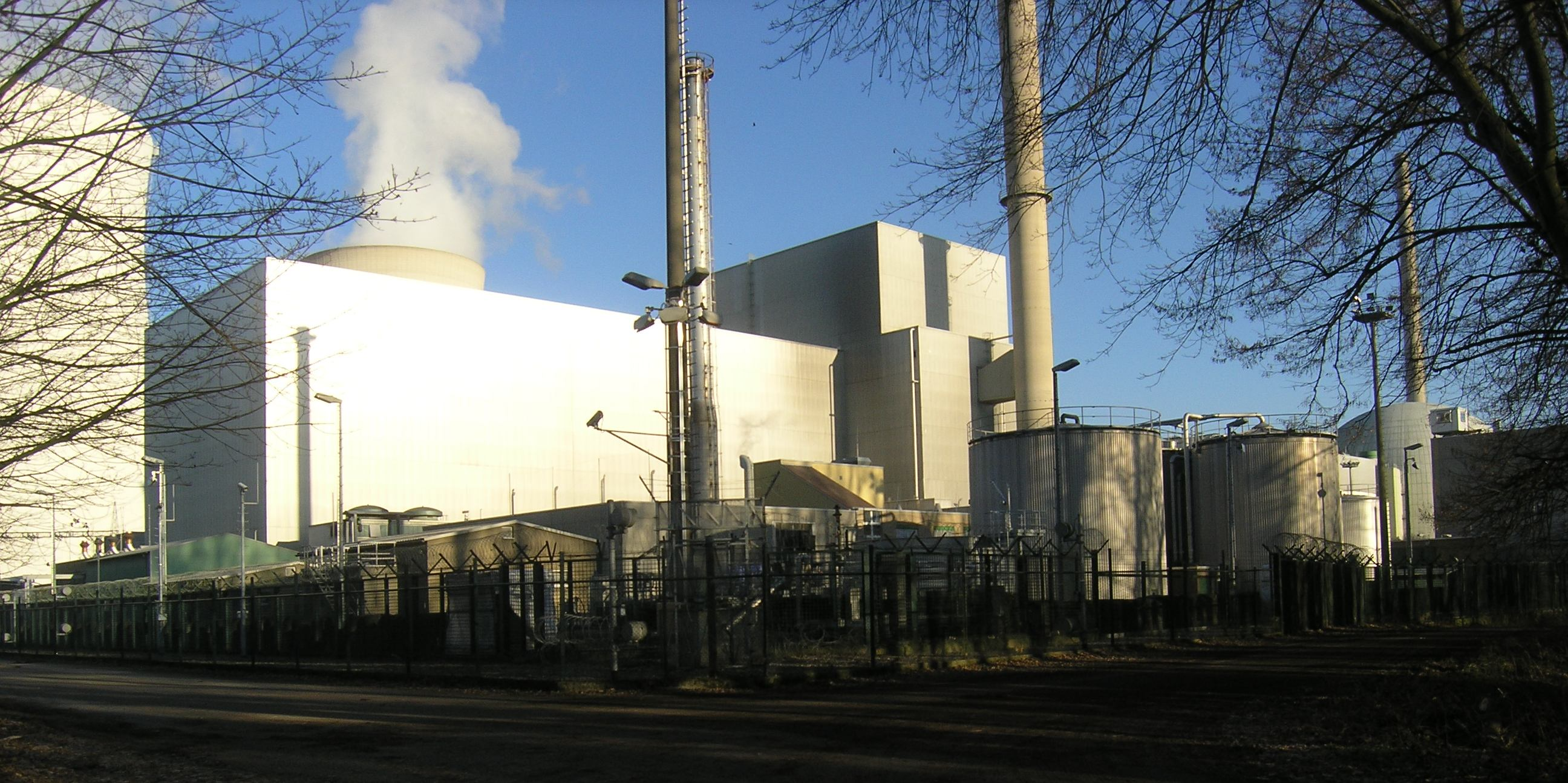
Unit 1

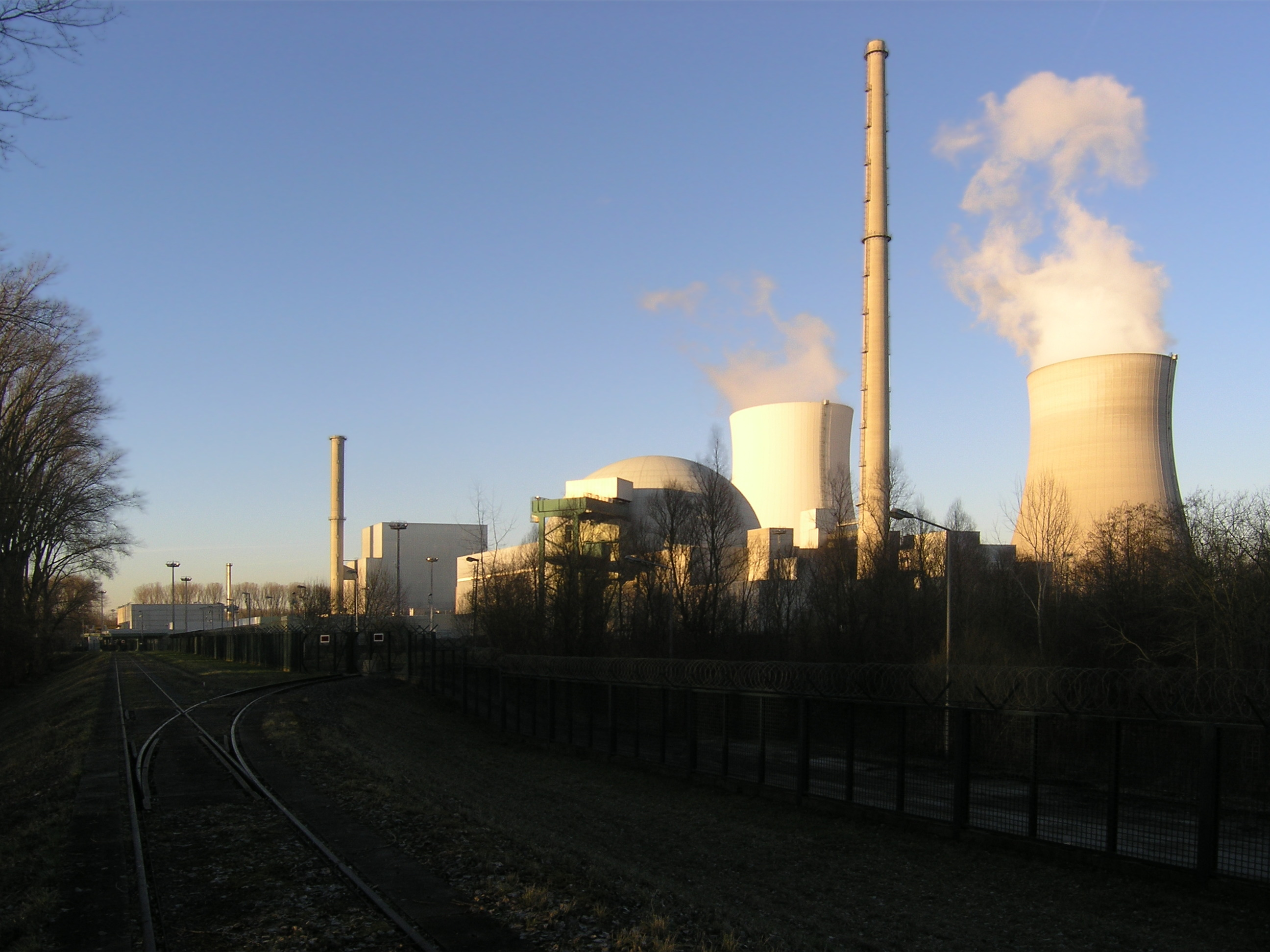
Unit 2

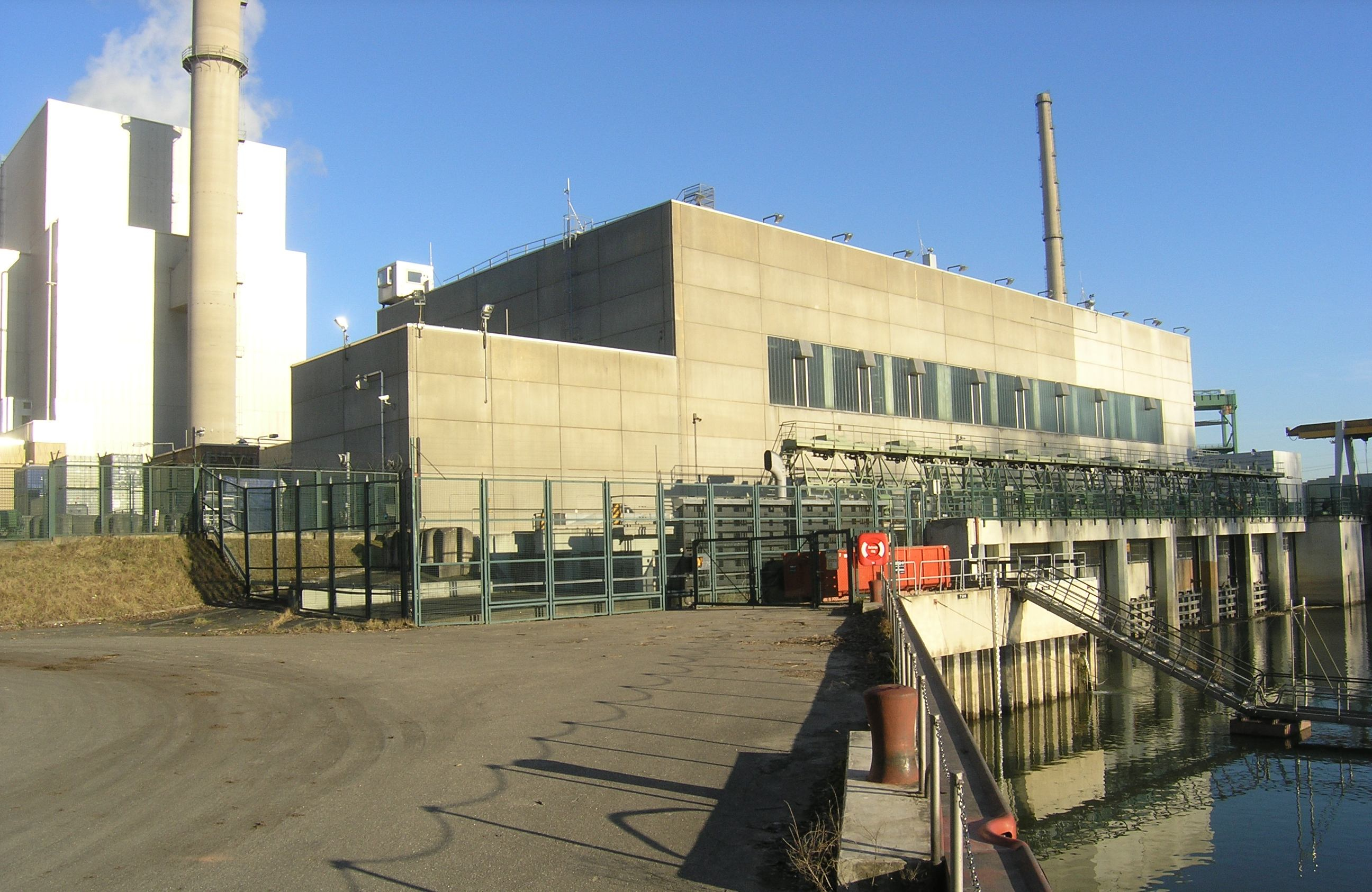
Coolant intake

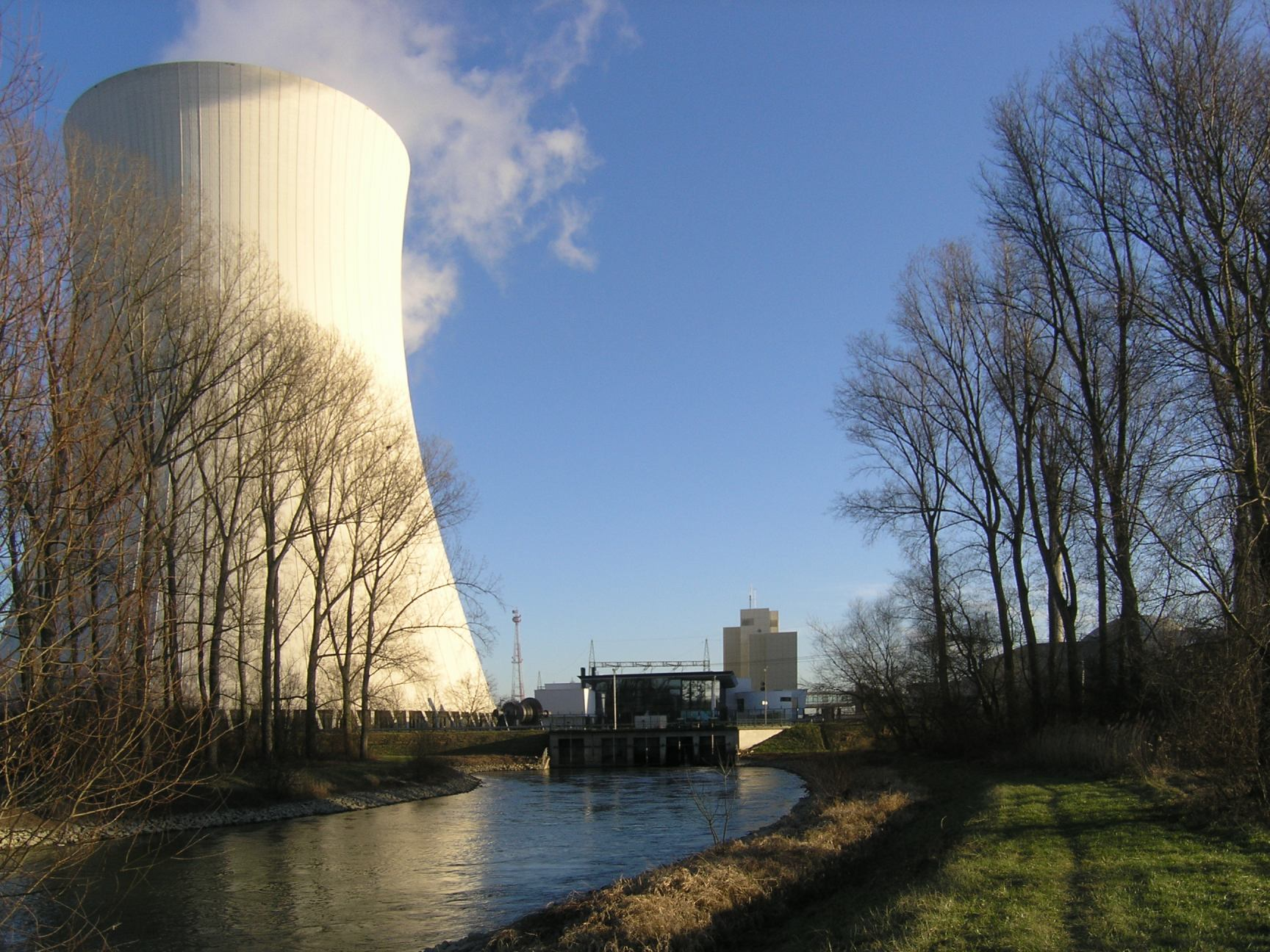
Cooling tower

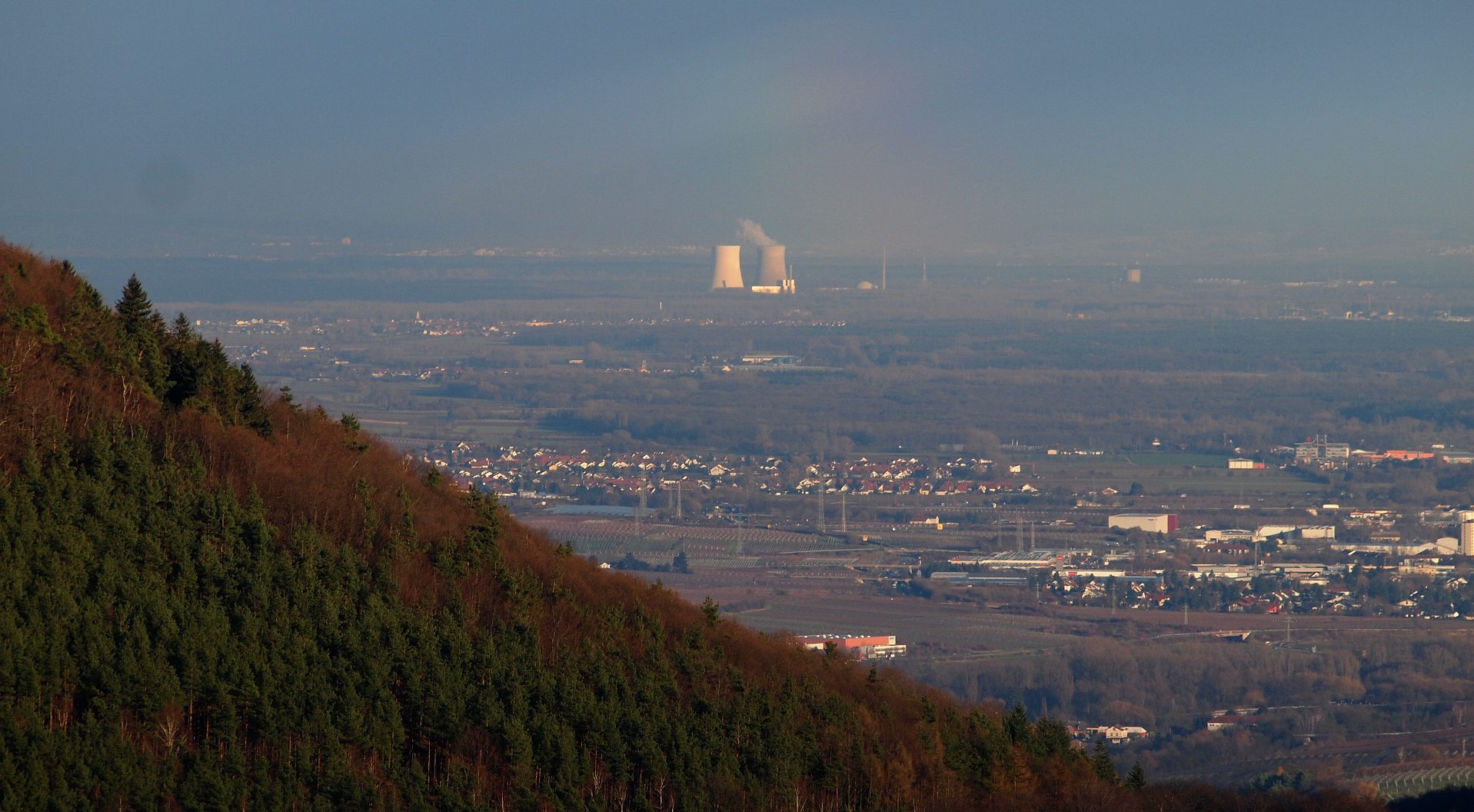
Remote view
