= Baltic 2 Offshore Wind Farm =

German offshore wind farm in the Baltic Sea

EnBW Baltic 2
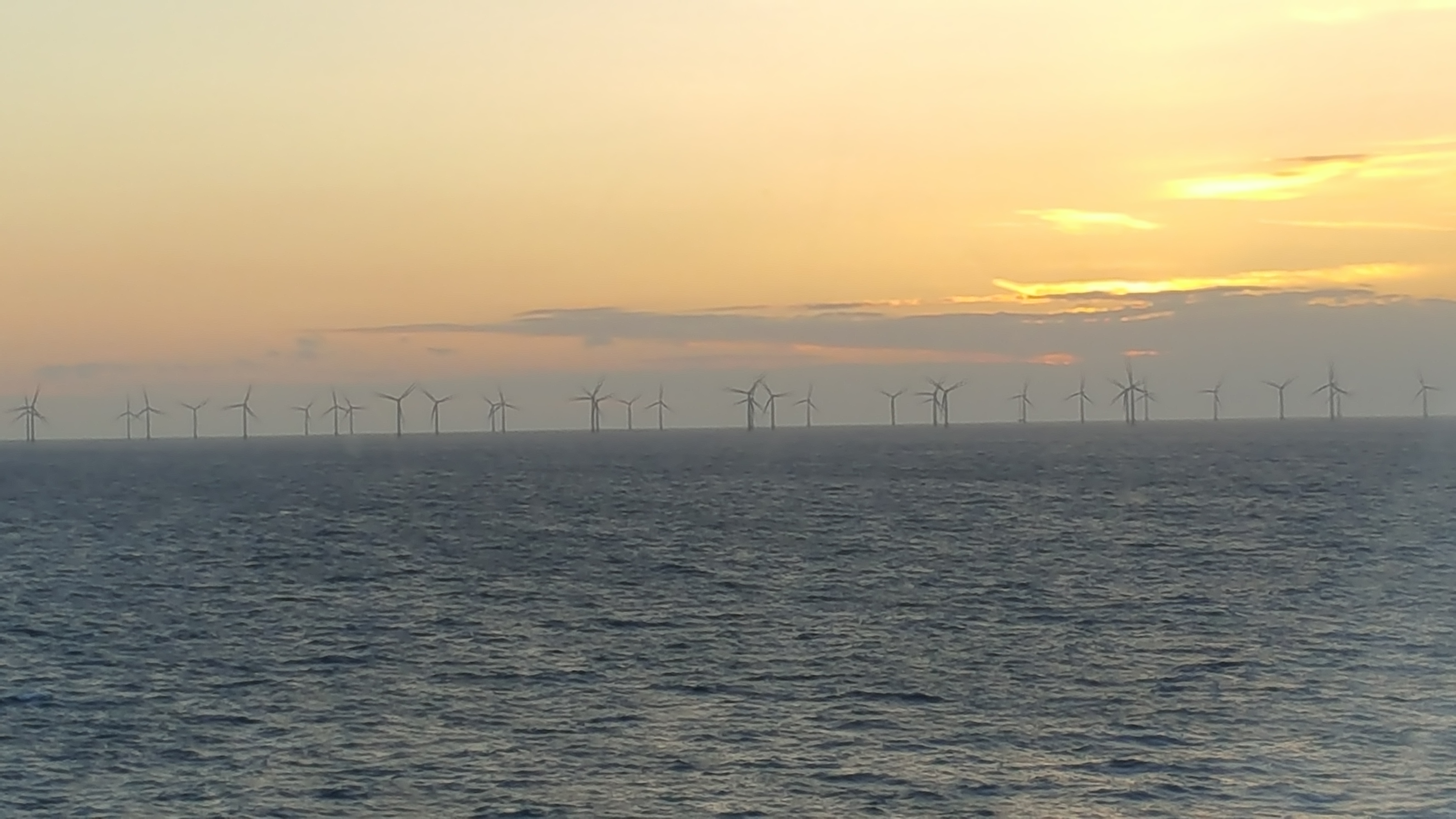
- Offshore-Windpark Baltic 2
- Country: Germany
- Location: Baltic Sea
- Coordinates: 54°58′24″N 13°10′40″E
- Status: Operational
- Commission date: 2015
- Owner: EnBW

Wind farm
- Type: Offshore
- Distance from shore: 32 km (20 mi)
- Rotor diameter: 120 m (390 ft)

Power generation
- Units operational: 80 × 3.6 MW
- Make and model: Siemens Gamesa SWT-3.6-120 (80)
- Nameplate capacity: 288 MW

External links
- Commons: Related media on Commons

Wind farm layout

EnBW Baltic 2 is an offshore wind farm in the German section of the Kriegers Flak reef in the Baltic Sea. The wind farm uses 80 Siemens SWT 3.6-120 wind turbines for a total capacity of 288 megawatt. Baltic 2 is connected to Germany via Baltic 1, but is also connected to Denmark via the adjacent offshore wind farm ″Kriegers Flak″ in 2020, creating a 400 MW AC offshore grid synchronized to the east Denmark network. The cable to Denmark costs €350m, of which €150m comes from the EU.

The €1,250 million Baltic 2 produced power in September 2015.

== See also ==
- Wind power in Germany
- List of offshore wind farms in Germany
- List of offshore wind farms
- List of offshore wind farms in the Baltic Sea
