= Hasel =

Hasel may refer to:

- Hasel, Germany, a town in the district of Lörrach in Baden-Württemberg in Germany
- Hasel (Mindel), a river of Bavaria, Germany, tributary of the Mindel
- Hasel (Werra), a river of Thuringia, Germany, tributary the Werra
- Hasel (Haune), a river of Hesse, Germany, tributary of the Haune
- Hasel (Orb), a river of Hesse, Germany, tributary of the Orb
- HASELL or HASEL, a mnemonic in aviation

== People with the surname ==
- Gerhard Hasel (1935–1994), Seventh-day Adventist theologian
- Joseph W. Hasel (1906–1996), American broadcaster
- Michael Hasel (born 1959), German flutist
- Michael G. Hasel, American Biblical archaeologist
