= Aerobatics =

Flying maneuvers involving attitudes not attained during normal flight

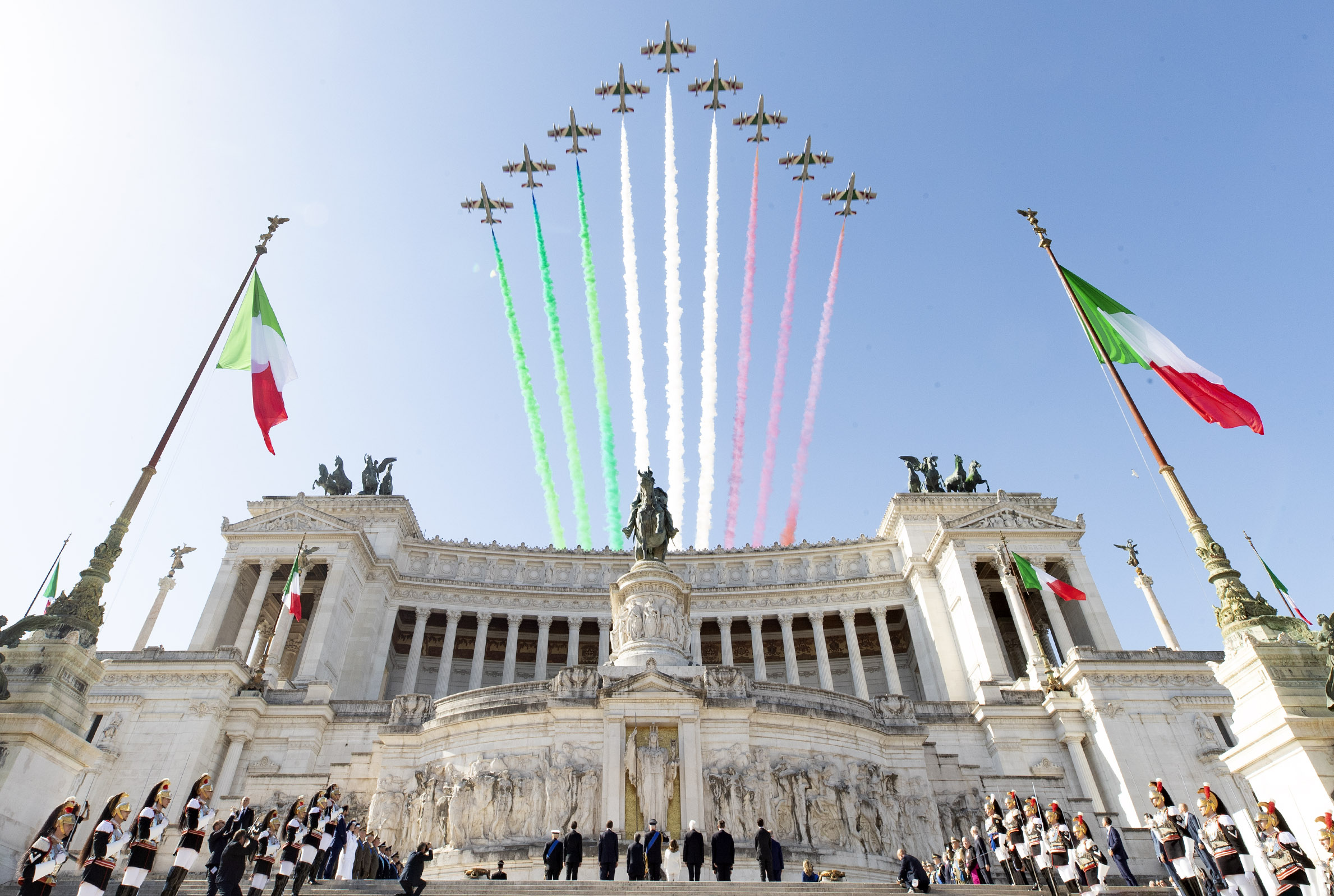
The Frecce Tricolori, the aerobatic demonstration team of the Italian Air Force, with the smoke trail representing the national colours of Italy, above the Victor Emmanuel II Monument in Rome during the celebrations of the Festa della Repubblica

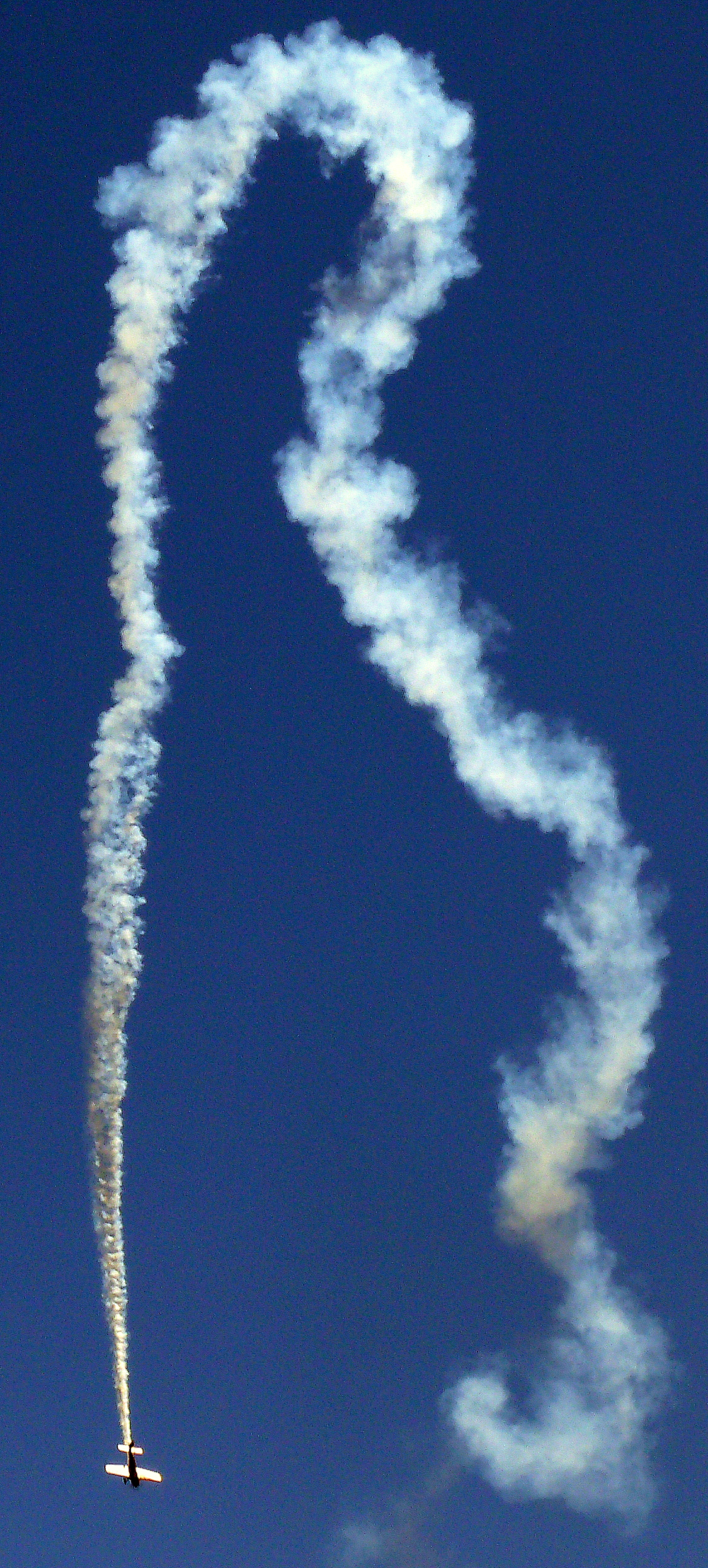
Patty Wagstaff show at JeffCo Airport in Denver, Colorado, June 2008

Aerobatics is the practice of flying maneuvers involving aircraft attitudes that are not used in conventional passenger-carrying flights, with the purpose of training, recreation, entertainment or sport. The term is a portmanteau of "aeroplane" and "acrobatics".

Most aerobatic maneuvers involve rotation of the aircraft about its longitudinal (roll) axis or lateral (pitch) axis. Other maneuvers, such as a spin, displace the aircraft about its vertical (yaw) axis. Manoeuvres are often combined to form a complete aerobatic sequence for entertainment or competition. Aerobatic flying requires a broader set of piloting skills and exposes the aircraft to greater structural stress than for normal flight. In some countries, the pilot must wear a parachute when performing aerobatics.

Aerobatic training enhances a pilot's ability to recover from unusual flight conditions, and thus is an element of many flight safety training programs for pilots. While many pilots fly aerobatics for recreation, some choose to fly in aerobatic competitions, a judged sport.

== Overview ==
In the early days of flying, some pilots used their aircraft as part of a flying circus to entertain. Maneuvers were flown for artistic reasons or to draw gasps from onlookers. In due course some of these maneuvers were found to allow aircraft to gain tactical advantage during aerial combat or dogfights between fighter aircraft.

Aerobatic aircraft fall into two categories—specialist aerobatic, and aerobatic capable. Specialist designs such as the Pitts Special, the Extra 200 and 300, and the Sukhoi Su-26M and Sukhoi Su-29 aim for ultimate aerobatic performance. This comes at the expense of general purpose use such as touring, or ease of non aerobatic handling such as landing. At a more basic level, aerobatic capable aircraft, such as the Cessna 152 Aerobat or the R2160 Acrobin, can be dual purpose—equipped to carrying passengers and luggage, as well as being capable of basic aerobatic figures.

Flight formation aerobatics are flown by teams of up to sixteen aircraft, although most teams fly between four and ten aircraft. Some are state funded to reflect pride in the armed forces, while others are commercially sponsored. Coloured smoke trails may be emitted to emphasise the patterns flown and/or the colours of a national flag.

Aerobatic maneuvers flown in a jet-powered aircraft are limited in scope as they cannot take advantage of the gyroscopic forces that a propeller driven aircraft can exploit. Jet-powered aircraft also tend to fly much faster, which increases the size of the figures and the length of time the pilot has to withstand increased g-forces. Jet aerobatic teams often fly in formations, which further restricts the maneuvers that can be safely flown.

A "Lazy eight" aerobatic maneuver from the perspective of the wingtip

Aerobatics done at low levels and for an audience is called "stunt flying". To enhance the show effect of aerobatic manoeuvres, smoke is sometimes generated; the smoke allows viewers to see the path travelled by the aircraft. Due to safety concerns, the smoke is not a result of combustion but is produced by the vaporization of fog oil into a fine aerosol, achieved either by injecting the oil into the hot engine exhaust or by the use of a dedicated device that can be fitted in any position on the aircraft. The first military aerobatic team to use smoke at will during displays was Fleet Air Arm 702 Squadron "The Black Cats" at the Farnborough Airshow in September 1957.

Aerobatics are typically performed in aeroplanes and gliders, but are not limited solely to fixed-wing aircraft, as they can also be performed in specific helicopters, such as the MBB Bo 105, Westland Lynx and Eurocopter EC120 Colibri. The British Army, Royal Navy, Spanish Air Force and the Indian Air Force have helicopter display teams.

=== Training ===
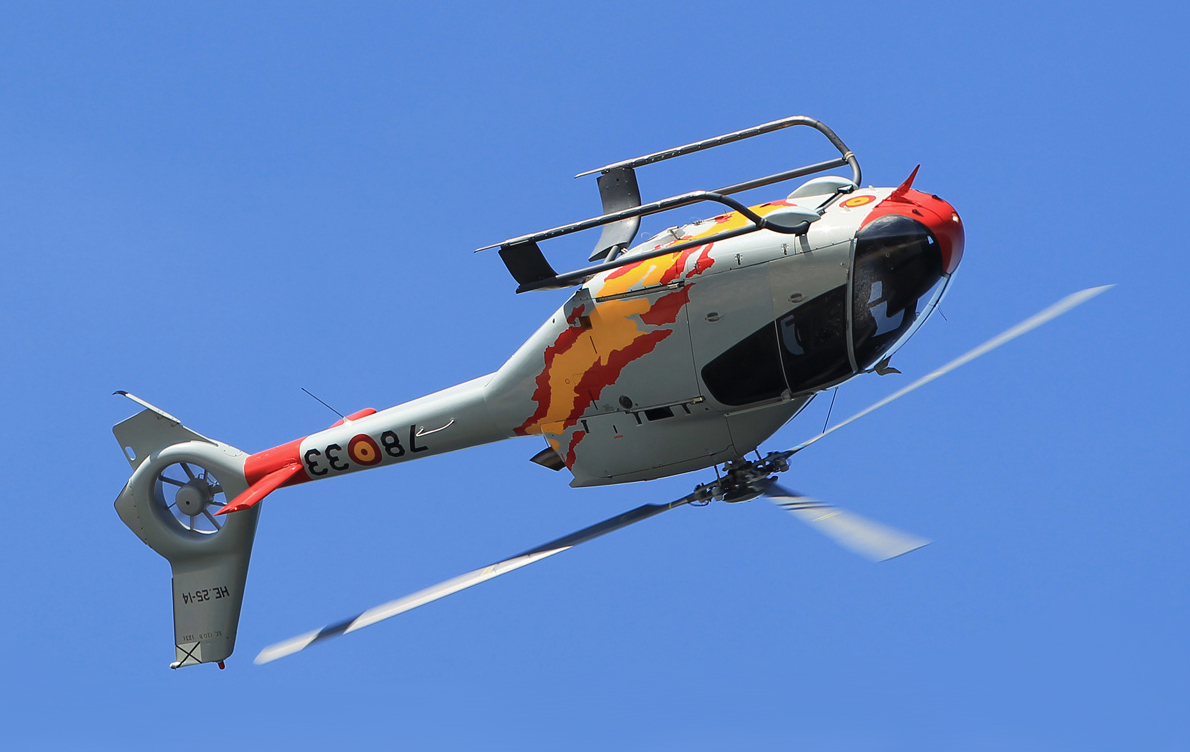
A Spanish Air Force Colibri demonstrates its agility with a barrel roll

Aerobatics are taught to military fighter pilots as a means of developing flying skills and for tactical use in combat. Many aerobatic manoeuvres were indeed developed in military conflicts, e.g. the Immelmann turn or Split S.

Aerobatics demands extensive training and practice to avoid accidents. Accidents due to aerobatic manoeuvres are very rare in competition aerobatics; most of them happen when performing formation flying or stunt flying at very low levels at airshows or air racing. Low-level aerobatics are extremely demanding and airshow pilots must demonstrate their ability before being allowed to gradually reduce the height at which they may fly their show.

In the European Union, aerobatics requires special training and a rating. In Canada, no licence is required to perform aerobatics, but to carry passengers during aerobatics a pilot must have at least 10 hours dual flight instruction of aerobatic manoeuvres, or 20 hours of total aerobatic experience.

=== Competition ===
Aerobatic flying competitions are a worldwide phenomenon, rather like the Olympic games, and are governed by the FAI Aerobatics Commission (CIVA).

Competitions start at Primary, or Graduate level (in UK "Beginners") and proceed in complexity through Sportsman (in UK "Standard"), Intermediate and Advanced, with Unlimited being the top competition level. Experienced aerobatic pilots have been measured to pull ±5 g for short periods while unlimited pilots can perform more extreme maneuvers and experience higher g levels -possibly up to +8/−6 g. The limits for positive g are higher than for negative g and this is due to the ability to limit blood pooling for positive g maneuvers, but it is generally accepted that +9 g for more than a few seconds will lead to loss of consciousness (also known as GLOC).

=== Performance ===
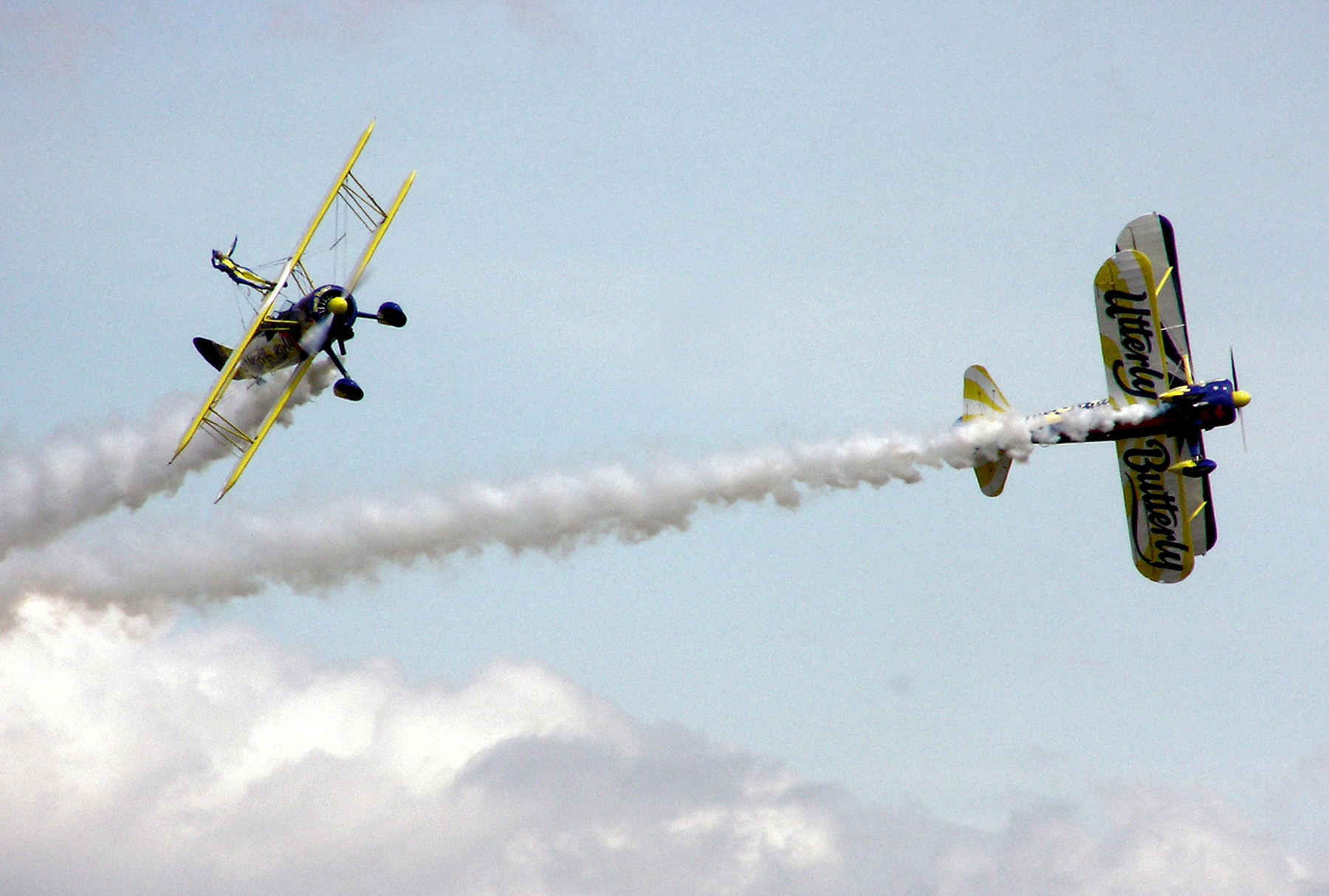
The Utterly Butterly wingwalking team perform an aerobatic maneuver with their Boeing Stearmans

Aerobatics are likely to be seen at public airshows in the form of stunt flying.

== In popular culture ==
=== Film ===
- Cloud Dancer – 1980 drama film starring David Carradine
- The Great Waldo Pepper – 1975 film starring Robert Redford, Bo Svenson, Susan Sarandon, and Edward Herrmann.

=== Video games ===
- Ace Combat – Flight action video game series
- AeroWings – 1999 video game
- Flight Unlimited – 1995 flight simulation video game
- Microsoft Flight Simulator 2024 – 2024 simulation video game
- X-Plane (simulator) – Flight simulator produced by Laminar Research
- VRChat Flight Communities
- War Thunder – 2013 free-to-play video game

== See also ==
- List of air display teams
- List of aerobatic aircraft
- Aero GP
- Aerobatic maneuver
- Aerobatic pilots
- Aerobatics (radio-controlled aircraft)
- Air racing
- Aresti Catalog
- Competition aerobatics
- Flight dynamics
- Flypast
- HASELL
