= Kriegers Flak =

- Submerged bank
- Kriegers Flak (Baltic Sea)
- Coordinates: 55°2′N 13°2′E
- Sea: Baltic Sea
- Area: East of Møn
- Country: Denmark, Germany and Sweden
- Minimum depth: 17 m

Kriegers Flak is a reef located in the Baltic Sea, north of Rügen, south of Skåne with its west most point about 15 km east of Møn. It is named after the Danish naval officer Christian Krieger, who in 1840 mapped the Baltic Sea. The Danish part of the reef has at its most shallow place a depth of 16 m.

The reef spans the exclusive economic zones of Denmark, Germany and Sweden and is estimated to be able to accommodate 1600 MW worth of offshore wind farms of these three countries. As such, it is the site of the German 288 MW offshore wind farm Baltic 2, and of the Danish 600 MW offshore wind farm Kriegers Flak. A 640 MW Swedish wind farm proposed by Vattenfall received preliminary approval by Sweden in May 2022.

== See also ==
- Kriegers Flak (wind farm)
- Adlergrund
