= Radio-controlled aerobatics =

Practice of flying radio-controlled aircraft

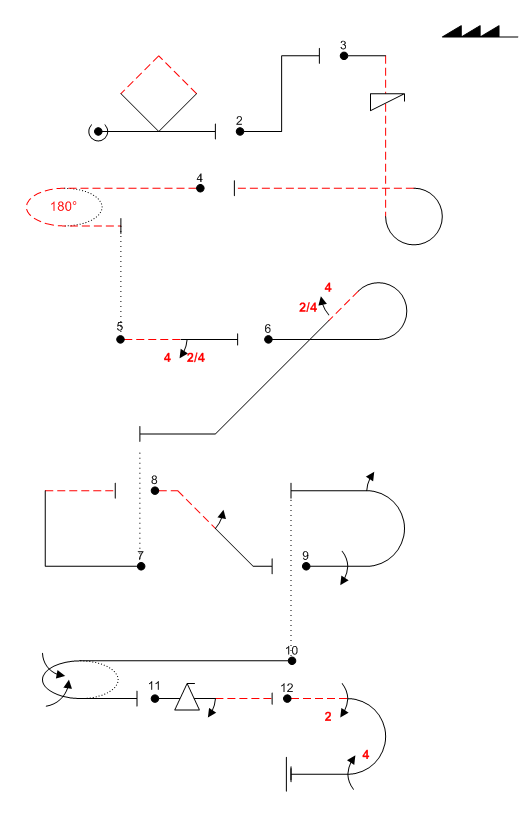
Complex aerobatic sequence in Aresti notation.

Radio-controlled aerobatics is the practice of flying radio-controlled aircraft in maneuvers involving aircraft attitudes that are not used in normal flight.

== Beginner RC maneuvers ==
The "inside loop".

The "outside loop."

=== Inside loops ===
Due to its simplicity, the inside loop is among the first aerobatic maneuvers a pilot learns. It is named after a 360 degree circle with the pilot on the inside of the loop. Simply applying power while pulling back on the elevator stick will cause the aircraft to loop upward into vertical flight, continue into inverted flight, continue into a dive, and return to horizontal flight. A well-performed inside loop will look like clean circle with the same entry and exit point, and this requires management of power to overcome the tendency of gravity to shorten the upward portion and lengthen the downward portion.

The inside loop is performed by:

- starting from level controlled flight
- increasing power to maximum and applying up elevator in the amount that yields desired loop curvature
- reducing the up elevator input to maintain loop curvature at the 2nd and 3rd quadrant
- reducing power at the 4th quadrant while adjusting elevator input to maintain curvature
- pulling back to level flight and increasing power while returning elevator to neutral

=== Outside loops ===
An outside loop follows the same path as an inside loop, but is performed with the pilot or cockpit on the outside of the circle the aircraft describes.

Therefore, if the aircraft starts in a normal, upright flight position, then an outside loop will be performed by inputting down elevator and progressing down below the original line of flight before executing a circular path to return to the original position. This is sometimes referred to as a 'bunt'.

Outside loops generally require more power and a higher control input than inside loops to perform because the lift force is in an outwards direction, thus tending to pull the aircraft out of the loop.

=== Immelmann turn ===
Side view of the Immelmann turn: (1) Level flight; (2) Half loop; (3) 180° roll to bring aircraft back level flight.

The Immelmann turn is named after flying ace Max Immelmann. It has become one of the most popular aerial maneuvers, being commonly used in airshows all across the globe.

To execute the Immelmann turn, the pilot pulls the aircraft into a vertical climb, and eventually completes half a loop in the aircraft from this climb, inverting the aircraft. The pilot then executes a half-roll to regain level flight.

The Immelmann turn can also be reversed by starting with a half-roll into inverted flight, and then using elevator to pull the aircraft down through a half loop back to level flight.

In both cases, the aircraft has changed course 180 degrees and exchanges speed with altitude.

=== Inverted flight ===
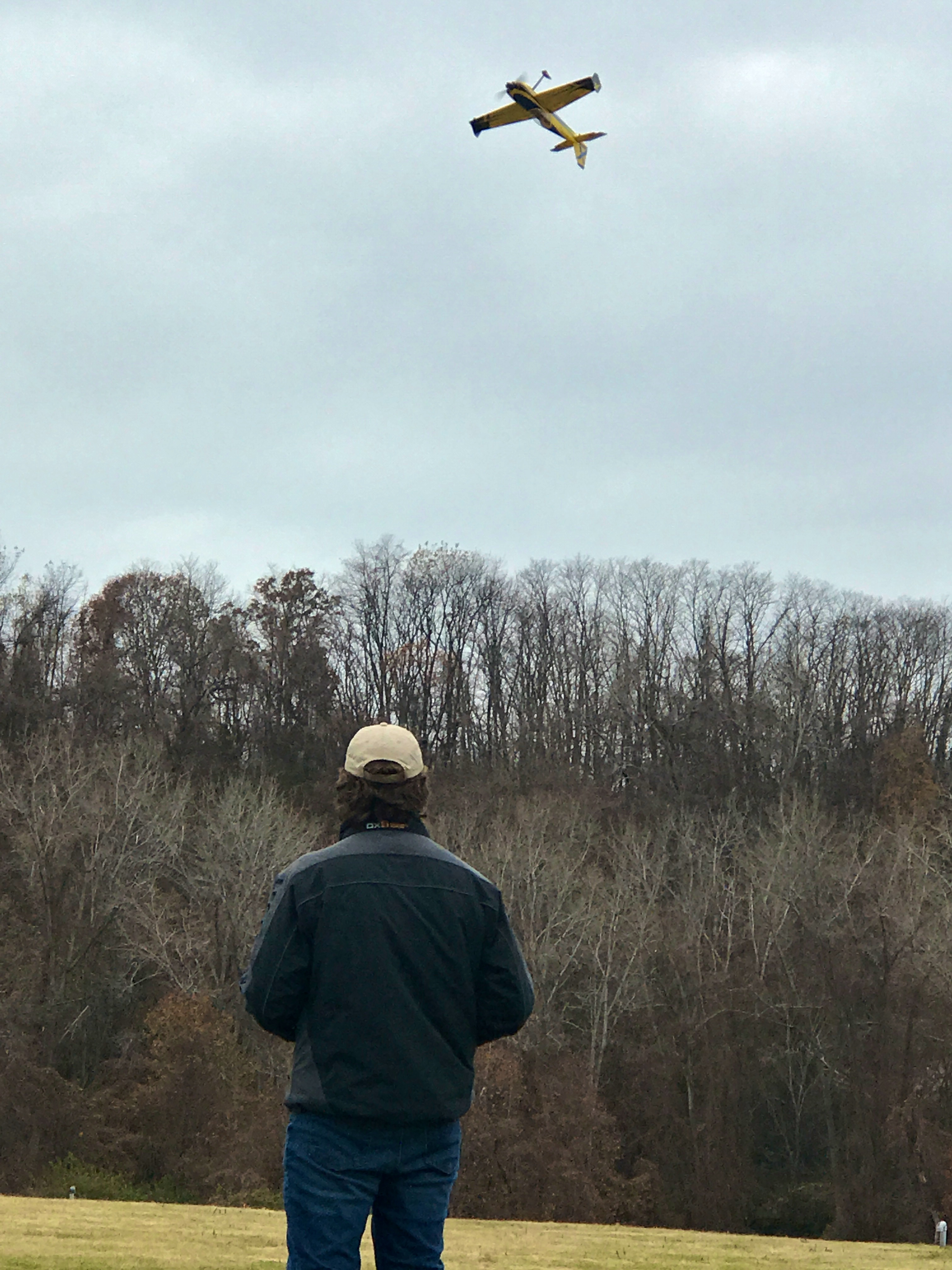
Hobbyist demonstrating inverted flight with an Extreme Flight 74" Slick

An aircraft is in inverted flight when it has rotated 180 degrees about its longitudinal axis, so that its cockpit and tail fin are pointing at the ground.

Inverted flight in itself is not generally regarded as a maneuver, rather as an attitude in which to perform other aerobatic maneuvers. Therefore, an inverted maneuver is one in which the aircraft begins in an inverted flight position.

There are many ways to enter inverted flight. The simplest is to

- begin from straight level flight,
- increase power if necessary, depending on the aircraft,
- roll the aircraft with aileron control while maintaining heading with slight rudder and/or elevator input, neutralizing aileron when inverted,
- apply slight down elevator to maintain level inverted flight.

When in inverted flight, elevator and rudder inputs are reversed while aileron and throttle input remains the same.

Alternatively, one can enter inverted flight by performing half an inside loop or half an outside loop.

== Intermediate RC maneuvers ==
The intermediate maneuvers, not suitable for beginners, require skills acquired by considerable practice, and often include the use of stalls. Trainer aircraft are not suitable for these.

=== Stall turn ===
The stall turn, also known as a Hammerhead.

In a stall turn the plane goes upward, decelerates, yaws 180° under stall, and comes down nearly the same path it goes up, as if it gets hammered on the head.

To perform a stall turn;

1. From level flight input up elevator and reduce power until the aircraft stalls. The angle, speed, and abruptness at which stall occurs depends on the aircraft.
2. As the aircraft stalls input full rudder to one side. This will swiftly swing the aircraft through 180 degrees, gyrating in yaw about the inside wing tip with gravity-induced angular momentum.
3. Release the rudder input before the yaw completes 180 degrees to prevent yaw overshoot
4. On the downward heading gently input up elevator until the aircraft recovers into level flight.

=== Slow roll ===
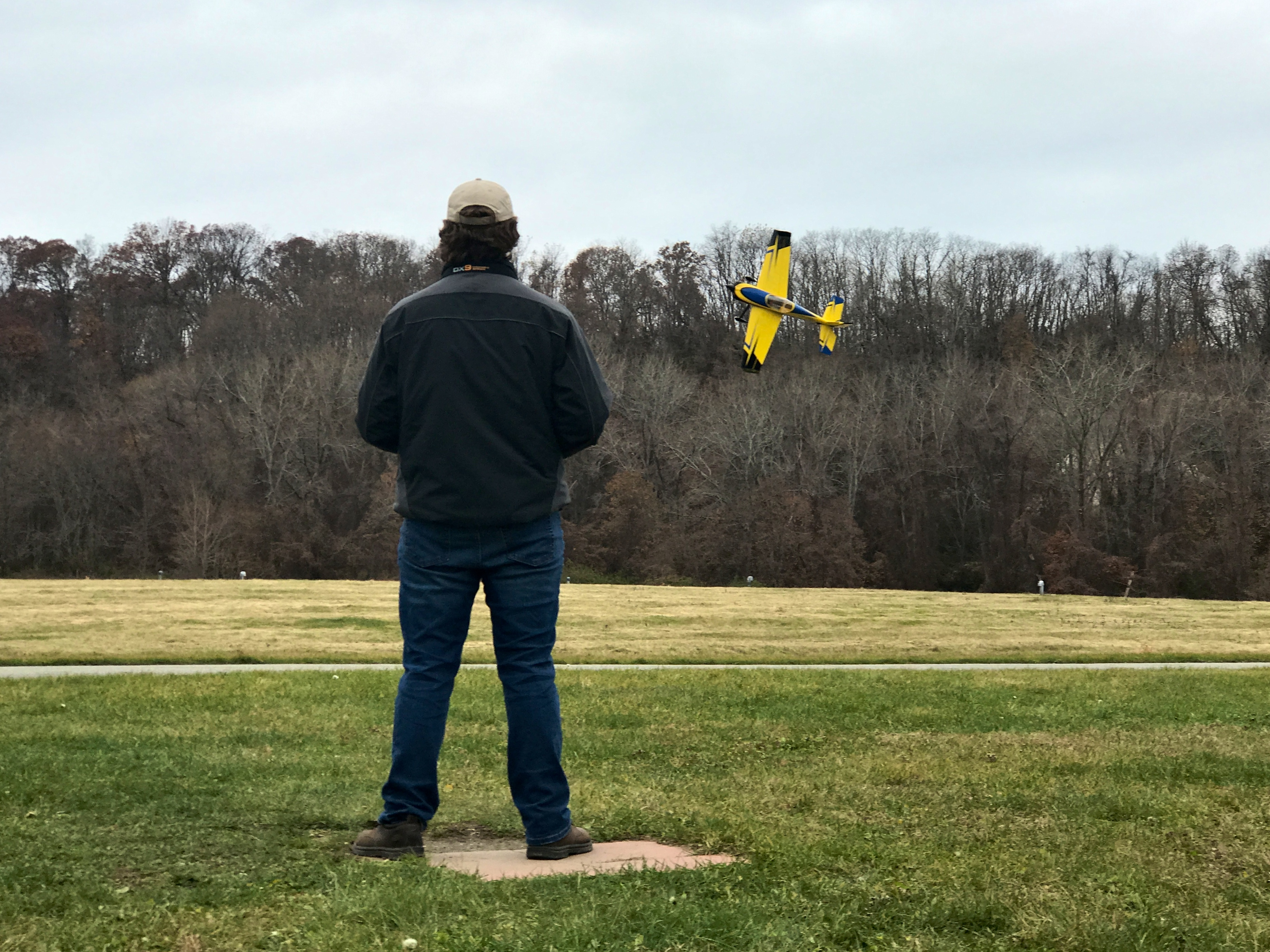
Hobbyist demonstrating knife edge flying

The slow roll is just what the name implies. It is accomplished by inputting either right or left aileron. However, unlike most axial rolls, the slow roll is performed using less than full deflection in the ailerons. The result is a graceful maneuver, but because the aircraft is knife-edge or inverted for a long duration of time, rudder and elevator have to be used to maintain a straight flight path.

When the left wing is down, right rudder is needed to hold level flight. Rolling slowly left will require moving the rudder slowly to the right, then back to center as the wings become level in inverted flight (where of course some elevator is needed), and then to the left as the roll continues and puts the right wing down, and finally back to center and the aircraft returns to straight and level flight.

A slow roll performed on a straight line like an imaginary taut string is a difficult maneuver. Its accomplishment may prepare the student for more advanced maneuvers.

=== Four-point roll ===
The four-point roll is a quick series of quarter rolls. The pilot gives four separate, but very brief aileron inputs. The first rolls the aircraft to knife-edge, the second rolls the aircraft inverted, the third rolls the aircraft to opposite knife-edge, and the final input rolls the aircraft back to upright.

=== Snap rolls ===
The snap roll is an aggressive roll. The aircraft rotates about all axes at the same time, the predominant rotation being about the longitudinal axis. This sometimes violent maneuver is accomplished one of two ways. A positive, or inside, snap is executed by going hard over on all controls: full aileron, full rudder, and full up elevator. A negative, or outside, snap, is executed differently: full aileron, full opposite rudder, full down elevator.

=== Cuban-8 ===
The Cuban 8 is a combination move involving both regular and inverted flight. The figure 8 maneuver is started from straight and level flight, and then pulling up and over into inverted flight. Rolling 180 degrees puts the airframe back to normal orientation to cross over in the middle of the eight and then pull back up into inverted flight again. Rolling out the second time and descending back to cross the 8 again completes the maneuver.

You could say the Cuban-8 maneuver is like a figure 8 on a vertical plane that consists of two Immelmann turns.

Aresti Symbol
Cuban Eight
Half Cuban Eight
Reverse Half Cuban Eight

== Advanced RC maneuvers ==
=== Rolling circle ===
Control stick inputs for the rolling circle (left-turning right-rolling), showing the typical amount of elevator and rudder input as a function of rolling position.

Rolling circle is a maneuver in which an aircraft rolls continuously while turning in a circle. This is arguably one of the most difficult maneuvers to perfect, since varying pitch and yaw corrections are necessary to keep the heading level while maintaining constant roll rate and turning radius.

The standard rolling circle involves 1 roll at each quadrant of the turn, resulting in a total of 4 rolls throughout the 360° horizontal turn. The most logical method to approach the rolling circle is to think of it as 4 slow rolls with turn. The procedure below describes a left-turning right-rolling quadrant:

1. Flying straight and level at normal speed, feed right aileron that results in a constant roll rate that would complete a roll in the time required for a 90° horizontal turn. Simultaneously, feed left rudder and down elevator that would result in a desired turning radius while maintaining level.
2. As the aircraft rolls from 0° to 360°, input both rudder and elevator sequentially as in slow roll, except with some phase lead for rudder and elevator. The shifted timing for elevator and rudder inputs causes the aircraft to turn while maintaining attitude throughout the roll.
3. Once the aircraft completes 360° of roll at ¼ turn, repeat step 2. three more times to complete the entire rolling circle. Neutralize aileron, elevator, and rudder gradually as the rolling circle completes.

Below is a graph that illustrates the elevator and rudder input as a function of rolling position during one turn quadrant. For this case, 60° rudder phase lead and 90° elevator phase lead are used. Actual amplitude and phase leads may vary depending on aircraft behavior.

=== Lomcevak ===
The Lomcevak maneuver is when the aircraft's tail spins pitching down about its wing while the entire aircraft is continuously stalled.

There are several methods to execute this maneuver. The most common method is as follows:

1. Flying full throttle from right to left, pull up to a 45-degree upline.
2. Roll the wing to the left 90 degrees so the left wing tip points to the ground.
3. Feed full right rudder, full right aileron, and full down elevator.
4. The aircraft should exhibit the Lomcevak while spiraling downwards.
5. Before reaching terra-firma, exit the maneuver by neutralizing rudder, aileron, and pitch input, then roll toward exit heading, and pull out into level flight.

Alternatively, one can enter Lomcevak as follows:

1. Pull up vertically and minimize throttle.
2. Feed left rudder as if to execute a stall turn.
3. As the plane begins to stall, feed full right rudder, full right aileron, full down elevator, and full throttle.
4. The aircraft should exhibit the Lomcevak while spiraling downwards.
5. Exit the maneuver as the above method.

This maneuver calls for a specific type of aircraft. Since the motion involves rapid downward pitch, a low-wing aircraft with high thrustline is desirable, as it naturally creates the downward pitch moment. Also, the aircraft should readily snap on command. Cap 232 is by far the easiest design by which to execute Lomcevak.

Lomecevak video
