= Offshore wind farm He Dreiht =

Offshore wind farm in the German North Sea

He Dreiht Offshore Wind Farm
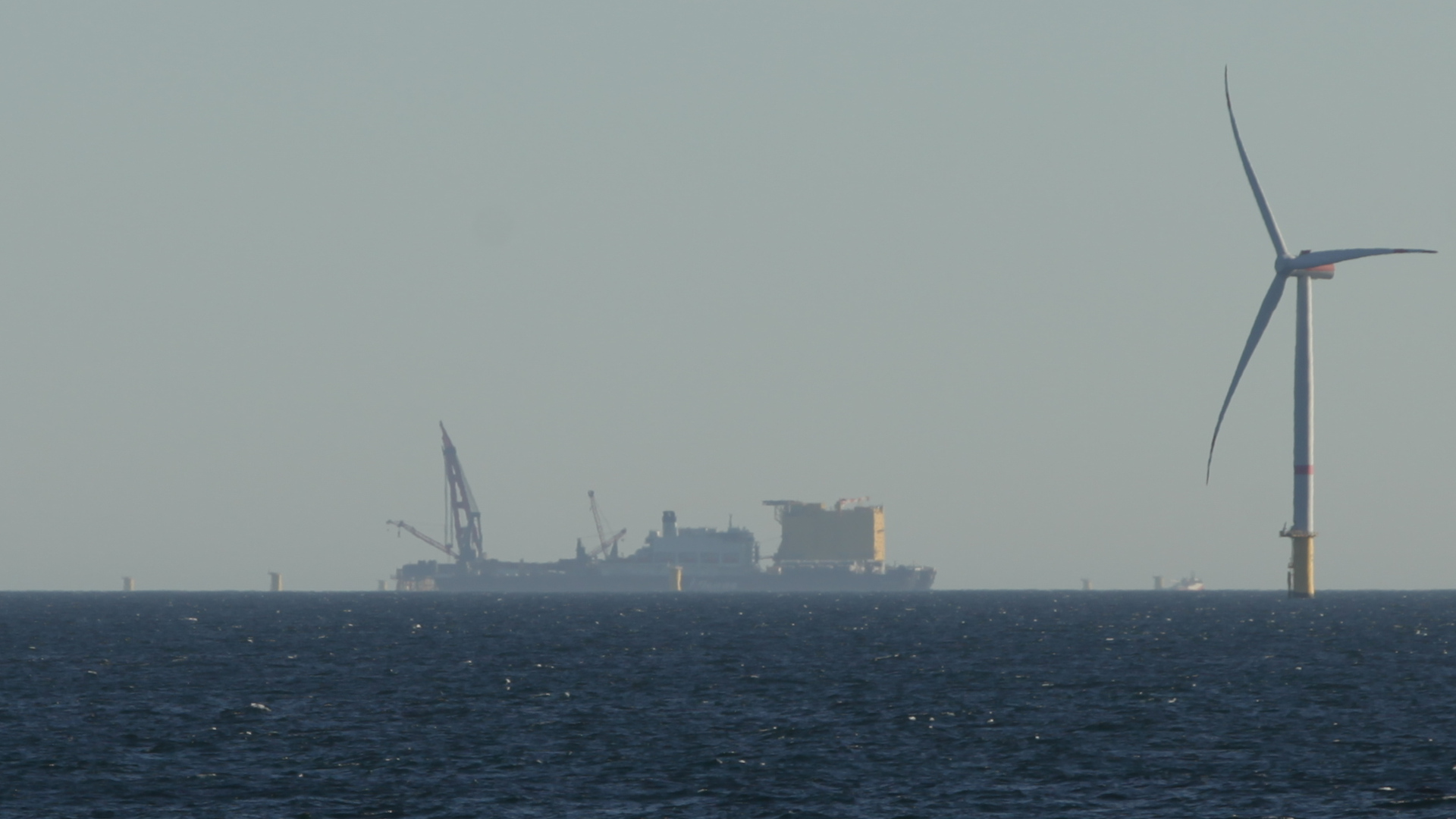
- Country: Germany
- Coordinates: 54°21′N 6°12′E
- Owner: EnBW

Wind farm
- Type: Offshore
- Rotor diameter: 115.5 m (379 ft)

Power generation
- Units planned: 64 × 15 MW
- Nameplate capacity: 960 MW

External links
- Website: www.enbw.com/company/topics/wind-power/offshore-wind-farm-he-dreiht/

Wind farm layout

The He Dreiht offshore wind farm is a wind farm in the German exclusive economic zone of the North Sea, approximately 85 km north of the island of Borkum and approximately 104 km west of the island of Heligoland.The installed capacity is 960 MW.

EnBW secured a contract for 900 MW for He Dreiht in April 2017. In the tender under the Offshore Wind Energy Act, EnBW offered 0.00 cents per kilowatt hour, thus securing grid connection capacity without entitlement to a market premium under the Renewable Energy Sources Act.

On March 23, 2023, the investment decision for 64 turbines with a total capacity of 960 MW was made.

At the same time, EnBW sold a 49.9% stake in the wind farm to a consortium consisting of the Norwegian sovereign wealth fund, Norges Bank Investment Management, the Danish infrastructure investment platform AIP Management, and the German private equity arm Allianz Capital Partners. As of July 2025, EnBW still has 50.1% and AIP, Allianz and Norges Bank each have one third of 49,9 %.

EnBW has also secured long-term financing of 600 million Euro from the European Investment Bank.

Following an EU-wide tender, EnBW awarded the contract to supply the offshore wind turbines to Vestas Wind Systems. The turbine type is the V236-15.0MW, with a capacity of 15 megawatts and a rotor diameter of 236 meters.

Heerema Marine Contractors was awarded the contract for the installation of the foundations.

The 64 monopiles were manufactured by Steelwind Nordenham, and the transition pieces were the result of a collaboration between Smulders and Sif.

== See also ==
- Wind power in Germany
