= HASELL =

In aviation, in Australia, Canada, New Zealand, South Africa, the United Kingdom and elsewhere, HASELL or alternatively HASEL, is a standard mnemonic to prompt a series of checks prior to carrying out many types of manoeuvres, such as stalls, spins, spiral dives or aerobatics.

The HASEL acronym stands for:

- Height
- Area
- Security
- Engine
- Lookout

or alternatively:

- Height
- Airframe
- Security
- Engine
- Location
- Lookout

HASELL is often abbreviated to HELL for any subsequent manoeuvres.

The Area or Location check can be broken down into the following checks with the mnemonic ABCCD:

- Active airfields
- Built up areas
- Cloud
- Controlled airspace
- Danger areas
