= 2015 Red Bull Air Race of Las Vegas =

The 2015 Red Bull Air Race of Las Vegas was the eighth round of the 2015 Red Bull Air Race World Championship season, the tenth season of the Red Bull Air Race World Championship. The event was held at the Las Vegas Motor Speedway, on the outskirts of Las Vegas, Nevada.

== Master Class ==
=== Qualification ===
Pos	No.	Pilot	Run Time	Pen
1	31	(Japan) Yoshihide Muroya	48.618	
2	95	(Australia) Matt Hall	48.853	
3	55	(United Kingdom) Paul Bonhomme	48.956	
4	27	(France) Nicolas Ivanoff	49.246	
5	21	(Germany) Matthias Dolderer	49.299	
6	22	(Austria) Hannes Arch	49.411	
7	10	(United States) Kirby Chambliss	49.627	
8	8	(Czech Republic) Martin Šonka	50.361	
9	99	(United States) Michael Goulian	50.504	
10	26	(Spain) Juan Velarde	50.775	
11	84	(Canada) Pete McLeod	50.800	+1sec
12	12	(France) François Le Vot	51.764	
13	91	(Hungary) Péter Besenyei	53.719	+4sec
14	9	(United Kingdom) Nigel Lamb	DNS	

=== Round of 14 ===
Heat	Pilot One	Time One	Time Two	Pilot Two
1	(Germany) Matthias Dolderer (5)	48.325	49.859	(Spain) Juan Velarde (10)
2	(France) Nicolas Ivanoff (4)	49.748	51.771^{1}	(Canada) Pete McLeod (11)
3	(Austria) Hannes Arch (6)	49.658	49.851	(United States) Michael Goulian (9)
4	(United Kingdom) Paul Bonhomme (3)	48.341	55.330^{3}	(France) François Le Vot (12)
5	(United States) Kirby Chambliss (7)	52.811^{1}	51.107^{1}	(Czech Republic) Martin Šonka (8)
6	(Australia) Matt Hall (2)	52.284^{2}	54.084^{2}	(Hungary) Péter Besenyei (13)
7	(Japan) Yoshihide Muroya (1)	49.112	50.138	(United Kingdom) Nigel Lamb (14)

Key
Qualified for next round
Knocked out
Fastest loser, qualified

- ^1 Pilot received 2 seconds in penalties.
- ^2 Pilot received 3 seconds in penalties.
- ^3 Pilot received 5 seconds in penalties.

=== Round of 8 ===
Heat	Pilot One	Time One	Time Two	Pilot Two
1	(France) Nicolas Ivanoff (4)	51.095^{1}	50.346^{1}	(Germany) Matthias Dolderer (5)
2	(United Kingdom) Paul Bonhomme (3)	49.175	49.308	(Austria) Hannes Arch (6)
3	(Australia) Matt Hall (2)	49.955	53.163^{2}	(Czech Republic) Martin Šonka (8)
4	(Japan) Yoshihide Muroya (1)	48.817	50.211	(United States) Michael Goulian (9)

Key
Qualified for next round
Knocked out

- ^1 Pilot received 2 seconds in penalties.
- ^2 Pilot received 5 seconds in penalties.

=== Final 4 ===
Pos	No.	Pilot	Run Time	Pen
1	95	(Australia) Matt Hall	48.604	
2	55	(United Kingdom) Paul Bonhomme	48.968	
3	21	(Germany) Matthias Dolderer	49.358	
4	31	(Japan) Yoshihide Muroya	49.415	

== Challenger Class ==
=== Results ===
Pos	No.	Pilot	Run Time	Pen
1	11	(France) Mikaël Brageot	1:00.521	
2	37	(Slovenia) Peter Podlunšek	1:00.556	
3	5	(Chile) Cristian Bolton	1:00.920	
4	18	(Czech Republic) Petr Kopfstein	1:02.117	
5	62	(Germany) Florian Berger	1:02.255	
6	17	(Sweden) Daniel Ryfa	1:02.459	

== Standings after the event ==
Master Class standings

Pos	Pilot	Pts
1	(United Kingdom) Paul Bonhomme	76
2	(Australia) Matt Hall	71
3	(Austria) Hannes Arch	34
4	(Czech Republic) Martin Šonka	29
5	(Germany) Matthias Dolderer	26

Challenger Class standings

Pos	Pilot	Pts
1	(France) Mikaël Brageot	28
1	(Czech Republic) Petr Kopfstein	28
1	(Sweden) Daniel Ryfa	28
4	(Chile) Cristian Bolton	24
5	(Slovenia) Peter Podlunšek	18

- Note: Only the top five positions are included for both sets of standings.
- Note: The Challenger Class event in Las Vegas was a 'winner take all' finale – Mikaël Brageot won the event and the title despite being equal on points with Petr Kopfstein and Daniel Ryfa.

Previous race: 2015 Red Bull Air Race of Fort Worth	Red Bull Air Race; 2015 season	Next race: 2016 Red Bull Air Race of Abu Dhabi
Previous race: 2014 Red Bull Air Race of Las Vegas	Red Bull Air Race of Las Vegas	Next race: 2016 Red Bull Air Race of Las Vegas
