= 2015 Red Bull Air Race of Ascot =

The 2015 Red Bull Air Race of Ascot was the fifth round of the 2015 Red Bull Air Race World Championship season, the tenth season of the Red Bull Air Race World Championship. The event was held at the Ascot Racecourse in the United Kingdom.

Championship leader Paul Bonhomme took his third victory of the 2015 season, as he was the only pilot of the four finalists to set a time without recording any penalties. He finished 2.6 seconds clear of Matt Hall, with Yoshihide Muroya completing the podium. In the Challenger class, Petr Kopfstein took his second win, 1.144 seconds ahead of Cristian Bolton. Daniel Ryfa had finished quickest, but was given a two-second penalty, and therefore dropped to third.

== Master Class ==
=== Qualification ===
Pos	No.	Pilot	Run Time	Pen
1	55	(United Kingdom) Paul Bonhomme	1:06.023	
2	95	(Australia) Matt Hall	1:06.284	
3	8	(Czech Republic) Martin Šonka	1:07.172	
4	91	(Hungary) Péter Besenyei	1:07.443	
5	31	(Japan) Yoshihide Muroya	1:07.864	
6	27	(France) Nicolas Ivanoff	1:08.075	
7	10	(United States) Kirby Chambliss	1:08.136	
8	9	(United Kingdom) Nigel Lamb	1:08.220	
9	99	(United States) Michael Goulian	1:08.438	
10	21	(Germany) Matthias Dolderer	1:08.439	+2sec
11	12	(France) François Le Vot	1:09.280	
12	26	(Spain) Juan Velarde	1:09.996	
13	84	(Canada) Pete McLeod	1:10.631	+2sec
14	22	(Austria) Hannes Arch	DNF	

=== Round of 14 ===
Heat	Pilot One	Time One	Time Two	Pilot Two
1	(Japan) Yoshihide Muroya (5)	1:07.623	1:08.844	(Germany) Matthias Dolderer (10)
2	(Hungary) Péter Besenyei (4)	1:08.919	1:13.511^{2}	(France) François Le Vot (11)
3	(France) Nicolas Ivanoff (6)	1:07.967	1:08.721	(United States) Michael Goulian (9)
4	(Czech Republic) Martin Šonka (3)	1:07.405	1:09.003	(Spain) Juan Velarde
5	(United States) Kirby Chambliss (7)	1:10.590^{1}	1:10.047^{1}	(United Kingdom) Nigel Lamb (8)
6	(Australia) Matt Hall (2)	1:06.833	1:11.019^{2}	(Canada) Pete McLeod (13)
7	(United Kingdom) Paul Bonhomme (1)	1:06.961	1:06.178	(Austria) Hannes Arch (14)

Key
Qualified for next round
Knocked out
Fastest loser, qualified

- ^1 Pilot received 2 seconds in penalties.
- ^2 Pilot received 3 seconds in penalties.

=== Round of 8 ===
Heat	Pilot One	Time One	Time Two	Pilot Two
1	(Hungary) Péter Besenyei (4)	1:07.465	1:06.706	(Japan) Yoshihide Muroya (5)
2	(Czech Republic) Martin Šonka (3)	1:10.114	1:08.088	(France) Nicolas Ivanoff (6)
3	(Australia) Matt Hall (2)	1:06.531	1:06.993	(United Kingdom) Nigel Lamb (8)
4	(United Kingdom) Paul Bonhomme (1)	1:06.542	DNS	(Austria) Hannes Arch (14)

Key
Qualified for next round
Knocked out

=== Final 4 ===
Pos	No.	Pilot	Run Time	Pen
1	55	(United Kingdom) Paul Bonhomme	1:06.416	
2	95	(Australia) Matt Hall	1:09.024	+2sec
3	31	(Japan) Yoshihide Muroya	1:09.426	+2sec
4	27	(France) Nicolas Ivanoff	1:10.804	+2sec

== Challenger Class ==
=== Results ===
Pos	No.	Pilot	Run Time	Pen
1	18	(Czech Republic) Petr Kopfstein	1:20.776	
2	5	(Chile) Cristian Bolton	1:21.920	
3	17	(Sweden) Daniel Ryfa	1:21.982	+2sec
4	37	(Slovenia) Peter Podlunšek	1:22.212	
5	62	(Germany) Florian Berger	1:27.444	
6	77	(Brazil) Francis Barros	1:27.653	+4sec

== Standings after the event ==
Master Class standings

Pos	Pilot	Pts
1	(United Kingdom) Paul Bonhomme	46
2	(Australia) Matt Hall	38
3	(Austria) Hannes Arch	30
4	(Czech Republic) Martin Šonka	18
5	(United Kingdom) Nigel Lamb	17

Challenger Class standings

Pos	Pilot	Pts
1	(Sweden) Daniel Ryfa	28
1	(Czech Republic) Petr Kopfstein	28
3	(Chile) Cristian Bolton	24
4	(France) Mikaël Brageot	22
5	(Slovenia) Peter Podlunšek	14

- Note: Only the top five positions are included for both sets of standings.

Previous race: 2015 Red Bull Air Race of Budapest	Red Bull Air Race; 2015 season	Next race: 2015 Red Bull Air Race of Spielberg
Previous race: 2014 Red Bull Air Race of Ascot	Red Bull Air Race of Ascot	Next race: 2016 Red Bull Air Race of Ascot
