= 2015 Red Bull Air Race of Chiba =

Airplane race in Japan

The 2015 Red Bull Air Race of Chiba was the second round of the 2015 Red Bull Air Race World Championship season, the tenth season of the Red Bull Air Race World Championship. The event was held in Chiba, a port city in Japan.

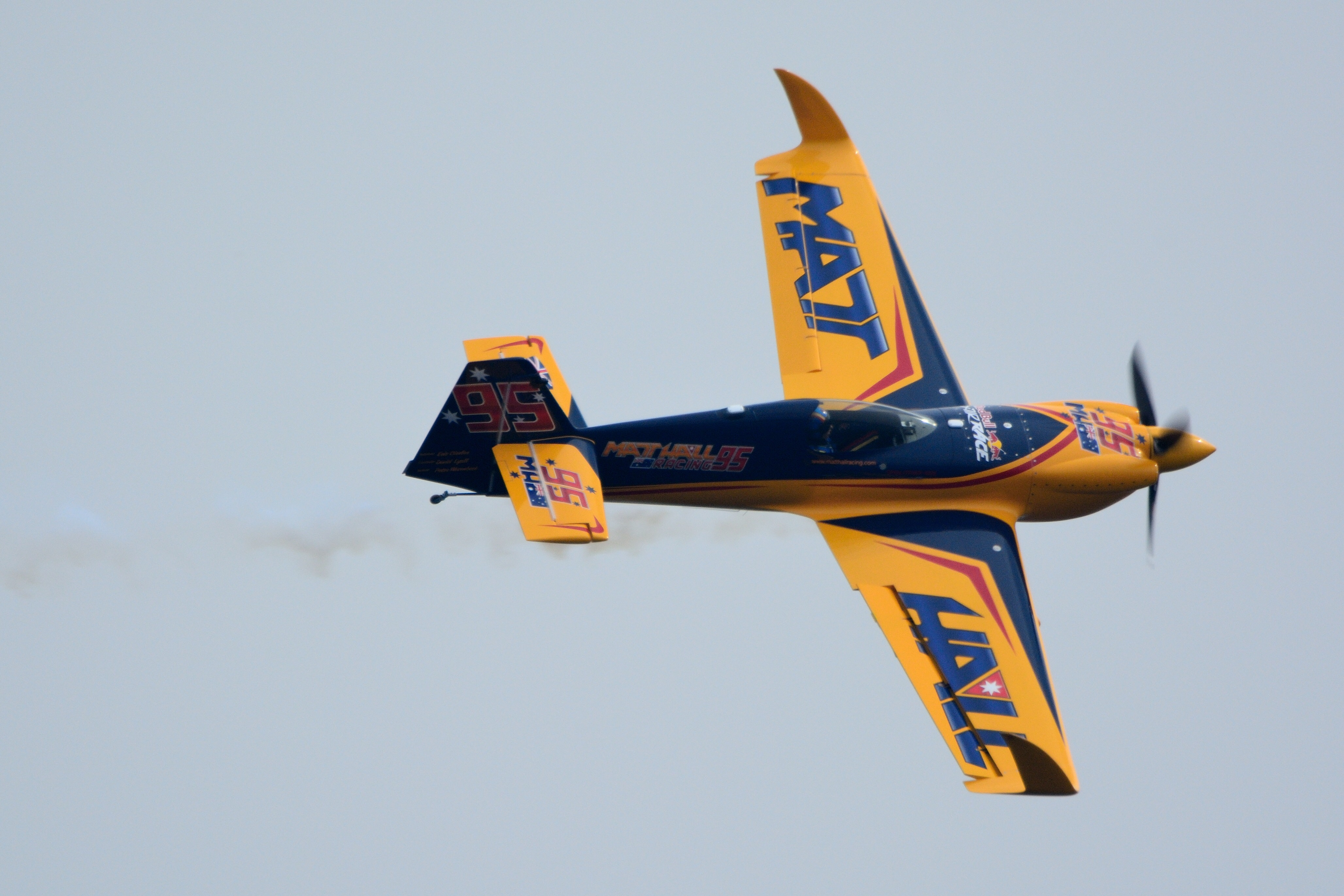
Matt Hall MXS-R

Championship leader Paul Bonhomme took his second victory in as many races, finishing 0.382 seconds clear of Matt Hall, who finished second to Bonhomme as he did in Abu Dhabi. The podium was completed by Matthias Dolderer, who matched his career best result with third place. In the Challenger class, Petr Kopfstein took victory by 0.592 seconds ahead of Daniel Ryfa.

== Master Class ==
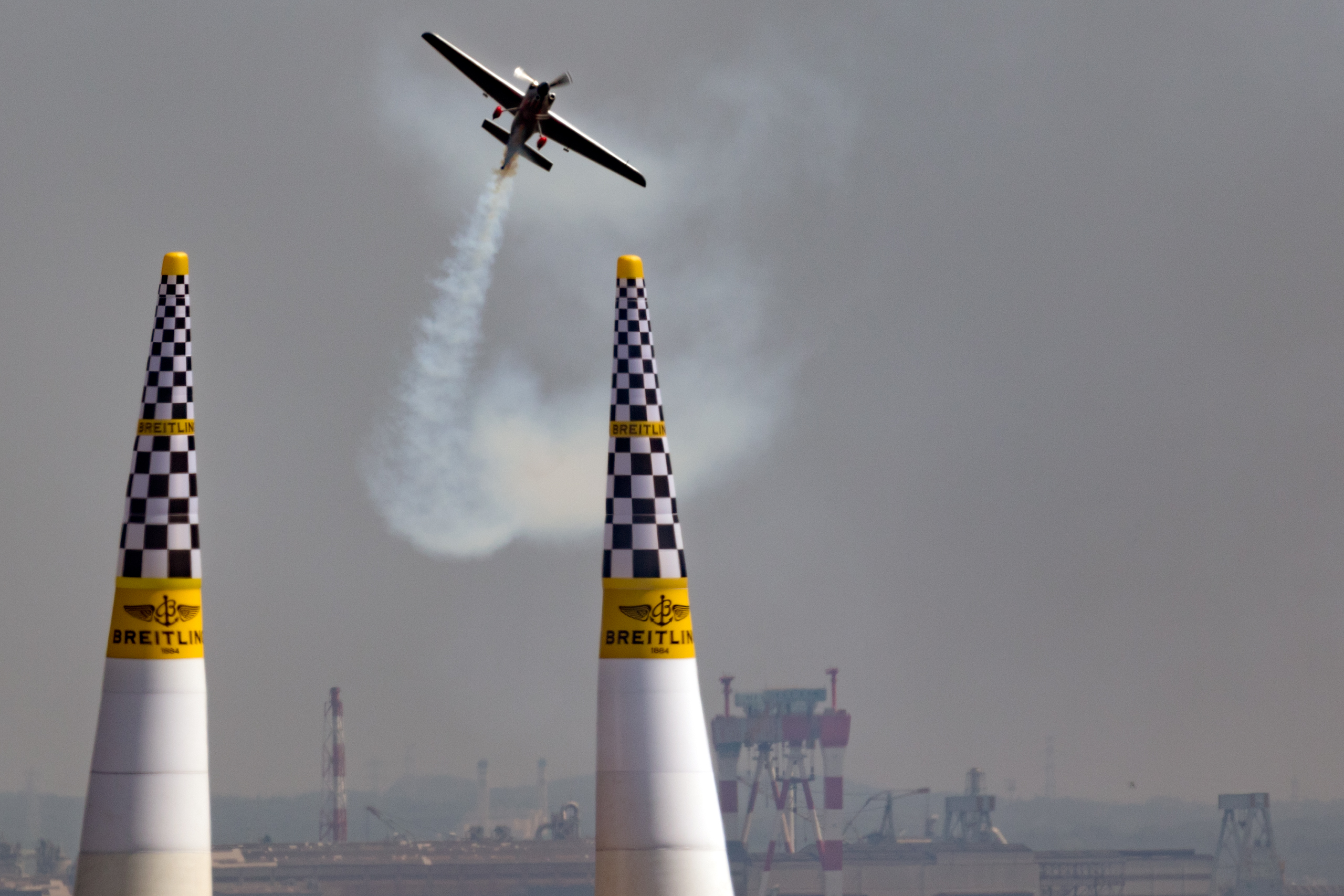
Yoshihide Muroya

=== Qualification ===
Pos	No.	Pilot	Run Time	Pen
1	27	(France) Nicolas Ivanoff	51.102	
2	21	(Germany) Matthias Dolderer	51.530	
3	55	(United Kingdom) Paul Bonhomme	51.653	
4	95	(Australia) Matt Hall	51.951	
5	99	(United States) Michael Goulian	52.014	
6	8	(Czech Republic) Martin Šonka	52.024	
7	10	(United States) Kirby Chambliss	52.086	
8	26	(Spain) Juan Velarde	52.106	
9	31	(Japan) Yoshihide Muroya	52.429	
10	84	(Canada) Pete McLeod	52.614	
11	9	(United Kingdom) Nigel Lamb	53.375	
12	22	(Austria) Hannes Arch	53.416	+2sec
13	91	(Hungary) Péter Besenyei	55.183	
14	12	(France) François Le Vot	DNS	

=== Round of 14 ===
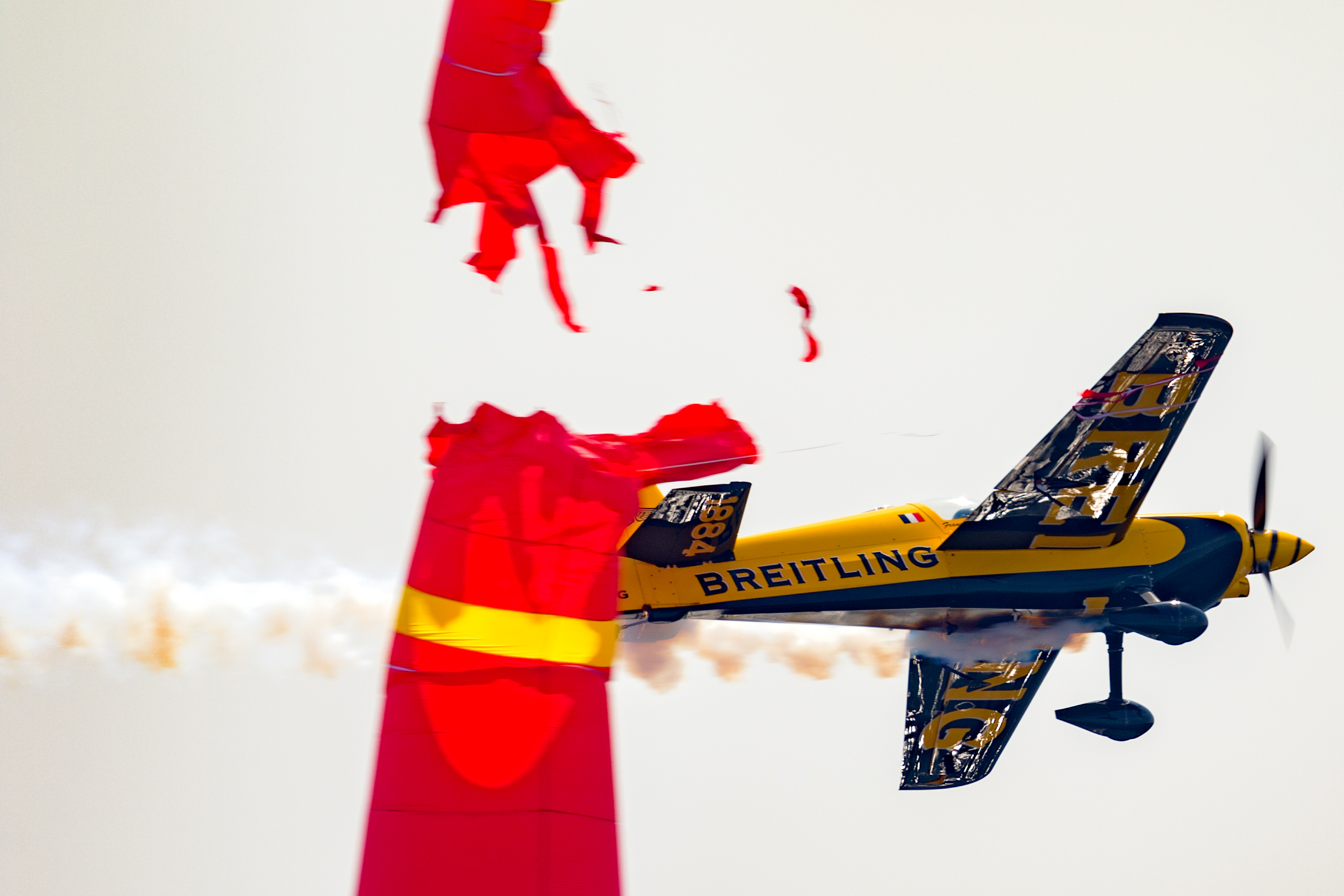
François Le Vot

Heat	Pilot One	Time One	Time Two	Pilot Two
1	(United States) Michael Goulian (5)	52.976	55.782^{3}	(Canada) Pete McLeod (10)
2	(Australia) Matt Hall (4)	50.888	51.826	(United Kingdom) Nigel Lamb (11)
3	(Czech Republic) Martin Šonka (6)	54.753^{1}	50.779	(Japan) Yoshihide Muroya (9)
4	(United Kingdom) Paul Bonhomme (3)	51.560	54.837^{1}	(Austria) Hannes Arch (12)
5	(United States) Kirby Chambliss (7)	54.106	54.241	(Spain) Juan Velarde (8)
6	(Germany) Matthias Dolderer (2)	55.050	59.928^{2}	(Hungary) Péter Besenyei (13)
7	(France) Nicolas Ivanoff (1)	55.101^{1}	1:03.279^{4}	(France) François Le Vot (14)

Key
Qualified for next round
Knocked out
Fastest loser, qualified

- ^1 Pilot received 2 seconds in penalties.
- ^2 Pilot received 4 seconds in penalties.
- ^3 Pilot received 5 seconds in penalties.
- ^4 Pilot received 6 seconds in penalties.

=== Round of 8 ===
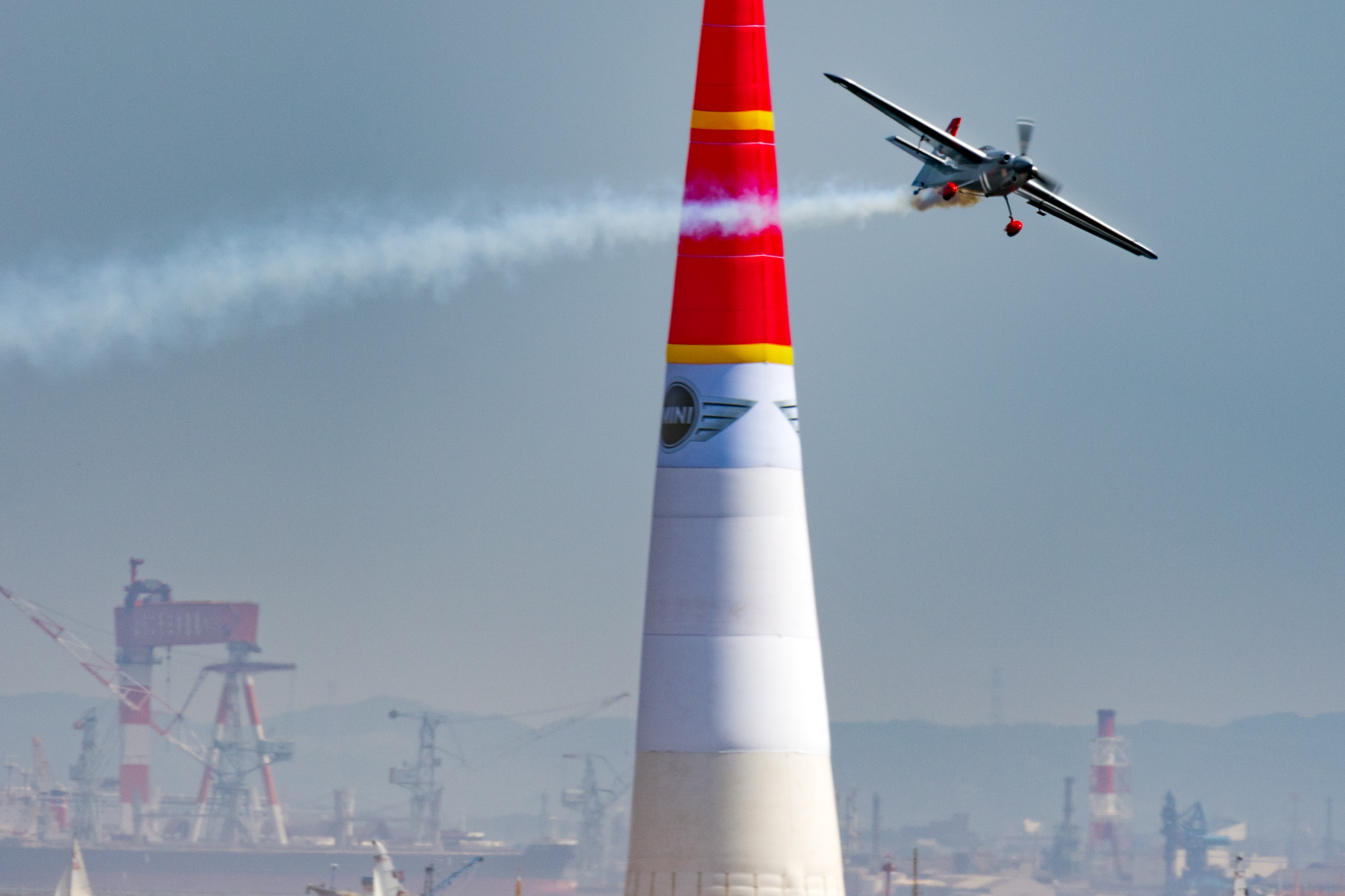
室屋義秀

Heat	Pilot One	Time One	Time Two	Pilot Two
1	(Australia) Matt Hall (4)	51.452	52.917	(United States) Michael Goulian (5)
2	(United Kingdom) Paul Bonhomme (3)	51.392	DNF	(Japan) Yoshihide Muroya (9)
3	(Germany) Matthias Dolderer (2)	52.365	53.631	(United States) Kirby Chambliss (7)
4	(France) Nicolas Ivanoff (1)	52.146	52.448	(United Kingdom) Nigel Lamb (11)

Key
Qualified for next round
Knocked out

=== Final 4 ===
Pos	No.	Pilot	Run Time	Pen
1	55	(United Kingdom) Paul Bonhomme	51.502	
2	95	(Australia) Matt Hall	51.884	
3	21	(Germany) Matthias Dolderer	53.903	+2sec
4	27	(France) Nicolas Ivanoff	DNF	

== Challenger Class ==
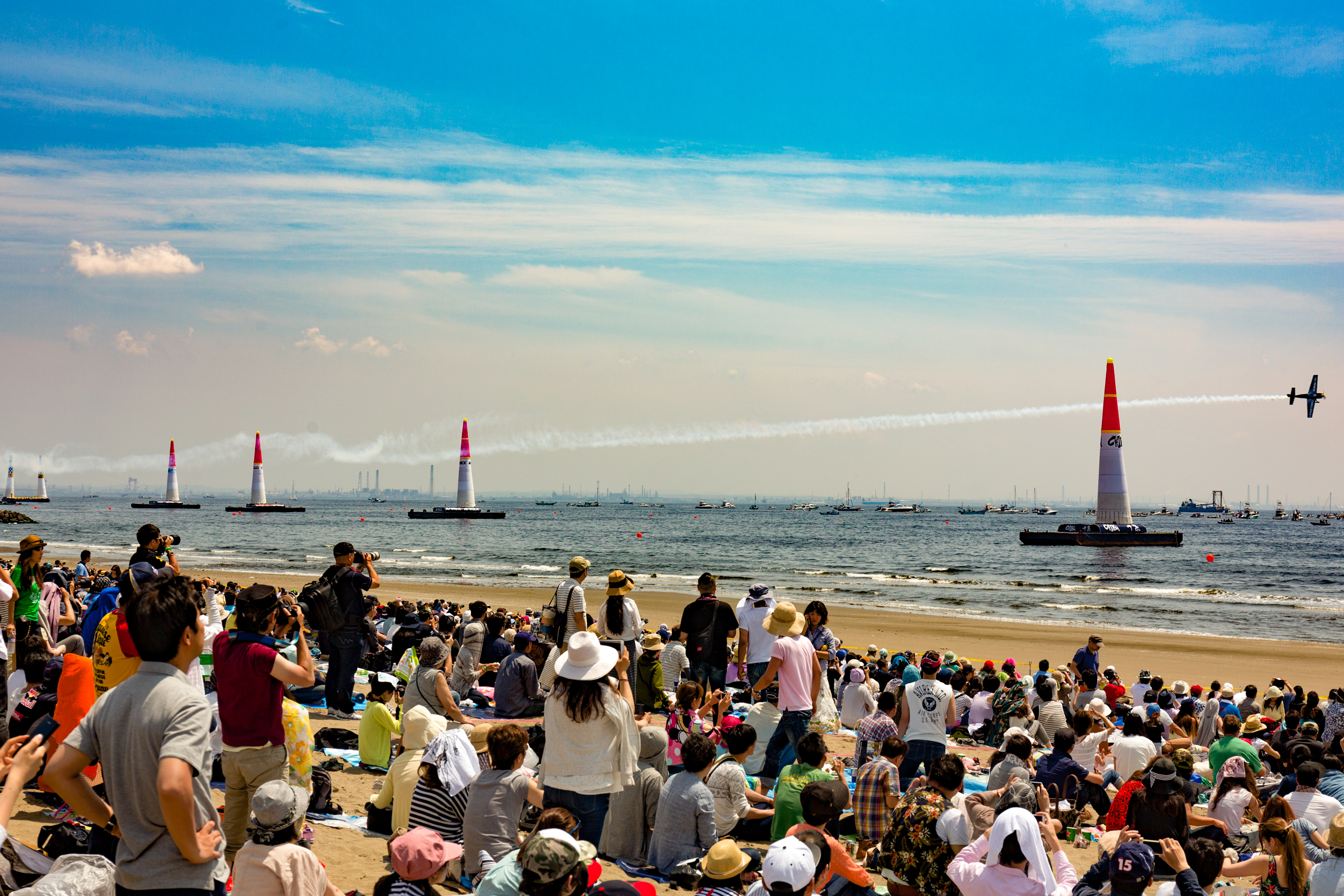
Challenger Class

=== Results ===
Pos	No.	Pilot	Run Time	Pen
1	18	(Czech Republic) Petr Kopfstein	56.584	
2	17	(Sweden) Daniel Ryfa	57.176	
3	5	(Chile) Cristian Bolton	57.865	
4	62	(Germany) Florian Berger	58.340	
5	77	(Brazil) Francis Barros	59.053	
6	37	(Slovenia) Peter Podlunšek	1:01.708	+4sec

== Standings after the event ==
Master Class standings

Pos	Pilot	Pts
1	(United Kingdom) Paul Bonhomme	24
2	(Australia) Matt Hall	18
3	(United Kingdom) Nigel Lamb	8
4	(Germany) Matthias Dolderer	7
4	(Canada) Pete McLeod	7

Challenger Class standings

Pos	Pilot	Pts
1	(Czech Republic) Petr Kopfstein	18
2	(Chile) Cristian Bolton	16
3	(Sweden) Daniel Ryfa	10
4	(Germany) Florian Berger	8
5	(France) Mikaël Brageot	6

- Note: Only the top five positions are included for both sets of standings.

Previous race: 2015 Red Bull Air Race of Abu Dhabi	Red Bull Air Race; 2015 season	Next race: 2015 Red Bull Air Race of Rovinj
Previous race: none	Red Bull Air Race of Chiba	Next race: 2016 Red Bull Air Race of Chiba
