= 2015 Red Bull Air Race of Budapest =

The 2015 Red Bull Air Race of Budapest was the fourth round of the 2015 Red Bull Air Race World Championship season, the tenth season of the Red Bull Air Race World Championship. The event was held on the Danube river in Budapest, Hungary.

Austria's Hannes Arch took his second successive victory by 0.207 seconds ahead of championship leader Paul Bonhomme, with Martin Šonka completing the podium in third place. In the Challenger class, Daniel Ryfa took his second successive win by 0.227 seconds ahead of Mikaël Brageot, with Peter Podlunšek and Petr Kopfstein also finishing within a second of Ryfa.

== Master Class ==
=== Qualification ===
Pos	No.	Pilot	Run Time	Pen
1	95	(Australia) Matt Hall	58.323	
2	31	(Japan) Yoshihide Muroya	59.011	
3	22	(Austria) Hannes Arch	59.328	
4	84	(Canada) Pete McLeod	59.480	
5	10	(United States) Kirby Chambliss	59.496	
6	9	(United Kingdom) Nigel Lamb	59.553	
7	8	(Czech Republic) Martin Šonka	59.756	
8	55	(United Kingdom) Paul Bonhomme	59.812	
9	27	(France) Nicolas Ivanoff	1:00.151	
10	91	(Hungary) Péter Besenyei	1:00.862	
11	12	(France) François Le Vot	1:02.364	
12	26	(Spain) Juan Velarde	1:03.839	+2sec
13	21	(Germany) Matthias Dolderer	1:03.974	+4sec
14	99	(United States) Michael Goulian	1:04.403	+4sec

=== Round of 14 ===
Heat	Pilot One	Time One	Time Two	Pilot Two
1	(Hungary) Péter Besenyei (10)	1:01.070	1:03.386^{1}	(United States) Kirby Chambliss (5)
2	(France) François Le Vot (11)	1:05.976	1:02.866	(Canada) Pete McLeod (4)
3	(France) Nicolas Ivanoff (9)	DNF	DNF^{2}	(United Kingdom) Nigel Lamb (6)
4	(Spain) Juan Velarde (12)	1:06.072^{1}	1:02.497	(Austria) Hannes Arch (3)
5	(United Kingdom) Paul Bonhomme (8)	1:01.028	1:01.088	(Czech Republic) Martin Šonka (7)
6	(Germany) Matthias Dolderer (13)	1:02.072	1:02.279	(Japan) Yoshihide Muroya (2)
7	(United States) Michael Goulian (14)	1:04.953^{1}	58.400	(Australia) Matt Hall (1)

Key
Qualified for next round
Knocked out
Fastest loser, qualified

- ^1 Pilot received 2 seconds in penalties
- ^2 Pilot advanced as they were the higher-placed in qualifying

=== Round of 8 ===
Heat	Pilot One	Time One	Time Two	Pilot Two
1	(Canada) Pete McLeod (4)	59.460	1:00.887	(Hungary) Péter Besenyei (10)
2	(Austria) Hannes Arch (3)	1:02.746	DNF	(United Kingdom) Nigel Lamb (6)
3	(United Kingdom) Paul Bonhomme (8)	1:00.521	1:02.116^{1}	(Germany) Matthias Dolderer (13)
4	(Australia) Matt Hall (1)	59.884	59.701	(Czech Republic) Martin Šonka (7)

Key
Qualified for next round
Knocked out
Fastest loser, qualified

- ^1 Pilot received 2 seconds in penalties

=== Final 4 ===
Pos	No.	Pilot	Run Time	Pen
1	22	(Austria) Hannes Arch	59.350	
2	55	(United Kingdom) Paul Bonhomme	59.557	
3	8	(Czech Republic) Martin Šonka	1:00.658	
4	84	(Canada) Pete McLeod	1:01.113	

== Challenger Class ==
=== Results ===
Pos	No.	Pilot	Run Time	Pen
1	17	(Sweden) Daniel Ryfa	1:09.070	
2	11	(France) Mikaël Brageot	1:09.297	
3	37	(Slovenia) Peter Podlunšek	1:09.713	
4	18	(Czech Republic) Petr Kopfstein	1:09.822	
5	5	(Chile) Cristian Bolton	1:11.686	
6	62	(Germany) Florian Berger	1:11.954	

== Standings after the event ==
Master Class standings

Pos	Pilot	Pts
1	(United Kingdom) Paul Bonhomme	34
2	(Austria) Hannes Arch	29
2	(Australia) Matt Hall	29
4	(Czech Republic) Martin Šonka	16
5	(Canada) Pete McLeod	14

Challenger Class standings

Pos	Pilot	Pts
1	(Sweden) Daniel Ryfa	28
2	(Czech Republic) Petr Kopfstein	22
2	(Chile) Cristian Bolton	22
2	(France) Mikaël Brageot	22
5	(Slovenia) Peter Podlunšek	10

- Note: Only the top five positions are included for both sets of standings.

Previous race: 2015 Red Bull Air Race of Rovinj	Red Bull Air Race; 2015 season	Next race: 2015 Red Bull Air Race of Ascot
Previous race: 2009 Red Bull Air Race of Budapest	Red Bull Air Race of Budapest	Next race: 2016 Red Bull Air Race of Budapest
