= 2015 Red Bull Air Race of Rovinj =

The 2015 Red Bull Air Race of Rovinj was the third round of the 2015 Red Bull Air Race World Championship season, the tenth season of the Red Bull Air Race World Championship. The event was held in Rovinj, a coastal city in Croatia.

The race was won by Austria's Hannes Arch by 0.071 seconds from Martin Šonka, with Matt Hall in third, 0.148 seconds down on Arch's time.

== Master Class ==
=== Qualification ===
Pos	No.	Pilot	Run Time	Pen
1	55	(United Kingdom) Paul Bonhomme	54.266	
2	31	(Japan) Yoshihide Muroya	54.305	
3	95	(Australia) Matt Hall	54.329	
4	21	(Germany) Matthias Dolderer	54.360	
5	8	(Czech Republic) Martin Šonka	54.472	
6	22	(Austria) Hannes Arch	55.205	
7	10	(United States) Kirby Chambliss	56.098	
8	99	(United States) Michael Goulian	57.541	+2sec
9	91	(Hungary) Péter Besenyei	57.714	
10	26	(Spain) Juan Velarde	57.788	
11	12	(France) François Le Vot	59.031	
12	9	(United Kingdom) Nigel Lamb	59.583	+5sec
13	84	(Canada) Pete McLeod	59.592	+5sec
14	27	(France) Nicolas Ivanoff	59.772	+5sec

=== Round of 14 ===
Heat	Pilot One	Time One	Time Two	Pilot Two
1	(Czech Republic) Martin Šonka (5)	55.808	59.765^{1}	(Spain) Juan Velarde (10)
2	(Germany) Matthias Dolderer (4)	58.452^{1}	1:02.068^{2}	(France) François Le Vot (11)
3	(Austria) Hannes Arch (6)	56.106	59.516^{1}	(Hungary) Péter Besenyei (9)
4	(Australia) Matt Hall (3)	54.818	54.702	(United Kingdom) Nigel Lamb (12)
5	(United States) Kirby Chambliss (7)	58.886^{3}	55.601	(United States) Michael Goulian (8)
6	(Japan) Yoshihide Muroya (2)	56.787^{2}	54.091	(Canada) Pete McLeod (13)
7	(United Kingdom) Paul Bonhomme (1)	53.968	55.449	(France) Nicolas Ivanoff (14)

Key
Qualified for next round
Knocked out
Fastest loser, qualified

- ^1 Pilot received 2 seconds in penalties.
- ^2 Pilot received 3 seconds in penalties.
- ^3 Pilot received 4 seconds in penalties.

=== Round of 8 ===
Heat	Pilot One	Time One	Time Two	Pilot Two
1	(Germany) Matthias Dolderer (4)	55.635^{1}	54.216	(Czech Republic) Martin Šonka (5)
2	(Austria) Hannes Arch (6)	53.817	53.964	(United Kingdom) Nigel Lamb (12)
3	(United States) Michael Goulian (8)	55.200	55.888^{1}	(Canada) Pete McLeod (13)
4	(United Kingdom) Paul Bonhomme (1)	DNF	53.166	(Australia) Matt Hall (3)

Key
Qualified for next round
Knocked out

- ^1 Pilot received 2 seconds in penalties.

=== Final 4 ===
Pos	No.	Pilot	Run Time	Pen
1	22	(Austria) Hannes Arch	54.012	
2	8	(Czech Republic) Martin Šonka	54.083	
3	95	(Australia) Matt Hall	54.160	
4	99	(United States) Michael Goulian	DNF	

== Challenger Class ==
=== Results ===
Pos	No.	Pilot	Run Time	Pen
1	17	(Sweden) Daniel Ryfa	1:05.103	
2	11	(France) Mikaël Brageot	1:07.060	
3	5	(Chile) Cristian Bolton	1:08.643	+2sec
4	37	(Slovenia) Peter Podlunšek	1:10.800	+5sec
5	77	(Brazil) Francis Barros	1:13.533	+2sec

== Standings after the event ==
Master Class standings

Pos	Pilot	Pts
1	(United Kingdom) Paul Bonhomme	25
1	(Australia) Matt Hall	25
3	(Austria) Hannes Arch	17
4	(United Kingdom) Nigel Lamb	12
5	(Germany) Matthias Dolderer	10

Challenger Class standings

Pos	Pilot	Pts
1	(Chile) Cristian Bolton	22
2	(Sweden) Daniel Ryfa	20
3	(Czech Republic) Petr Kopfstein	18
4	(France) Mikaël Brageot	14
5	(Germany) Florian Berger	8

- Note: Only the top five positions are included for both sets of standings.

Previous race: 2015 Red Bull Air Race of Chiba	Red Bull Air Race; 2015 season	Next race: 2015 Red Bull Air Race of Budapest
Previous race: 2014 Red Bull Air Race of Rovinj	Red Bull Air Race of Rovinj	Next race: none
