= 2015 Red Bull Air Race of Fort Worth =

The 2015 Red Bull Air Race of Fort Worth was the seventh round of the 2015 Red Bull Air Race World Championship season, the tenth season of the Red Bull Air Race World Championship. The event was held at the Texas Motor Speedway in Fort Worth, Texas.

Championship leader Paul Bonhomme took his fourth victory of the season, finishing 0.767 seconds ahead of title rival Matt Hall, while Yoshihide Muroya matched his best Air Race result, with a third-place finish. In the Challenger class, France's Mikaël Brageot took his second win in succession, 0.208 seconds ahead of Peter Podlunšek.

== Master Class ==
=== Qualification ===
Pos	No.	Pilot	Run Time	Pen
1	21	(Germany) Matthias Dolderer	55.584	
2	31	(Japan) Yoshihide Muroya	55.610	
3	84	(Canada) Pete McLeod	55.621	
4	95	(Australia) Matt Hall	56.598	
5	10	(United States) Kirby Chambliss	56.603	
6	55	(United Kingdom) Paul Bonhomme	56.648	
7	26	(Spain) Juan Velarde	56.976	
8	27	(France) Nicolas Ivanoff	57.110	
9	22	(Austria) Hannes Arch	59.023	+3sec
10	8	(Czech Republic) Martin Šonka	59.128	+2sec
11	9	(United Kingdom) Nigel Lamb	59.159	+2sec
12	99	(United States) Michael Goulian	59.762	
13	91	(Hungary) Péter Besenyei	59.866	+2sec
14	12	(France) François Le Vot	1:02.839	+3sec

=== Round of 14 ===
Heat	Pilot One	Time One	Time Two	Pilot Two
1	(United States) Kirby Chambliss (5)	57.952^{1}	55.846	(Czech Republic) Martin Šonka (10)
2	(Australia) Matt Hall (4)	54.800	54.620	(United Kingdom) Nigel Lamb (11)
3	(United Kingdom) Paul Bonhomme (6)	56.039	57.623^{1}	(Austria) Hannes Arch (9)
4	(Canada) Pete McLeod (3)	56.476	57.307	(United States) Michael Goulian (12)
5	(Spain) Juan Velarde (7)	1:00.443^{2}	59.948^{1}	(France) Nicolas Ivanoff (8)
6	(Japan) Yoshihide Muroya (2)	59.121	1:00.308^{1}	(Hungary) Péter Besenyei (13)
7	(Germany) Matthias Dolderer (1)	57.840	1:02.940^{2}	(France) François Le Vot (14)

Key
Qualified for next round
Knocked out
Fastest loser, qualified

- ^1 Pilot received 2 seconds in penalties.
- ^2 Pilot received 3 seconds in penalties.

=== Round of 8 ===
Heat	Pilot One	Time One	Time Two	Pilot Two
1	(Czech Republic) Martin Šonka (10)	58.046^{1}	1:00.003^{1}	(United Kingdom) Nigel Lamb (11)
2	(Canada) Pete McLeod (3)	DNF	56.452	(United Kingdom) Paul Bonhomme (6)
3	(Japan) Yoshihide Muroya (2)	57.477	1:00.334^{2}	(France) Nicolas Ivanoff (8)
4	(Germany) Matthias Dolderer (1)	56.650	56.290	(Australia) Matt Hall (4)

Key
Qualified for next round
Knocked out

- ^1 Pilot received 2 seconds in penalties.
- ^2 Pilot received 4 seconds in penalties.

=== Final 4 ===
Pos	No.	Pilot	Run Time	Pen
1	55	(United Kingdom) Paul Bonhomme	55.285	
2	95	(Australia) Matt Hall	56.052	
3	31	(Japan) Yoshihide Muroya	59.413	+3sec
4	8	(Czech Republic) Martin Šonka	1:02.900	+5sec

== Challenger Class ==
=== Results ===
Pos	No.	Pilot	Run Time	Pen
1	11	(France) Mikaël Brageot	1:07.614	
2	37	(Slovenia) Peter Podlunšek	1:07.822	
3	62	(Germany) Florian Berger	1:10.272	+3sec
4	5	(Chile) Cristian Bolton	1:10.422	+3sec
5	77	(Brazil) Francis Barros	1:16.143	+2sec
6	18	(Czech Republic) Petr Kopfstein	DNF	

== Standings after the event ==
Master Class standings

Pos	Pilot	Pts
1	(United Kingdom) Paul Bonhomme	67
2	(Australia) Matt Hall	59
3	(Austria) Hannes Arch	30
4	(Czech Republic) Martin Šonka	28
5	(United Kingdom) Nigel Lamb	20

Challenger Class standings

Pos	Pilot	Pts
1	(France) Mikaël Brageot	28
1	(Czech Republic) Petr Kopfstein	28
1	(Sweden) Daniel Ryfa	28
4	(Chile) Cristian Bolton	24
5	(Slovenia) Peter Podlunšek	18

- Note: Only the top five positions are included for both sets of standings.

Previous race: 2015 Red Bull Air Race of Spielberg	Red Bull Air Race; 2015 season	Next race: 2015 Red Bull Air Race of Las Vegas
Previous race: 2014 Red Bull Air Race of Fort Worth	Red Bull Air Race of Fort Worth	Next race: 2016 Red Bull Air Race of Fort Worth
