= 2015 Red Bull Air Race of Spielberg =

The 2015 Red Bull Air Race of Spielberg was the sixth round of the 2015 Red Bull Air Race World Championship season, the tenth season of the Red Bull Air Race World Championship. The event was held at the Red Bull Ring, in Spielberg, Austria.

After nine previous podium finishes, Australian pilot Matt Hall took his first Air Race victory by 0.057 seconds ahead of championship leader Paul Bonhomme, while American Kirby Chambliss took his first podium since June 2010 in third place. In the Challenger class, French pilot Mikaël Brageot took his first victory of the season, finishing 0.126 seconds clear of Petr Kopfstein.

== Master Class ==
=== Qualification ===
Constant poor weather conditions, including heavy rain and low clouds forced the Race Committee to cancel the Qualifying round. According to the official rules, the start list of the Round of 14 on Sunday was based on the pre-event World Championship rankings.

=== Round of 14 ===
| Heat | Pilot One | Time One | Time Two | Pilot Two |
|---|---|---|---|---|
| 1 | (United Kingdom) Nigel Lamb (5) | DNF | 58.576^{1} | (United States) Michael Goulian (10) |
| 2 | (Czech Republic) Martin Šonka (4) | 57.688 | 57.939 | (Hungary) Péter Besenyei (11) |
| 3 | (Canada) Pete McLeod (6) | 57.027 | 58.138 | (France) Nicolas Ivanoff (9) |
| 4 | (Austria) Hannes Arch (3) | DNF | 58.876 | (United States) Kirby Chambliss (12) |
| 5 | (Germany) Matthias Dolderer (7) | 59.811 | 1:00.736^{2} | (Japan) Yoshihide Muroya (8) |
| 6 | (Australia) Matt Hall (2) | 1:02.426^{3} | 1:05.853^{4} | (Spain) Juan Velarde (13) |
| 7 | (United Kingdom) Paul Bonhomme (1) | 1:01.536^{2} | DNF | (France) François Le Vot (14) |

Key
Qualified for next round
Knocked out
Fastest loser, qualified

- ^1 Pilot received 1 second in penalties.
- ^2 Pilot received 2 seconds in penalties.
- ^3 Pilot received 3 seconds in penalties.
- ^4 Pilot received 7 seconds in penalties.

=== Round of 8 ===
| Heat | Pilot One | Time One | Time Two | Pilot Two |
|---|---|---|---|---|
| 1 | (Czech Republic) Martin Šonka (4) | 58.698 | 1:01.609 | (United States) Michael Goulian (10) |
| 2 | (Canada) Pete McLeod (6) | 58.912 | 58.258 | (United States) Kirby Chambliss (12) |
| 3 | (Australia) Matt Hall (2) | 57.721 | 1:00.572^{1} | (Germany) Matthias Dolderer (7) |
| 4 | (United Kingdom) Paul Bonhomme (1) | 57.553 | DSQ | (Hungary) Péter Besenyei (11) |

Key
Qualified for next round
Knocked out

- ^1 Pilot received 2 seconds in penalties.

=== Final 4 ===
| Pos | No. | Pilot | Run Time | Pen |
|---|---|---|---|---|
| 1 | 95 | (Australia) Matt Hall | 56.851 | |
| 2 | 55 | (United Kingdom) Paul Bonhomme | 56.908 | |
| 3 | 10 | (United States) Kirby Chambliss | 58.291 | |
| 4 | 8 | (Czech Republic) Martin Šonka | 58.422 | |

== Challenger Class ==
=== Results ===
| Pos | No. | Pilot | Run Time | Pen |
|---|---|---|---|---|
| 1 | 11 | (France) Mikaël Brageot | 1:05.576 | |
| 2 | 18 | (Czech Republic) Petr Kopfstein | 1:05.702 | |
| 3 | 17 | (Sweden) Daniel Ryfa | 1:07.080 | |
| 4 | 37 | (Slovenia) Peter Podlunšek | 1:08.305 | |
| 5 | 62 | (Germany) Florian Berger | 1:09.366 | |
| 6 | 77 | (Brazil) Francis Barros | 1:13.990 | +4sec |

== Standings after the event ==
Master Class standings

| Pos | Pilot | Pts |
|---|---|---|
| 1 | (United Kingdom) Paul Bonhomme | 55 |
| 2 | (Australia) Matt Hall | 50 |
| 3 | (Austria) Hannes Arch | 30 |
| 4 | (Czech Republic) Martin Šonka | 23 |
| 5 | (Canada) Pete McLeod | 18 |

Challenger Class standings

| Pos | Pilot | Pts |
|---|---|---|
| 1 | (Czech Republic) Petr Kopfstein | 28 |
| 1 | (Sweden) Daniel Ryfa | 28 |
| 3 | (France) Mikaël Brageot | 26 |
| 4 | (Chile) Cristian Bolton | 24 |
| 5 | (Slovenia) Peter Podlunšek | 14 |

- Note: Only the top five positions are included for both sets of standings.

| Previous race: 2015 Red Bull Air Race of Ascot | Red Bull Air Race; 2015 season | Next race: 2015 Red Bull Air Race of Fort Worth |
| Previous race: 2014 Red Bull Air Race of Spielberg | Red Bull Air Race of Spielberg | Next race: 2016 Red Bull Air Race of Spielberg |
