= 2015 Red Bull Air Race of Abu Dhabi =

The 2015 Red Bull Air Race of Abu Dhabi was the first round of the 2015 Red Bull Air Race World Championship season, the tenth season of the Red Bull Air Race World Championship. The event was held in Abu Dhabi, the capital of the United Arab Emirates.

Paul Bonhomme from Great Britain took the opening race victory, finishing 0.084 seconds ahead of Australian pilot Matt Hall. The podium was completed by Canada's Pete McLeod, after Hannes Arch received a two-second time penalty. In the Challenger class, Chile's Cristian Bolton took the opening win ahead of Petr Kopfstein from the Czech Republic, while Mikaël Brageot completed the podium, after Daniel Ryfa received a two-second time penalty.

== Master Class ==
=== Qualification ===
Pos	No.	Pilot	Run Time	Pen
1	55	(United Kingdom) Paul Bonhomme	57.178	
2	95	(Australia) Matt Hall	57.800	
3	31	(Japan) Yoshihide Muroya	59.093	
4	10	(United States) Kirby Chambliss	1:00.036	
5	21	(Germany) Matthias Dolderer	1:00.111	+2sec
6	84	(Canada) Pete McLeod	1:00.256	+2sec
7	99	(United States) Michael Goulian	1:00.716	
8	27	(France) Nicolas Ivanoff	1:00.788	+2sec
9	26	(Spain) Juan Velarde	1:01.514	
10	22	(Austria) Hannes Arch	1:01.527	+4sec
11	91	(Hungary) Péter Besenyei	1:02.208	
12	8	(Czech Republic) Martin Šonka	1:02.628	+4sec
13	12	(France) François Le Vot	1:03.649	+2sec
14	9	(United Kingdom) Nigel Lamb	DSQ	

=== Round of 14 ===
Heat	Pilot One	Time One	Time Two	Pilot Two
1	(Germany) Matthias Dolderer (5)	57.653	58.698	(Austria) Hannes Arch (10)
2	(United States) Kirby Chambliss (4)	DNS	1:03.899 ^{1}	(Hungary) Péter Besenyei (11)
3	(Canada) Pete McLeod (6)	1:00.901^{1}	1:08.541^{3}	(Spain) Juan Velarde (9)
4	(Japan) Yoshihide Muroya (3)	58.280	1:00.210^{1}	(Czech Republic) Martin Šonka (12)
5	(United States) Michael Goulian (7)	1:00.872^{1}	1:02.278^{2}	(France) Nicolas Ivanoff (8)
6	(Australia) Matt Hall (2)	1:00.278^{1}	1:01.014	(France) François Le Vot (13)
7	(United Kingdom) Paul Bonhomme (1)	56.901	57.108	(United Kingdom) Nigel Lamb (14)

Key
Qualified for next round
Knocked out
Fastest loser, qualified

- ^1 Pilot received 2 seconds in penalties
- ^2 Pilot received 4 seconds in penalties
- ^3 Pilot received 8 seconds in penalties

=== Round of 8 ===
Heat	Pilot One	Time One	Time Two	Pilot Two
1	(Austria) Hannes Arch (10)	59.760^{1}	59.852	(Hungary) Péter Besenyei (11)
2	(Japan) Yoshihide Muroya (3)	59.597	59.116	(Canada) Pete McLeod (6)
3	(Australia) Matt Hall (2)	58.520	1:01.814^{2}	(France) Nicolas Ivanoff (8)
4	(United Kingdom) Paul Bonhomme (1)	58.094	59.576	(United Kingdom) Nigel Lamb (14)

Key
Qualified for next round
Knocked out

- ^1 Pilot received 1 second in penalties
- ^2 Pilot received 2 seconds in penalties

=== Final 4 ===
Pos	No.	Pilot	Run Time	Pen
1	55	(United Kingdom) Paul Bonhomme	57.787	
2	95	(Australia) Matt Hall	57.871	
3	84	(Canada) Pete McLeod	58.843	
4	22	(Austria) Hannes Arch	1:00.233	+2sec

== Challenger Class ==
=== Results ===
Pos	No.	Pilot	Run Time	Pen
1	5	(Chile) Cristian Bolton	1:02.231	
2	18	(Czech Republic) Petr Kopfstein	1:02.605	
3	11	(France) Mikaël Brageot	1:03.025	
4	62	(Germany) Florian Berger	1:03.597	
5	17	(Sweden) Daniel Ryfa	1:04.735	+2sec
6	77	(Brazil) Francis Barros	DSQ	

== Standings after the event ==
Master Class standings

Pos	Pilot	Pts
1	(United Kingdom) Paul Bonhomme	12
2	(Australia) Matt Hall	9
3	(Canada) Pete McLeod	7
4	(Austria) Hannes Arch	5
5	(United Kingdom) Nigel Lamb	4

Challenger Class standings

Pos	Pilot	Pts
1	(Chile) Cristian Bolton	10
2	(Czech Republic) Petr Kopfstein	8
3	(France) Mikaël Brageot	6
4	(Germany) Florian Bergér	4
5	(Sweden) Daniel Ryfa	2

- Note: Only the top five positions are included for both sets of standings.

Previous race: 2014 Red Bull Air Race of Spielberg	Red Bull Air Race; 2015 season	Next race: 2015 Red Bull Air Race of Chiba
Previous race: 2014 Red Bull Air Race of Abu Dhabi	Red Bull Air Race of Abu Dhabi	Next race: 2016 Red Bull Air Race of Abu Dhabi
