= Petr Kopfstein =

Czech acrobatic flyer

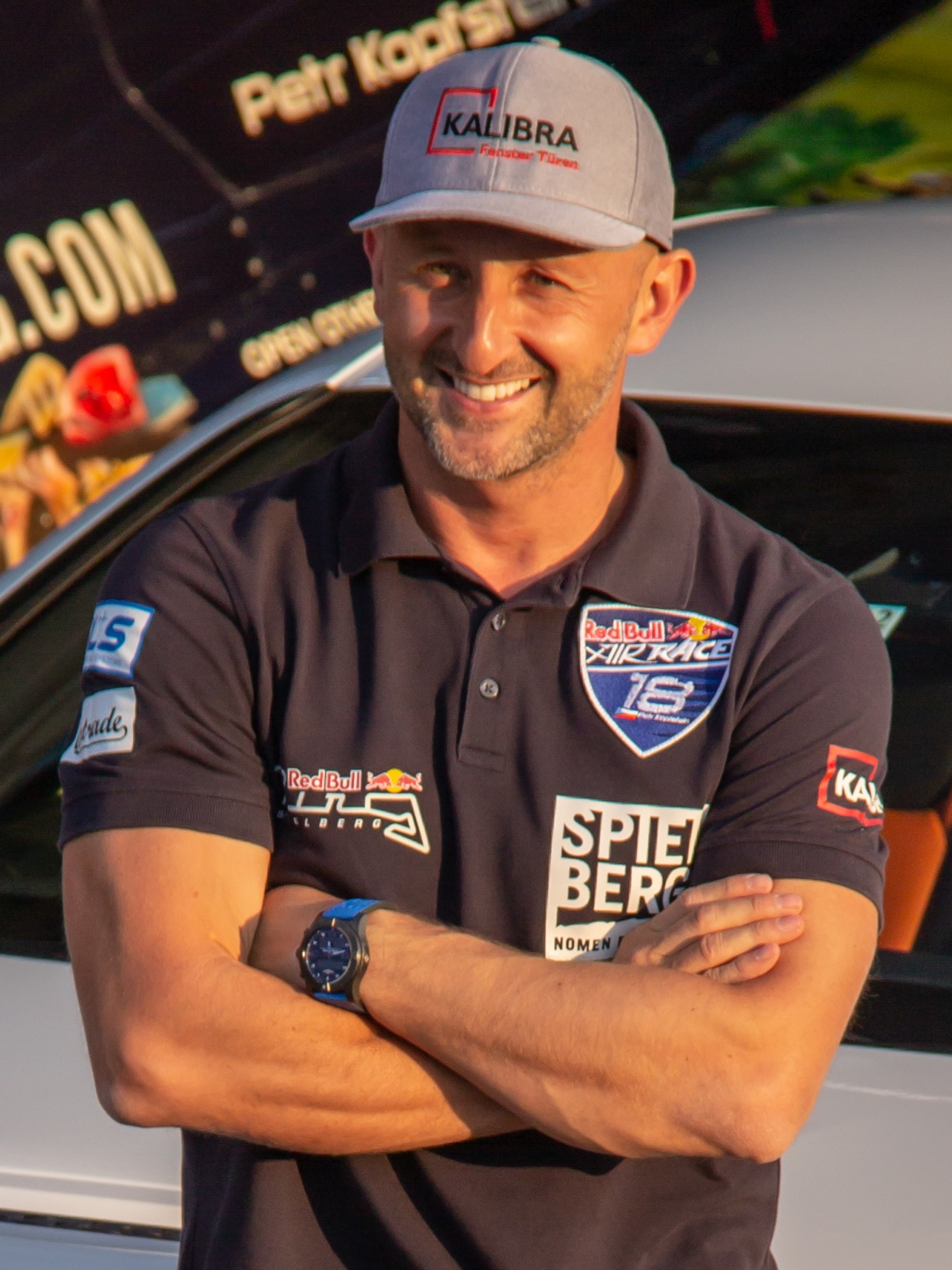
- Born: March 18, 1978 (age 48); Karlovy Vary, Czechoslovakia
- Aviation career

Racing career
- First race: 2014
- Best position: 1st in RBAR Challenger Cup, 2014
- Aircraft: Extra 330 (2014-2015), Zivko Edge 540 (from 2016)
- Website: Kopfstein.com

Petr Kopfstein (born March 18, 1978) is a Czech aerobatic pilot, representing the Czech Republic in flying aerobatics in an Unlimited category, and most recently a racer in the Master Class category of the Red Bull Air Race. He is the first winner of the Red Bull Air Race Challenger Cup. After his victory of the whole Challenger Cup in 2014, there were rumors about him moving to Masters; it became a reality for the 2016 season. Péter Besenyei and Paul Bonhomme departed from the series.

In 2014, Petr Kopfstein won the Czech National Championship in the Unlimited category, beating his mate and aerobatic colleague Martin Šonka. He flew an Extra 300SC.

In 2015, Petr Kopfstein participated again in the Red Bull Air Race Challenger Cup, taking 4th place at the end of the series. All in all, he grabbed 28 points in total, for a three-way tie for 1st place in the point-based ranking.

On 19 January 2016, it was confirmed by the RBAR Management that Petr will move to the main "Masters" category for the 2016 season, together with Peter Podlunsek of Slovenia.

== Successes ==
Red Bull Air Race

(Czech Republic) Petr Kopfstein at the Red Bull Air Race World Championship
Year	1	2	3	4	5	6	7	8	Points	Wins	Rank
Challenger Cup
2014	(United Arab Emirates); 4th	(Croatia); DNP	(Malaysia); 2nd	(Poland); 4th	(United Kingdom); DNP	(United States); DNP	(United States); 2nd	(Austria); 1st	20	0	1st
2015	(United Arab Emirates); 2nd	(Japan); 1st	(Croatia); DNP	(Hungary); 4th	(United Kingdom); 1st	(Austria); 2nd	(United States); SCO	(United States); 4th	28	0	4th
Master Class
2016	(United Arab Emirates); 13th	(Austria); 11th	(Japan); 9th	(Hungary); 11th	(United Kingdom); 14th	(Germany); 11th	(United States); 9th	(United States); CAN	4	0	14th
2017	(United Arab Emirates); 12th	(United States); 6th	(Japan); 2nd	(Hungary); 5th	(Russia); 4th	(Portugal); 7th	(Germany); 8th	(United States); 5th	43	0	5th
2018	(United Arab Emirates); 9th	(France); 9th	(Japan); 9th	(Hungary); 9th	(Russia); 9th	(Austria); 5th	(United States); 13th	(United States); 12th	16	0	13th
2019	(United Arab Emirates); 10th								4	0	10th

Legend: * CAN: Cancelled * DNP: Did not take part * DNS: Did not start * DSQ: Disqualified * SCO: Safety Climb-Out

Flying Aerobatics

- 2015 - 4th place Red Bull Air Race Challenger Cup, 13th place WAC Châteauroux France, 2nd place Czech National Championships in Unlimited Aerobatics, 1st place in the international competition "Karlovarský pohár" in Unlimited
- 2014 - 1st place Red Bull Air Race Challenger Cup, 1st place Czech National Championships in Unlimited Aerobatics, 16th place EAC Hungary
- 2013 - 14th place WAC Texas, USA, 2nd place Czech National Championships in Unlimited Aerobatics
- 2012 - 1st place in the international competition "Karlovarský pohár" in Advanced, 5th place in one-day aerobatic race Aerobatic Freestyle Challenge, Prague

== Gyarary ==
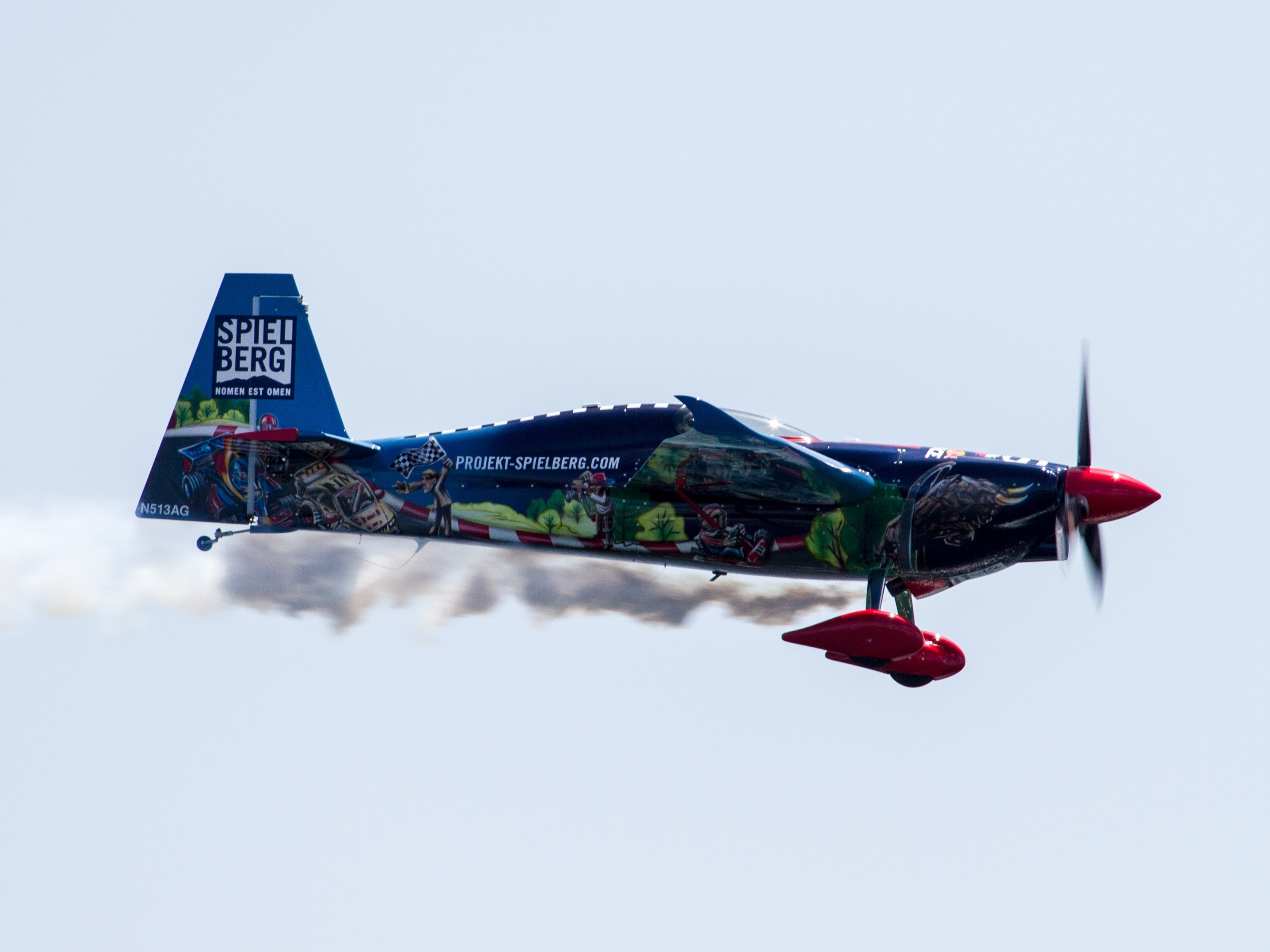
