= François Le Vot =

French Air Racer

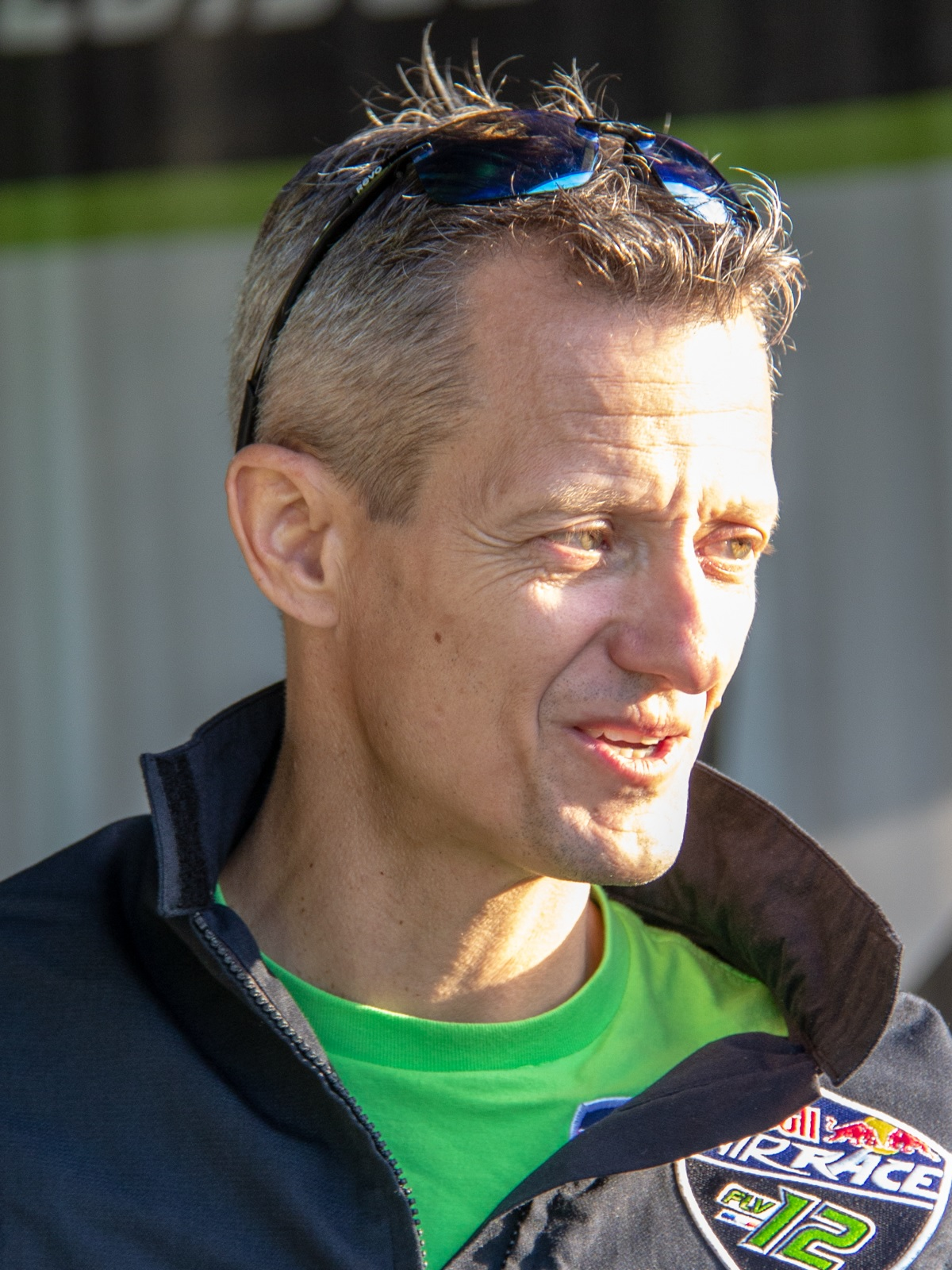
- Born: May 2, 1970 (age 56)
- Aviation career
- Air force: French Air Force

Racing career
- First race: Challenger: Abu Dhabi 2014; Master: Abu Dhabi 2015
- Best position: 14th (2015)
- Aircraft: Zivko Edge 540

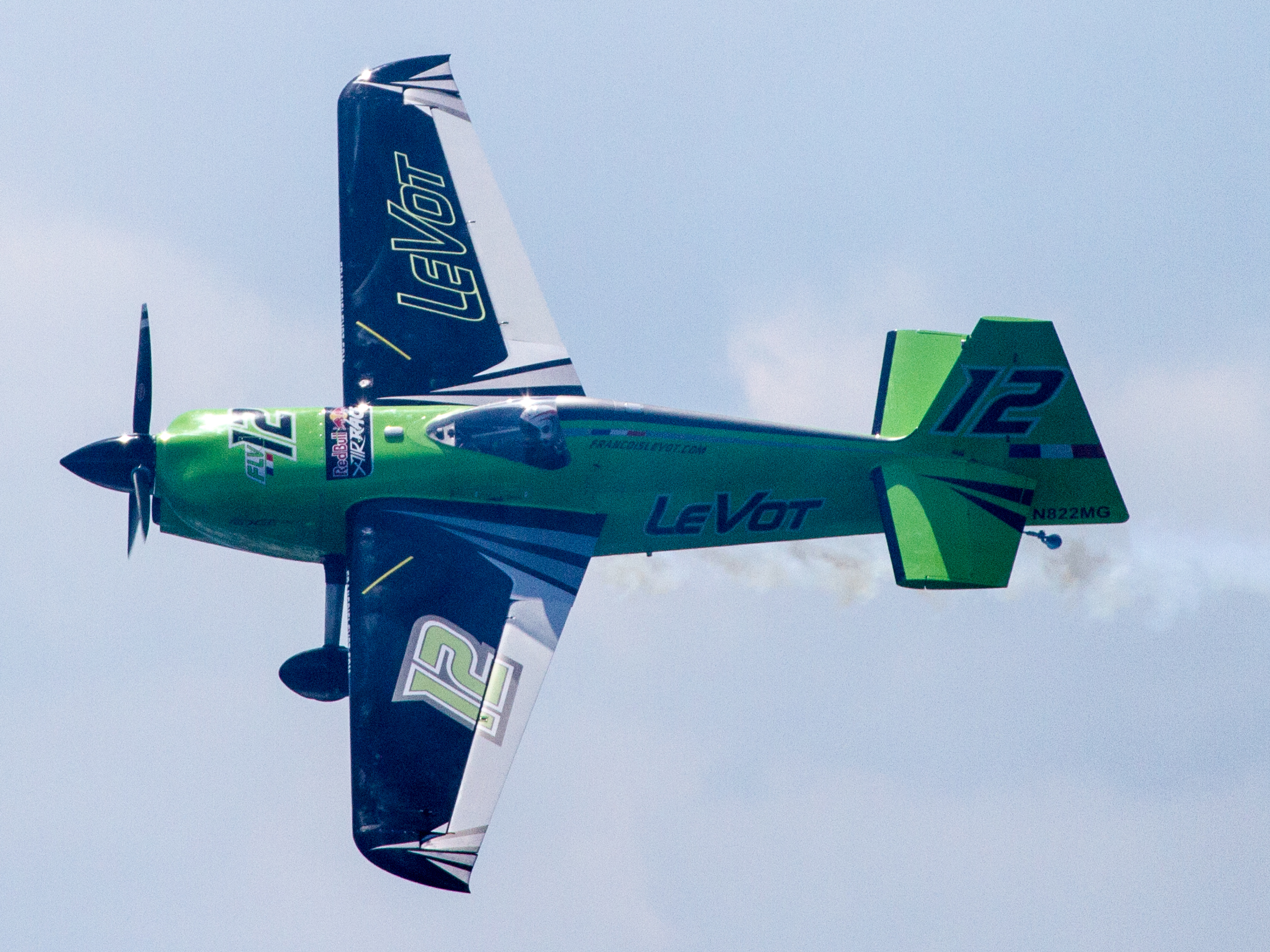
2017 Red Bull Air Race of Chiba - N822MG

François Le Vot (French: [fʁɑ̃swa lə vo]) is a fighter pilot in the French air force, presenter and international competitor in aerobatics, most notably in the Red Bull Air Race. He was leader of the aerobatic team of the French Air Force and was 2013 Aerobatics World Champion.

== Biography ==
Le Vot made his Red Bull Air Race debut in the 2014 Challenger Cup, winning races in Abu Dhabi, Rovinj and Putrajaya and ending up at 4th place in 2014 Challenger Cup after final winner-takes-all race. He moved up into the Master Class in 2015, however neither his nor fellow debutant Juan Velarde's race-planes were as fast as their competitors' (estimates range between 10-15 knots down) and both failed to score a point all season. Having resolved the issue in the off-season, Le Vot placed third in the first round of 2016 in Abu Dhabi.

== Results ==
Year	Class	Aircraft	1	2	3	4	5	6	7	8	Position	Points
2015	Master	Zivko Edge 540	ABU; 11	CHI; 14	ROV; 14	BUD; 12	ASC; 14	SPE; DSQ	FTW; 14	LVG; 14	14th	0
2016	Master	Zivko Edge 540	ABU; 3	SPE; 12	CHI; 10	BUD; 14	ASC; 12	LAU; 12	IND; 12	LVG; CAN	12th	10
2017	Master	Zivko Edge 540	ABU; 8	SDE; 12	CHI; 14	BUD; 10	KAZ; 7	POR; 13	LAU; 10	IND; 12	14th	9
2018	Master	Zivko Edge 540	ABU; 7	CEQ; 11	CHI; 6	BUD; 5	KAZ; 6	WIN; 10	IND; 14	FTW; 10	11th	22
2019	Master	Zivko Edge 540	ABU; 12								12th	2
