= Juan Velarde (aviator) =

Spanish pilot (born 1974)

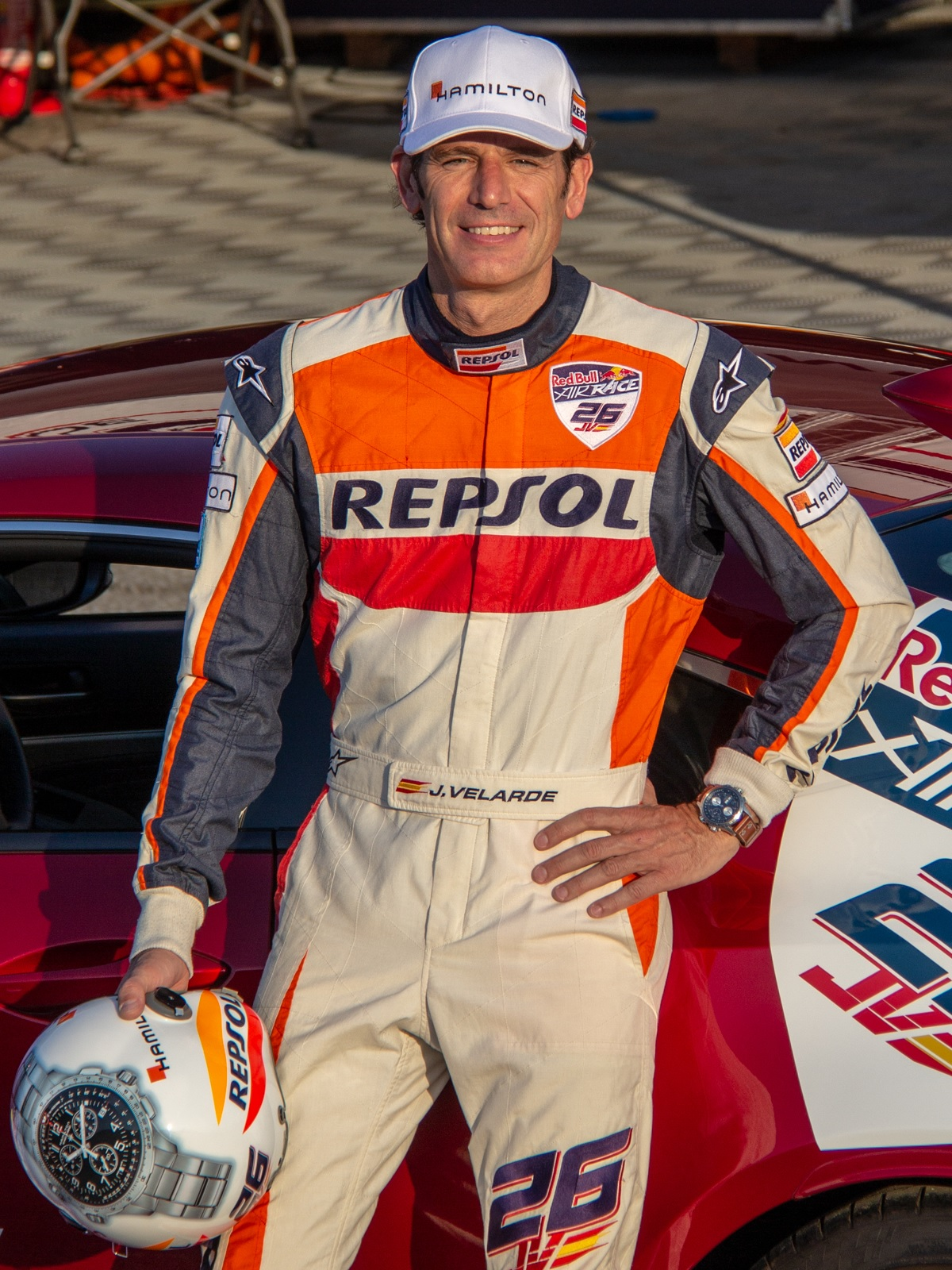
- Born: September 19, 1974 (age 52); Madrid, Spain
- Aviation career

Racing career
- First race: Challenger: Abu Dhabi 2014; Master: Abu Dhabi 2015
- Best position: 11th (2016)
- Aircraft: Zivko Edge 540
- Website: https://www.juanvelarde26.com

Juan Velarde is a Spanish pilot who currently competes in the Red Bull Air Race World Championship. He has extensive amounts of experience with various types of aircraft and is currently Spain's top pilot.

In 2014 he joined the Challenger Class of the Red Bull Air Race. He was promoted to the Master Class in 2015, but he failed to score a point all season, finishing ahead of only fellow Master Class debutant and 2014 Challenger Class champion, François Le Vot. His 2016 campaign started strongly, finishing as the top qualifier in Spielberg.

== Results ==
=== Challenger Class ===
Year	1	2	3	4	5	6	7	8	Points	Wins	Position
2014	(United Arab Emirates); 3rd	(Croatia); DNP	(Malaysia); 4th	(Poland); DNP	(United Kingdom); DNP	(United States); DSQ	(United States); 4th	(Australia); DNP	14	0	8th

=== Master Class ===
Year	1	2	3	4	5	6	7	8	Points	Wins	Position
2015	(United Arab Emirates); 13th	(Japan); 9th	(Croatia); 13th	(Hungary); 13th	(United Kingdom); 11th	(Austria); 11th	(United States); 13th	(United States); 9th	0	0	13th
2016	(United Arab Emirates); 10th	(Austria); 14th	(Japan); 5th	(Hungary); 8th	(United Kingdom); 11th	(Germany); 9th	(United States); 8th	(United States); CAN	14.25	0	11th
2017	(United Arab Emirates); 2nd	(United States); 11th	(Japan); 10th	(Hungary); 9th	(Russia); 5th	(Portugal); DNS	(Germany); 4th	(United States); 3rd	56	0	8th
2018	(United Arab Emirates); 11th	(France); 6th	(Japan); 7th	(Hungary); 13th	(Russia); 4th	(Austria); 11th	(United States); 7th	(United States); 7th	24	0	9th
2019	(United Arab Emirates); 6th								14	0	6th

*season in progress

== Gallery ==
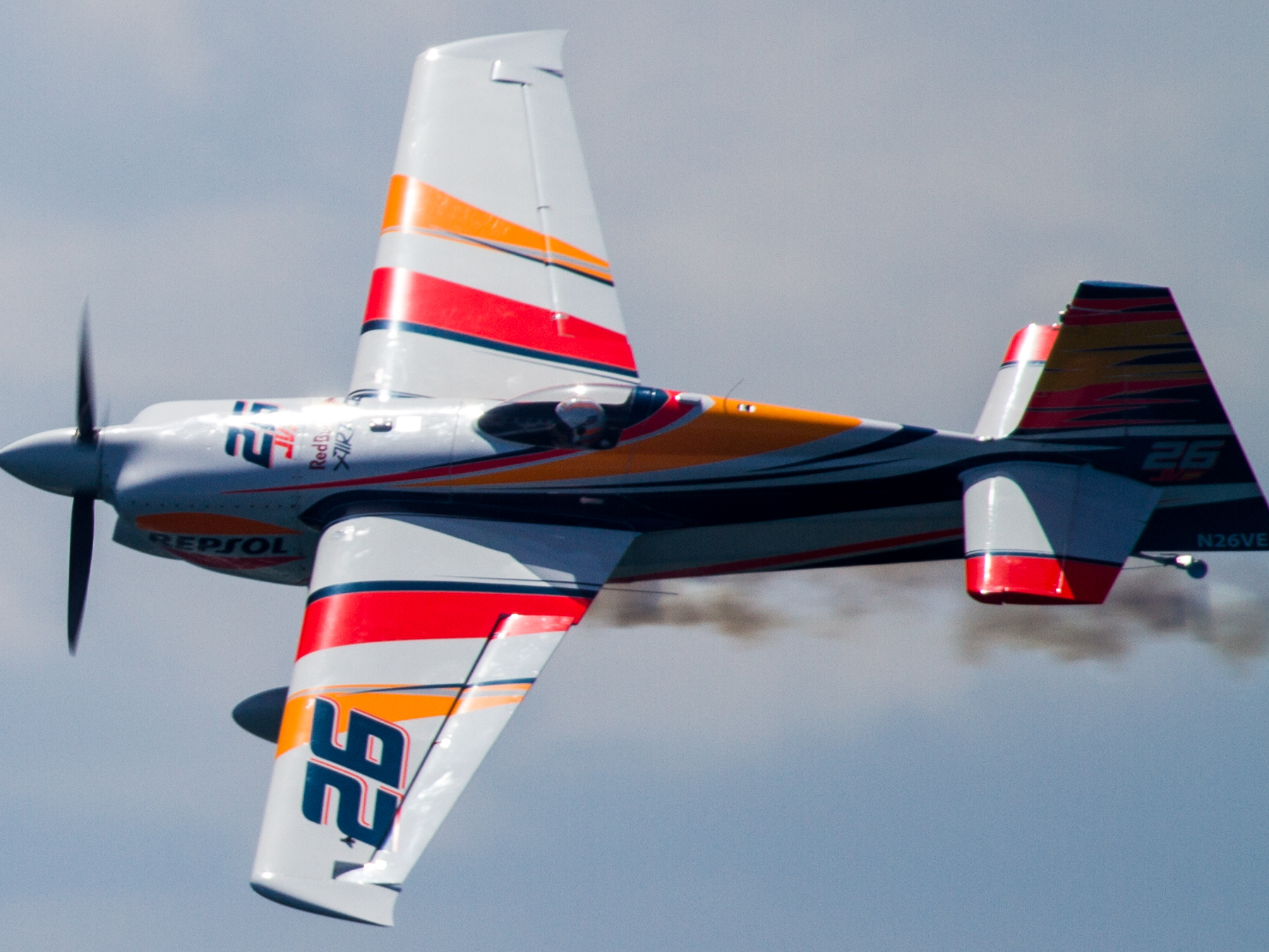
2017 Red Bull Air Race of Chiba N26VE
