= Pete McLeod =

Canadian professional aerobatic pilot

- Pete McLeod
- Born: 23 February 1984 (age 42); Kapuskasing, Ontario, Canada
- Years active: 1998-
- Aviation career

Racing career
- First race: 2009
- Best position: 1st (2014)
- Aircraft: Edge 540, Giles G-200
- Website: www.petemcleodracing.com

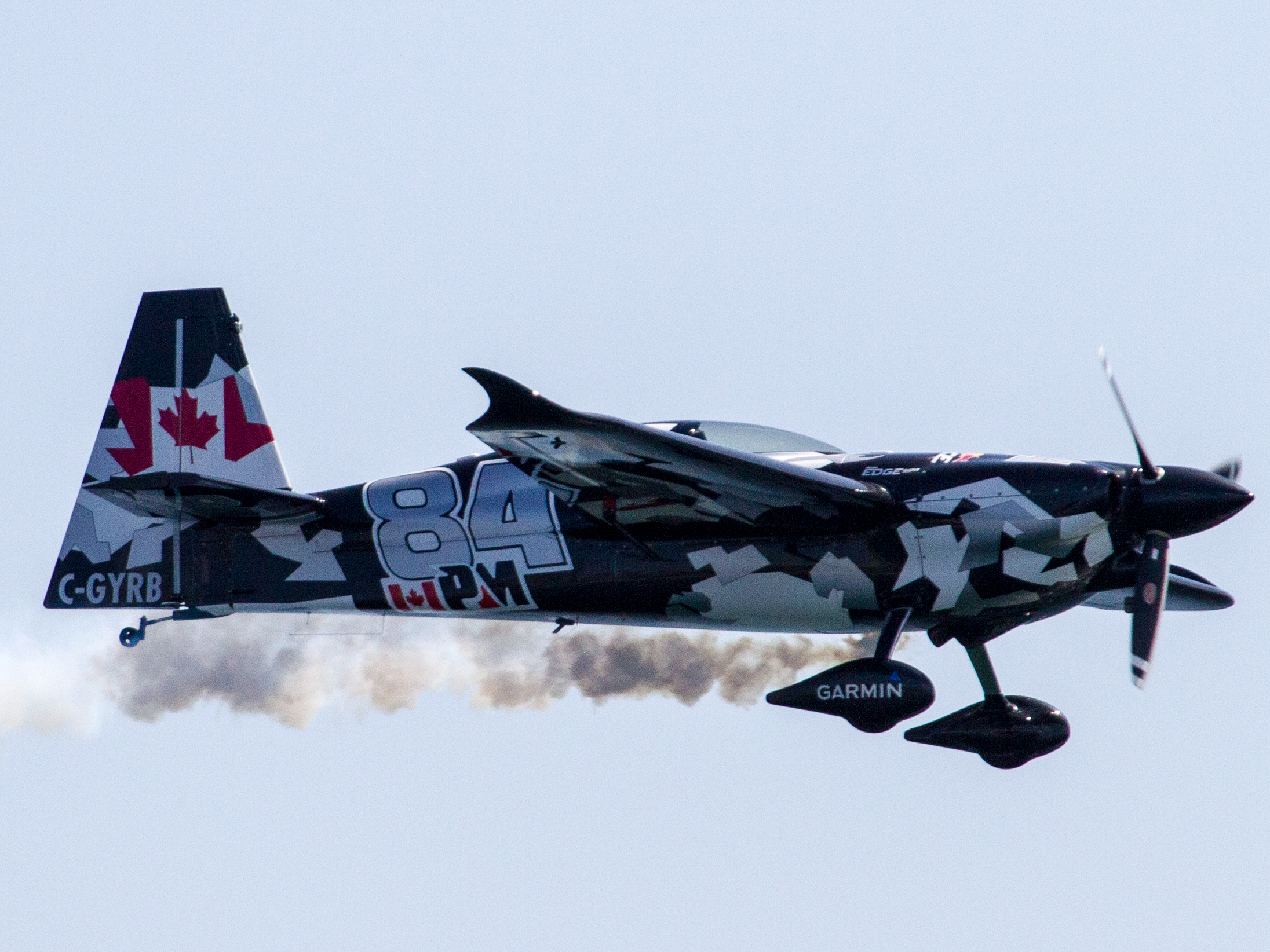
2017 Red Bull Air Race of Chiba - C-GYRB

Pete McLeod (born February 23, 1984, in Kapuskasing, Ontario) is a Canadian professional aerobatic pilot whose first competitive flight was in the Red Bull Air Race World Championship in 2009.

== Biography ==
Raised in Red Lake, a small town in Northwestern Ontario, McLeod grew up hunting, fishing, snowmobiling, boating, flying, and playing hockey. He took his first flight in the family plane when he was 6 weeks old. McLeod's mother, Margaret, recalls that when he was six McLeod would sit on his father Dave's lap during flights, hands on the control column. He learned to fly float and ski planes, undergoing flight training at Harv's Air Service in Steinbach, Manitoba and qualifying for his private pilot's licence at 16. He built up his flying hours over the next couple of years, earning his commercial licence and float endorsement when he was 18. McLeod spent the summers flying fishermen to remote outpost camps.

He earned his aerobatic flight instructor rating when he was 18, and began flying competition aerobatics in a Pitts Special in 2003. He was undefeated in his first full competitive season in 2004, winning multiple awards in his class, a United States Regional Series Championship, and the 2004 North American Collegiate Aerobatic Championship.

After completing his Economics degree at the University of Western Ontario, he decided at the start of the 2006 season to join the air show circuit and focus all his energy on professional aerobatics. He finished the season with a second place advanced category finish at the United States National Aerobatic Championships. In 2007 he earned his unrestricted surface level aerobatic waiver, one of the youngest pilots in the world to hold such a waiver for high performance aerobatics.

== Red Bull Air Race pilot ==
McLeod's 12th-place finish at the European Aerobatic Championships in the Czech Republic in 2008 earned him an invitation to attend the Red Bull Air Race qualification camp in Casarrubios, Spain, at the end of September 2008. Of the six pilots invited, five qualified for the 'super' licence required to compete in the world championship and McLeod was one of four rookies selected for active race status.

He joined the Red Bull Air Race World Championship in 2009, the youngest rookie ever to qualify for the Red Bull Air Race and the first Canadian. Prior to the start of the 2009 season, McLeod assembled a team of technicians and support staff for his first year on the circuit. He modified his new Zivko Edge 540 350 horsepower aerobatic airplane into a high performance racer.

McLeod's goal was to become a strong presence in the top 5 pilots in his second and third seasons. "I would like to become world champion by the time I'm 30 years old", said McLeod. "The setup is not going to be 100% for at least a year because it's not just the pilot but the team that's also learning. You don't need the fastest airplane in the track in your first year because there's so much to learn", he said.

== Achievements ==
=== 2003 ===
- 1st place, Ontario Open Aerobatic Championship (first competitive event)
- Completion of Emergency Maneuver Training course

=== 2004 ===
- North American Collegiate Aerobatic Champion
- Mid-America Series Champion
- Undefeated in 2004 with five 1st Place finishes
- Four time winner of the Highest Scoring Pitts Award
- Posted highest percentage point average in North America – 90.67%

=== 2006 ===
- 2nd place Advanced Category, U.S. National Aerobatic Championships
- B.F. Goodrich Award recipient at the U.S. National Championships
- Youngest Canadian air show performer
- Seven 1st place and two 2nd place career finishes (9 career competition events to date)

=== 2007 ===
- Unrestricted Surface Level (0 ft) Aerobatic Display Waiver

=== 2008 ===
- 12th Place – European Aerobatic Championship
- Announced: 2009 Red Bull Air Race World Championship Rookie
- Red Bull Air Race Super License Holder

=== 2009 ===
- 15th place overall, Red Bull Air Race World Championship
  - 15th Place – Red Bull Air Race – Abu Dhabi (UEA) – 0 points
  - 15th Place – Red Bull Air Race – San Diego (USA) – 0 points
  - 11th Place – Red Bull Air Race – Windsor, ON (Canada) – 1 point
  - 13th Place – Red Bull Air Race – Budapest (HUN) – 0 points
  - 14th Place – Red Bull Air Race – Porto (POR) – 0 points
  - 12th Place – Red Bull Air Race – Barcelona (Spain) – 0 points

=== 2010 ===
- 5th place overall, Red Bull Air Race World Championship
  - 5th Place – Red Bull Air Race – Abu Dhabi (UEA) – 7 points
  - 5th Place – Red Bull Air Race – Perth (Australia) – 7 points
  - 7th Place – Red Bull Air Race – Rio de Janeiro (Brazil) – 5 Points
  - 9th Place – Red Bull Air Race – Windsor (Canada) – 3 Points
  - 5th Place – Red Bull Air Race – New York City (USA) – 7 Points
  - 8th Place – Red Bull Air Race – Lausitz (Germany) – 4 points

=== 2011 ===
McLeod performed air shows across Canada in his Edge 540 aircraft during the summer of 2011.

=== 2012 ===
McLeod performed at 15 air shows across Canada in his Edge 540 aircraft during the summer of 2012.

=== 2014 ===
- 5th place overall, Red Bull Air Race World Championship
  - 3rd Place – Red Bull Air Race – Abu Dhabi (UEA) – 7 Points
  - 4th Place – Red Bull Air Race – Rovinj (Croatia) – 5 Points
  - 4th Place – Red Bull Air Race – Putrajaya (Malaysia) – 5 Points
  - 8th Place – Red Bull Air Race – Gdynia (Poland) – 1 Point
  - 11th Place – Red Bull Air Race – Ascot (UK) – 0 Points
  - 3rd Place – Red Bull Air Race – Dallas / Fort Worth (USA) – 7 Points
  - 1st Place – Red Bull Air Race – Las Vegas (USA) – 12 Points
  - 8th Place – Red Bull Air Race – Spielberg (Austria) – 1 Point

=== Red Bull Air Race World Championship ===
==== 2009-2010 ====
Year	1	2	3	4	5	6	7	8	Points	Wins	Rank
2009	(United Arab Emirates); 15th	(United States); 15th	(Canada); 11th	(Hungary); 13th	(Portugal); 14th	(Spain); 12th			1	0	15th
2010	(United Arab Emirates); 5th	(Australia); 5th	(Brazil); 7th	(Canada); 9th	(United States); 5th	(Germany); 8th	(Hungary); CAN	(Portugal); CAN	33	0	5th
Series not held between 2011 and 2013

==== 2014- ====
Year	1	2	3	4	5	6	7	8	Points	Wins	Rank
2014	(United Arab Emirates); 3rd	(Croatia); 4th	(Malaysia); 4th	(Poland); 8th	(United Kingdom); 11th	(United States); 3rd	(United States); 1st	(Australia); 8th	38	1	5th
2015	(United Arab Emirates); 3rd	(Japan); 12th	(Croatia); 7th	(Hungary); 4th	(United Kingdom); 13th	(Austria); 5th	(United States); 8th	(United States); 11th	19	0	8th
2016	(United Arab Emirates); 6th	(Austria); 4th	(Japan); 12th	(Hungary); 9th	(United Kingdom); 13th	(Germany); 3rd	(United States); 3rd	(United States); CAN	30.5	0	9th
2017	(United Arab Emirates); 3rd	(United States); 10th	(Japan); 7th	(Hungary); 2nd	(Russia); 2nd	(Portugal); 2nd	(Germany); 5th	(United States); 11th	56	0	3rd
2018	(United Arab Emirates); 14th	(France); 7th	(Japan); 4th	(Hungary); 12th	(Russia); 11th	(Austria); 7th	(United States); 2nd	(United States); 11th	27	0	8th
2019	(United Arab Emirates); 14th	9th	10th	4th					48	0	6th

Legend:

- CAN: Cancelled
- DNP: Did not participate
- DNS: Did not show
- DQ: Disqualified
- NC: Not classified

== See also ==
- Competition aerobatics
- FAI
