= 2015 Red Bull Air Race World Championship =

Seasons
- ← 2014 2016 →

The 2015 Red Bull Air Race World Championship was the tenth Red Bull Air Race World Championship series, contested over eight events in seven countries held between February and October.

British pilot Paul Bonhomme won his third world title by five points, after winning half of the eight races. His closest challenger was Australian pilot Matt Hall, and the pair finished well clear at the top of the championship. Bonhomme won the opening two races of the season in Abu Dhabi and Chiba, before an eighth-place finish – his worst result of the season – in Rovinj, saw Hall tie his points tally with three podium finishes. After Austria's Hannes Arch won in Rovinj and Budapest, Bonhomme and Hall shared the remaining victories between them; Bonhomme won at Ascot and Fort Worth, while Hall took his first Air Race victories at the Red Bull Ring and Las Vegas Motor Speedway. Arch completed the championship podium, some 42 points in arrears of Bonhomme.

The series also maintained the Challenger Cup format that was introduced for the 2014 season, for young pilots to develop their skills. Each pilot entered at least five races in order to accrue points towards the Cup rankings, with the top six pilots after the Fort Worth event being invited to a winner-takes-all event at Las Vegas Motor Speedway. Mikaël Brageot of France – who had topped the Cup rankings – won the race by 0.035 seconds over Peter Podlunšek, to take the title.

== Aircraft and pilots ==
=== Master Class ===
No.	Pilot	Aircraft	Rounds
22	(Austria) Hannes Arch	Zivko Edge 540	All
91	(Hungary) Péter Besenyei	Corvus Racer 540	1–3
91	(Hungary) Péter Besenyei	Zivko Edge 540	4–8
55	(United Kingdom) Paul Bonhomme	Zivko Edge 540	All
10	(United States) Kirby Chambliss	Zivko Edge 540	All
21	(Germany) Matthias Dolderer	Zivko Edge 540	All
99	(United States) Michael Goulian	Zivko Edge 540	All
95	(Australia) Matt Hall	MX Aircraft MXS	All
27	(France) Nicolas Ivanoff	Zivko Edge 540	All
9	(United Kingdom) Nigel Lamb	MX Aircraft MXS	All
12	(France) François Le Vot	Zivko Edge 540	All
84	(Canada) Pete McLeod	Zivko Edge 540	All
31	(Japan) Yoshihide Muroya	Zivko Edge 540	All
8	(Czech Republic) Martin Šonka	Zivko Edge 540	All
26	(Spain) Juan Velarde	Zivko Edge 540	All

Entering

- Challenger Class competitors François Le Vot and Juan Velarde, who were fourth and eighth respectively in 2014, joined the Master Class.

=== Challenger Class ===
- All Challenger Cup Pilots used an Extra 330LX.

No.	Pilot	Rounds
77	(Brazil) Francis Barros	1–3, 5–7
62	(Germany) Florian Bergér	1–2, 4–8
5	(Chile) Cristian Bolton	1–5, 7–8
11	(France) Mikaël Brageot	1, 3–4, 6–8
18	(Czech Republic) Petr Kopfstein	1–2, 4–8
37	(Slovenia) Peter Podlunšek	2–8
17	(Sweden) Daniel Ryfa	1–6, 8

== Race calendar and results ==
The eight-event calendar for the 2015 season was announced on 25 November 2014. An updated race calendar was released on 3 March 2015, which dropped the round in Sochi, Russia and the round in Rovinj, Croatia returned to the calendar.

Round	Country	Location	Date	Fastest Qualifying	Winning Pilot	Winning Aircraft	Winning Challenger	Report
1	United Arab Emirates	Abu Dhabi	13–14 February	(United Kingdom) Paul Bonhomme	(United Kingdom) Paul Bonhomme	Zivko Edge 540	(Chile) Cristian Bolton	report
2	Japan	Makuhari, Chiba	16–17 May	(France) Nicolas Ivanoff	(United Kingdom) Paul Bonhomme	Zivko Edge 540	(Czech Republic) Petr Kopfstein	report
3	Croatia	Rovinj	30–31 May	(United Kingdom) Paul Bonhomme	(Austria) Hannes Arch	Zivko Edge 540	(Sweden) Daniel Ryfa	report
4	Hungary	Budapest	4–5 July	(Australia) Matt Hall	(Austria) Hannes Arch	Zivko Edge 540	(Sweden) Daniel Ryfa	report
5	United Kingdom	Ascot Racecourse, Ascot	15–16 August	(United Kingdom) Paul Bonhomme	(United Kingdom) Paul Bonhomme	Zivko Edge 540	(Czech Republic) Petr Kopfstein	report
6	Austria	Red Bull Ring, Spielberg	5–6 September	cancelled	(Australia) Matt Hall	MX Aircraft MXS	(France) Mikaël Brageot	report
7	United States	Texas Motor Speedway, Fort Worth	26–27 September	(Germany) Matthias Dolderer	(United Kingdom) Paul Bonhomme	Zivko Edge 540	(France) Mikaël Brageot	report
8	United States	Las Vegas Motor Speedway, Las Vegas	17–18 October	(Japan) Yoshihide Muroya	(Australia) Matt Hall	MX Aircraft MXS	(France) Mikaël Brageot	report

== Championship standings ==
=== Master Class ===
Master Class scoring system

Position	**1st**	**2nd**	**3rd**	**4th**	**5th**	**6th**	**7th**	**8th**	**9–14th**
Points	12	9	7	5	4	3	2	1	0

Pos.	Pilot	ABU (United Arab Emirates)	CHI (Japan)	ROV (Croatia)	BUD (Hungary)	ASC (United Kingdom)	SPE (Austria)	FTW (United States)	LVG (United States)	Points
1	(United Kingdom) Paul Bonhomme	**1**	1	**8**	2	**1**	2	1	2	76
2	(Australia) Matt Hall	2	2	3	**5**	2	1	2	1	71
3	(Austria) Hannes Arch	4	11	1	1	8	13	10	5	34
4	(Czech Republic) Martin Šonka	10	10	2	3	7	4	4	8	29
5	(Germany) Matthias Dolderer	9	3	6	7	10	6	**5**	3	26
6	(Japan) Yoshihide Muroya	6	8	10	9	3	10	3	**4**	23
7	(United Kingdom) Nigel Lamb	5	5	5	8	5	12	6	10	20
8	(Canada) Pete McLeod	3	12	7	4	13	5	8	11	19
9	(France) Nicolas Ivanoff	8	**4**	9	14	4	9	7	7	15
10	(United States) Michael Goulian	12	6	4	11	9	7	9	6	13
11	(United States) Kirby Chambliss	DNS	7	11	10	12	3	11	12	9
12	(Hungary) Péter Besenyei	7	13	12	6	6	8	12	13	9
13	(Spain) Juan Velarde	13	9	13	13	11	11	13	9	0
14	(France) François Le Vot	11	14	14	12	14	DSQ	14	14	0
Pos.	Pilot	ABU (United Arab Emirates)	CHI (Japan)	ROV (Croatia)	BUD (Hungary)	ASC (United Kingdom)	SPE (Austria)	FTW (United States)	LVG (United States)	Points

Colour	Result
Gold	Winner
Silver	Second place
Bronze	Third place
Green	Points classification
Blue	Non-points classification
Blue	Non-classified finish (NC)
Purple	Retired, not classified (Ret)
Red	Did not qualify (DNQ)
Red	Did not pre-qualify (DNPQ)
Black	Disqualified (DSQ)
White	Did not start (DNS)
White	Withdrew (WD)
White	Race cancelled (C)
Blank	Did not practice (DNP)
Blank	Did not arrive (DNA)
Blank	Excluded (EX)

**Bold** – Fastest Qualifying Pilot

=== Challenger Class ===
As in 2014, Challenger Class pilots had to compete in at least three races throughout the season, with each pilot's best three scores counting towards the Challenger Cup ranking. The top six pilots in the ranking qualified for a winner-takes-all race at the end of the season.

Challenger Class scoring system

Position	**1st**	**2nd**	**3rd**	**4th**	**5th**	**6th**
Points	10	8	6	4	2	0

==== Ranking ====
Pos.	Pilot	ABU (United Arab Emirates)	CHI (Japan)	ROV (Croatia)	BUD (Hungary)	ASC (United Kingdom)	SPE (Austria)	FTW (United States)	Drop	Points
1	(France) Mikaël Brageot	3		2	2		1	1	14	28
2	(Sweden) Daniel Ryfa	5	2	1	1	3	3		14	28
3	(Czech Republic) Petr Kopfstein	2	1		4	1	2	6	12	28
4	(Chile) Cristian Bolton	1	3	3	5	2		4	12	24
5	(Slovenia) Peter Podlunšek		6	4	3	4	4	2	8	18
6	(Germany) Florian Bergér	4	4		6	5	5	3	4	14
7	(Brazil) Francis Barros	DSQ	5	5		6	6	5		6
Pos.	Pilot	ABU (United Arab Emirates)	CHI (Japan)	ROV (Croatia)	BUD (Hungary)	ASC (United Kingdom)	SPE (Austria)	FTW (United States)	Drop	Points

==== Final ====
At the last race of the season at Las Vegas, the top six pilots in the standings took part in a race to determine the final ranking of the Challenger Cup.

Rank	Pilots	Time
1	(France) Mikaël Brageot	1:00.521
2	(Slovenia) Peter Podlunšek	1:00.556
3	(Chile) Cristian Bolton	1:00.920
4	(Czech Republic) Petr Kopfstein	1:02.117
5	(Germany) Florian Bergér	1:02.255
6	(Sweden) Daniel Ryfa	1:02.459
