= Cristian Bolton =

Chilean air racer

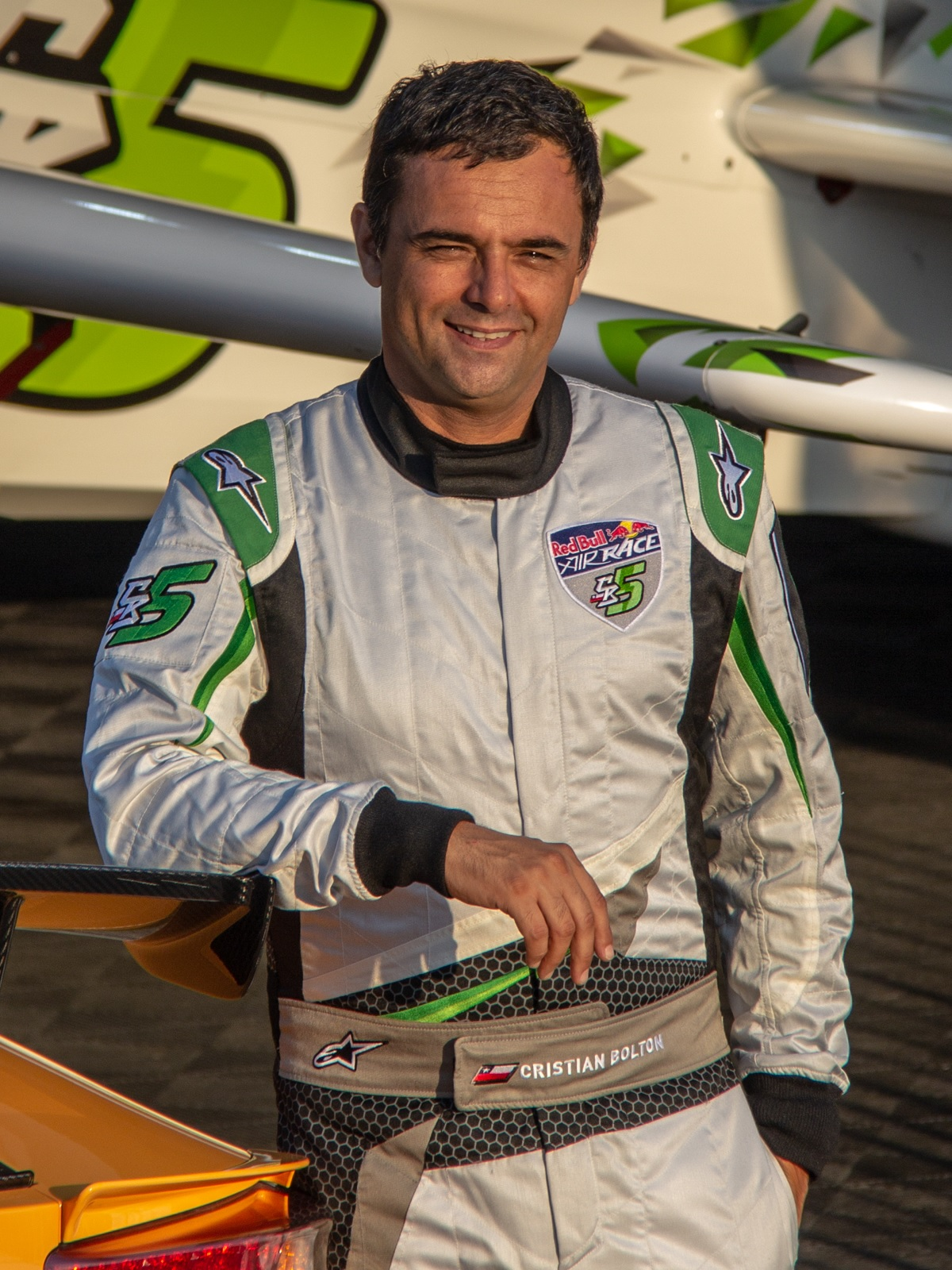
- Born: 10 October 1973 (age 52); Puerto Montt, Chile
- Aviation career
- Air force: Chilean Air Force

Racing career
- First race: Challenger: Abu Dhabi 2014; Master: Indianapolis 2016
- Best position: 15th (2016)
- Aircraft: Zivko Edge 540
- Website: cristianbolton.com

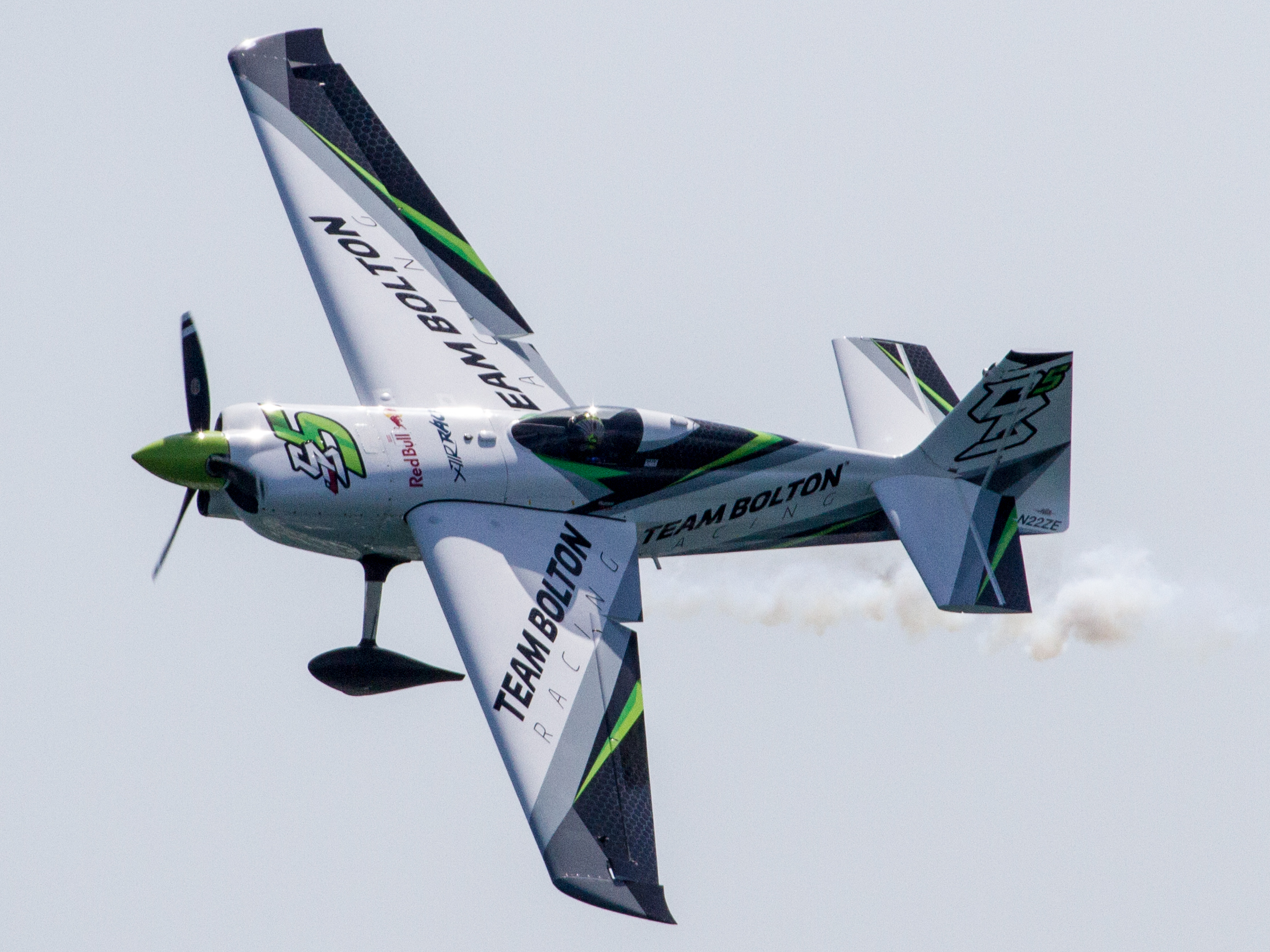
2017 Red Bull Air Race of Chiba - N22ZE

Lieutenant Colonel Cristian A. Bolton (born 10 October 1973) is a Chilean aviator and former fighter pilot in the Chilean Air Force. He was a competitor and instructor in aerobatics, most notably in the Red Bull Air Race. He is Latin America's leading aerobatic pilot.

Commander Bolton was the leader of the chilean FACH Halcones Acrobatic Team during the years 2013-14.

== Results ==
=== Red Bull Air Race ===
Year	Class	Aircraft	1	2	3	4	5	6	7	8	Position	Points
2014	Challenger	Extra 330LX	ABU; DNP	ROV; DNP	PUT; DNP	GDY; 6	ASC; 6	FTW; 2	LVG; DNP		10th	8
2015	Challenger	Extra 330LX	ABU; 1	CHI; 3	ROV; 3	BUD; 5	ASC; 2	SPI; DNP	FTW; 4		4th	24
2016	Challenger	Extra 330LX	ABU; DNP	SPE; 4	CHI; 1	BUD; 6	ASC; 3	LAU; DNP			5th	20
2016	Master	Zivko Edge 540							IND; 13	LVG; CAN	15th	0
2017	Master	Zivko Edge 540	ABU; 7	SDE; 11	CHI; 14	BUD; 11	KAZ; 8	POR; 12	LAU; 11	IND; 9	13th	9
2018	Master	Zivko Edge 540	ABU; 12	CEQ; 13	CHI; 10	BUD; 6	KAZ; 14	WIN; 14	IND; 5	FTW; 14	14th	12
