= Peter Podlunšek =

Slovenian air racer

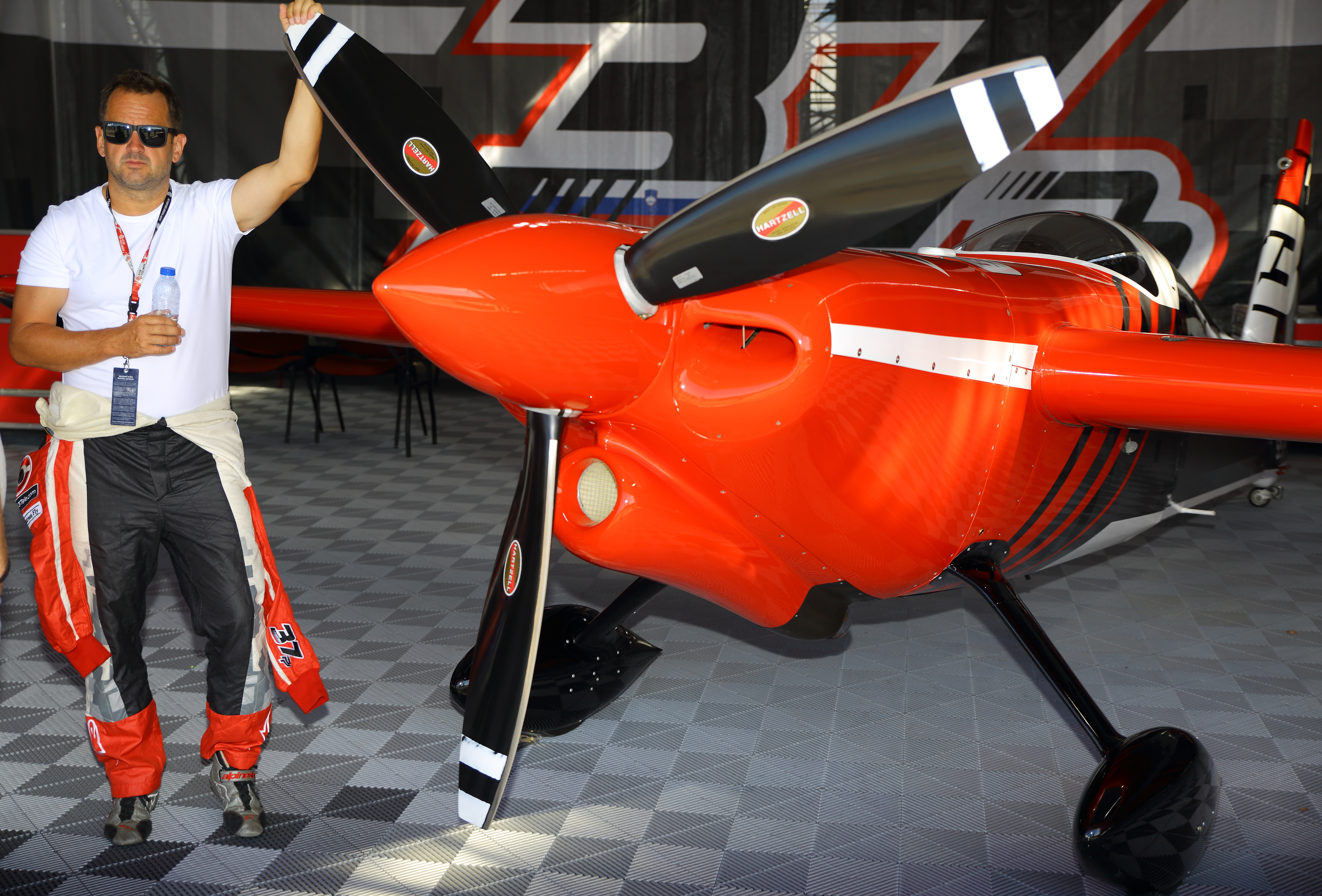
- Born: May 25, 1970 (age 56); Trbovlje, Central Sava
- Website: redbullairrace.com

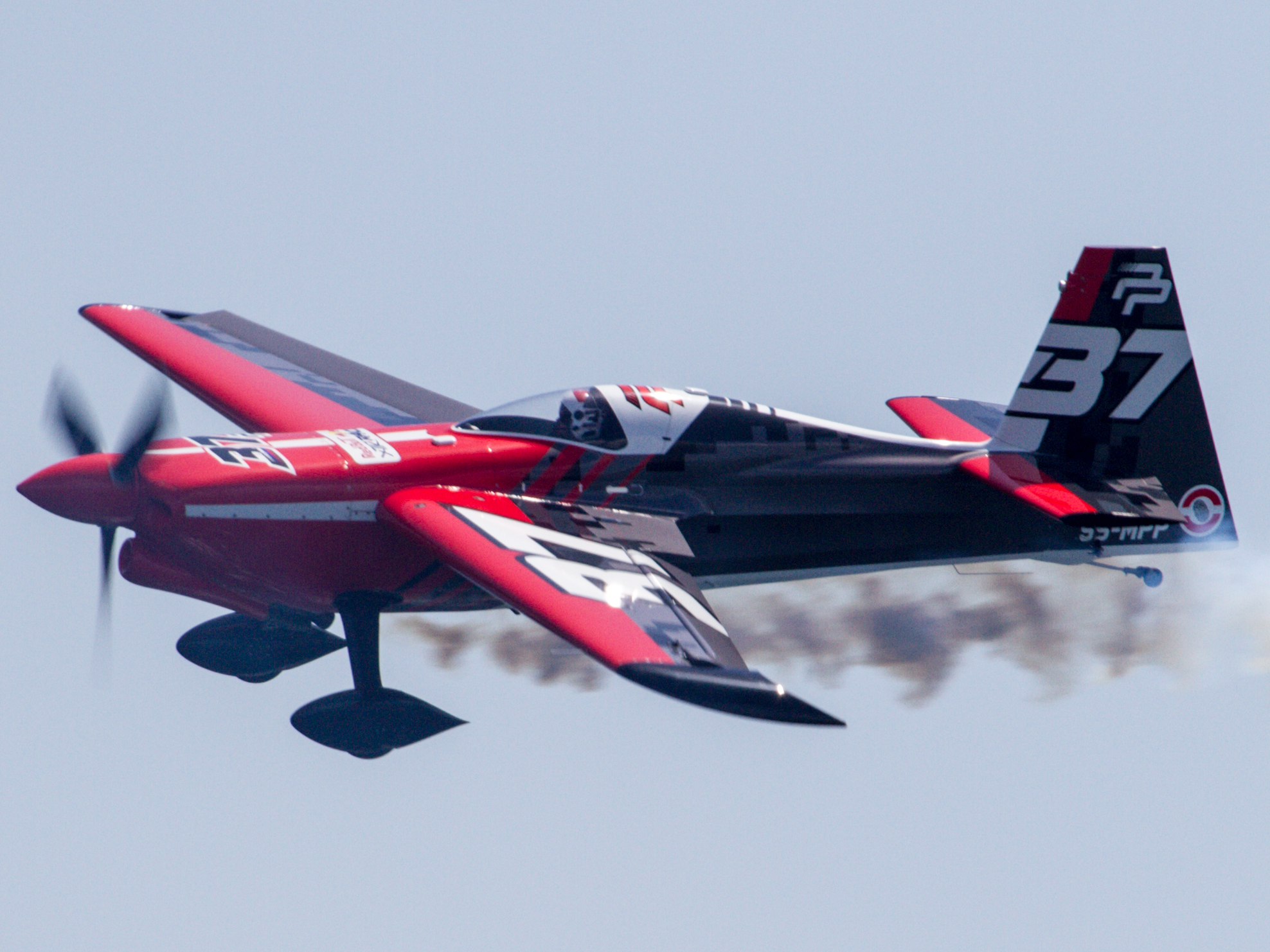
2017 Red Bull Air Race of Chiba - S5-MPP

Peter Podlunšek (born May 25, 1970) is a Slovenian aerobatics pilot.

He competes in the Red Bull Air Race World Championship Challenger Cup competition. His first Red Bull Air Race was on 12 April 2014 in Rovinj where he took third place. He uses two racing aircraft; an Extra 300L and an Extra 330SC. He has flown aerobatic aircraft since 1994 and has won eight national championships in aerobatics. He is based in Slovenia's aerobatics hotbed of Murska Sobota. Since 2008 he has been flying the Extra 330SC and participated in more than 250 airshows across Europe, China and Libya. In his two decades of flying he has clocked more than 1,000 flight hours - 450 of those being in aerobatics. Peter announced that he will retire the master class pilot of Red Bull Air Race in the 2017 season.

== Red Bull Air Race ==
=== Challenger Class ===
(Slovenia) Peter Podlunšek at the Red Bull Air Race World Championship
Year	1	2	3	4	5	6	7	8	Points	Wins	Rank
2014	(United Arab Emirates); DNP	(Croatia); 3rd 6	(Malaysia); 5th 2	(Poland); DNP	(United Kingdom); 5th 2	(United States); 4th 4	(United States); DNP	(Austria); DNP	12	0	9th
2015	(United Arab Emirates); DNP	(Japan); 6th 0	(Croatia); 4th 4	(Hungary); 3rd 6	(United Kingdom); 4th 4	(Austria); 4th 4	(United States); 2nd 8	(United States); 2nd	18	0	2nd

=== Master Class ===
Year	1	2	3	4	5	6	7	8	Points	Wins	Rank
2016	(United Arab Emirates); Abu Dhabi; 13th	(Austria); Spielberg; 8th	(Japan); Chiba; 11th	(Hungary); Budapest; 12th	(United Kingdom); Ascot; 10th	(Germany); Lausitz; 13th	(United States); Indianapolis; 11th	(United States); Las Vegas; CAN	4	0	13th
2017	(United Arab Emirates) Abu Dhabi; DSQ	(United States); San Diego; 2nd	(Japan); Chiba; 12th	(Hungary); Budapest; 13th(DNS)	(Russia); Kazan; 14th	(Portugal); Porto; 9th	(Germany); Lausitz; 13th	(United States); Indianapolis; 14th	14	0	12th

*season in progress Legend:

- CAN - cancelled
- DNP - did not participate
- DNS - did not show
- DQ - disqualified
- NC - not classified

== See also ==
- Competition aerobatics
