= Daniel Ryfa =

Swedish pilot (born 1979)

- Born: December 17, 1979 (age 46); Stockholm
- Website: danielryfa.com

Daniel Ryfa (born December 17, 1979) is a Swedish pilot. He is a pilot of the Challenger class of the Red Bull Air Race World Championship.

== Biography ==
Ryfa was born in Stockholm, Sweden in 1979.

Daniel Ryfa is the winner of 6th FAI European Advanced Aerobatic Championship 2009. Most successful Scandinavian aerobatic pilot in times.

In 2014, he joined the Red Bull Air Race as Challenger class pilot. Race seasons 2014–2019 with most podiums in the challenger class (22 podiums / 8 race winns).

He maneuvers planes such as Pitts Special, Edge 540, Extra 330LX, Sukhoi Su-26, Royal Aircraft Factory S.E.5 and Piper Cub L-4 J Grasshopper.

== Results ==
=== Red Bull Air Race ===
==== Challenger Class ====
Year	1	2	3	4	5	6	7	8	Points	Wins	Position
2014	(United Arab Emirates); 2nd	(Croatia); DNP	(Malaysia); 3rd	(Poland); 2nd	(United Kingdom); DNP	(United States); 3rd	(United States); DNP	(Austria); 5th	22	0	2nd
2015	(United Arab Emirates); 5th	(Japan); 2nd	(Croatia); 1st	(Hungary); 1st	(United Kingdom); 3rd	(Austria); 3rd	(United States); DNP	(United States); 6th	28	2	2nd
2016	(United Arab Emirates); 1st	(Austria); 3rd	(Japan); DNP	(Hungary); 1st	(United Kingdom); 5th	(Germany); 4th	(United States); DNP	(United States); CAN	26	2	2nd
2017	(United Arab Emirates); 1st	(United States); DNP	(Hungary); 3rd	(Russia); 2nd	(Russia); 6th	(Portugal); DNP	(Germany); 1st	(United States); 6th	38	2	2nd
2018	(United Arab Emirates); 5th	(France); 1st	(Hungary); DNP	(Russia); DNP	(Austria); 2nd	(Austria); 6th	(United States); DNP	(United States); 5th	22	1	6th

Legend: * CAN: Cancelled * DNP: Did not take part * DNS: Did not start * DSQ: Disqualified
