= Péter Besenyei =

Hungarian air racer

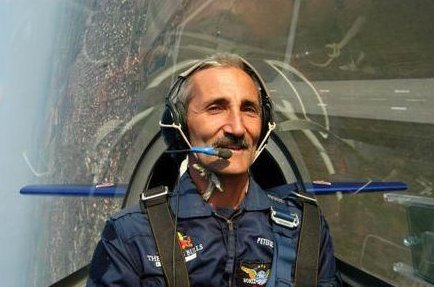
- Born: 8 June 1956 (age 70)
- Aviation career

Racing career
- First race: 2003
- Best position: 1st (2003)
- Aircraft: Corvus Racer 540
- Website: besenyeipeter.hu

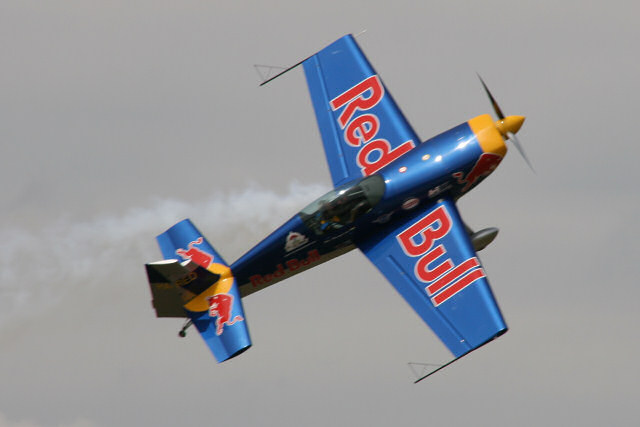
Péter Besenyei piloting Extra 300S

Péter Besenyei (born 1956) is a Hungarian aerobatics pilot and world champion air racer.

== Biography ==
He was born on 8 June 1956 in Körmend, Hungary. He lived near the airport of Budapest and became interested in flying when he was a child. From watching 1962 World Aerobatic Championships he decided to become a pilot. At 15 years of age he flew a glider for the first time. In 1976 Péter entered his first flying competition by piloting a glider and showed his talent, finishing in second place.

Besenyei became an aerobatics pilot and won several titles in national and international championships. He won his first gold medal in 1982 at the Austrian National Championships. His specialty is free-style aerobatics. He invented a number of original snap rolls and, in 1984, the "knife-edge spin". In 1995 Péter Besenyei won 2 gold and 2 silver medals and he was named the most successful aerobatics pilot of his time. In 2001 Besenyei flew upside down under the Széchenyi Chain Bridge, that spans the river Danube in Budapest, a maneuver that became a standard in air races today.

Besenyei is sometimes referred to as the godfather of the Red Bull Air Race World Championship because of his work helping develop it. He was asked, in 2001 by Austrian energy-drink company Red Bull, to help develop the concept of an air racing competition. With enthusiasm he helped set up the rules and regulations and carefully selected the most daring pilots, with skills and courage, to handle the extreme physical and mental challenges of the air race. The first race was held in 2003 in Zeltweg, Austria. After two years the competition became a worldwide organization of Red Bull Air Race World Series.

He is currently a test pilot for the Hungarian Aviation Office and a flying instructor for aerobatic pilots on Zivko Edge 540. Péter enjoys car racing, skiing, sky diving, fishing, and photography. Besenyei retired from the Red Bull Air Race at the completion of the 2015 season.

== Achievements ==
1982

- Austrian National Championships – overall winner

1990

- World Aerobatics Championships – 2nd

1993

- Breitling Aerobatics World Cup - 3rd

1994

- World Champion of the Compulsory Program

1995

- European Champion Freestyle
- European Champion of the Compulsory Program

1998

- FAI World Grand Prix Series 1st

2000

- World Champion Freestyle

2001

- FAI World Grand Prix Series 1st

2003

- Tokyo, Japan - 1st

2005

- FAI World Series Grand Prix, Lausanne, Switzerland - 1st

== Honors ==
- 1996 - "Gold Medal of the President of the Republic of Hungary" by President Árpád Göncz

(Hungary) Péter Besenyei at the Red Bull Air Race World Series
Year	1	2	3	4	5	6	7	8	9	10	11	12	Points	Wins	Rank
2003	(Austria); 1st	(Hungary); 1st											6	2	1st
2004	(United Kingdom); 3rd	(Hungary); 3rd	(United States); 3rd										12	0	2nd
2005	(United Arab Emirates); 1st	(Netherlands); 2nd	(Austria); 2nd	(Republic of Ireland); 1st	(United Kingdom); 3rd	(Hungary); 4th	(United States); 4th						32	2	2nd
2006	(United Arab Emirates); 3rd	(Spain); 1st	(Germany); 2nd	(Russia); CAN	(Turkey); 3rd	(Hungary); DSQ	(United Kingdom); 2nd	(United States); 2nd	(Australia); 1st				35	2	2nd
2007	(United Arab Emirates); 1st	(Brazil); 5th	(United States); 1st	(Turkey); 5th	(Spain); CAN	(Switzerland); 3rd	(United Kingdom); 3rd	(Hungary); 4th	(Portugal); 4th	(United States); 6th	(Mexico); CAN	(Australia); 7th	31	2	3rd
2008	(United Arab Emirates); 4th	(United States); 8th	(United States); 5th	(Sweden); CAN	(Netherlands); 6th	(United Kingdom); 4th	(Hungary); 5th	(Portugal); 7th	(Spain); CAN	(Australia); 7th			34	0	5th
2009	(United Arab Emirates); 10th	(United States); 4th	(Canada); DNS	(Hungary); 10th	(Portugal); 4th	(Spain); 8th							24	0	8th
2010	(United Arab Emirates); 3rd	(Australia); 10th	(Brazil); 11th	(Canada); 10th	(United States); 8th	(Germany); 9th	(Hungary); CAN	(Portugal); CAN					21	0	10th
2014	(United Arab Emirates); 10th	(Croatia); 11th	(Malaysia); 7th	(Poland); 7th	(United Kingdom); 7th	(United States); 12th	(United States); 12th	(Austria); 12th					6	0	11th
2015	(United Arab Emirates); 7th	(Japan); 13th	(Croatia); 12th	(Hungary); 6th	(United Kingdom); 6th	(Austria); 8th	(United States); 12th	(United States); 13th					9	0	12th

Legend:

- CAN: Cancelled
- DNP: Did not participate
- DNS: Did not start
- DSQ: Disqualified
- NC: Not classified

== See also ==
- Jurgis Kairys
- Competition aerobatics

Sporting positions
Preceded by none	Red Bull Air Race World Series Champion; 2003	Succeeded by Kirby Chambliss
