= Zivko Edge 540 =

Racing aircraft in the US

Edge 540
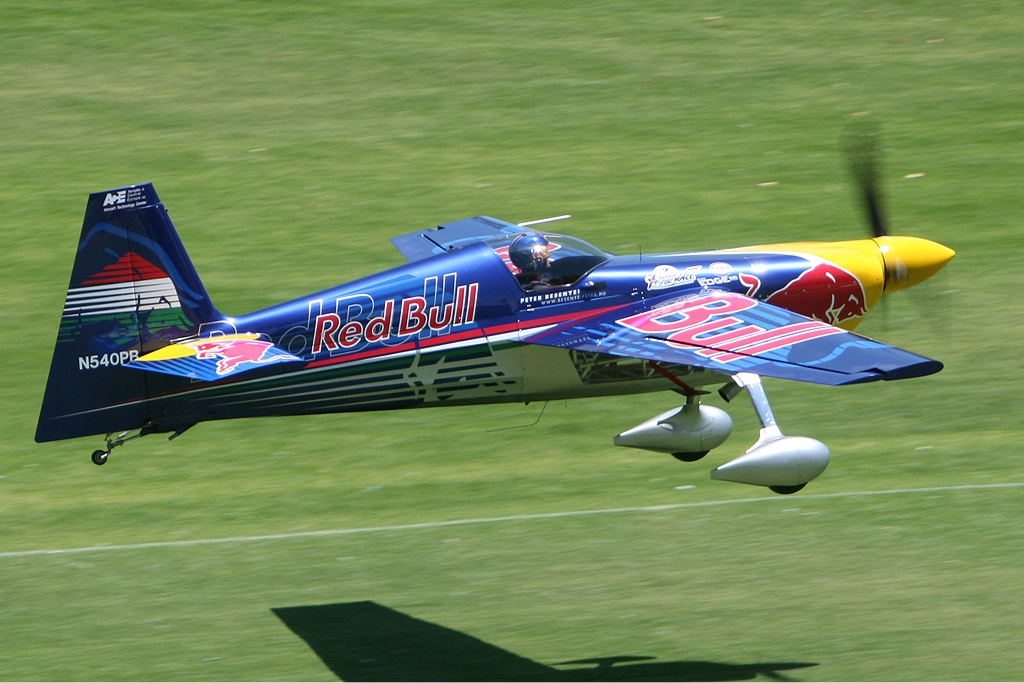
- Zivko Edge 540 flying across Langley Park in Perth, Western Australia

General information
- Type: Competition aerobatic and racing aircraft
- National origin: United States
- Manufacturer: Zivko Aeronautics

History
- First flight: 1996

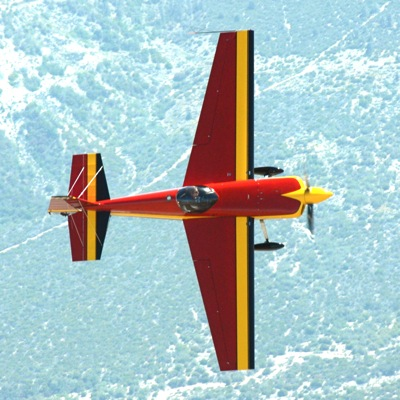
An early version of the Edge 540 with a wire-braced tail

The Zivko Edge 540 manufactured by Zivko Aeronautics is a highly aerobatic aircraft. Capable of a 420 degree per second roll rate and a 3,700 foot per minute climb rate, it has been flown to victory on the international Unlimited aerobatics circuit several times since the mid-1990s. A tandem-seat version is sold as the Edge 540T.

The Zivko Edge 540 is the most common aircraft used in the Red Bull Air Race World Series.

== Specifications (Edge 540) ==
Data from Edge 540 Aerobatic Aircraft

General characteristics

- Crew: 1 (540T 2)
- Length: 20 ft 7 in (6.27 m)

23 ft (7 m) 540T

- Wingspan: 24 ft 4 in (7.42 m)

25 ft 10 in (8 m) 540T

- Height: 7 ft 9 in (2.36 m)
- Wing area: 98 sq ft (9.1 m^{2})

106 sq ft (10 m^{2}) 540T

- Airfoil: John Roncz symmetrical
- Empty weight: 1,170 lb (531 kg)

1,319 lb (598 kg) 540T

- Max takeoff weight: 1,800 lb (816 kg)

1,950 lb (885 kg) 540T

- Maximum aerobatic weight: 1,550 lb (703 kg)

1,600 lb (726 kg) 540T

- Fuel capacity: AVGAS 100LL 61.5 US gal (51.2 imp gal; 233 L) total (17.5 US gal (14.6 imp gal; 66 L) fuselage + 22 US gal (18 imp gal; 83 L) in each wing)
- Powerplant: 1 × Lycoming AEIO-540-EXP (modified) 6-cylinder air-cooled horizontally-opposed piston engine, 310 hp (230 kW) at 2700 rpm - rated power

327 hp (244 kW) 540T

- Propellers: 3-bladed Hartzell HC-C3YR-4AX composite constant-speed propeller

Performance

- Stall speed: 51 kn (59 mph, 94 km/h) (V_{SO}) at 1,550 lb (703 kg)

59 kn (68 mph; 109 km/h) at 1,950 lb (885 kg) 540T

- Never exceed speed: 230 kn (260 mph, 430 km/h)
- Max aerobatic airspeed (V_{a}): 170 kn (200 mph; 310 km/h)
- g limits: ±12

±8 540T dual
±10 540T solo

- Roll rate: 420°/sec
- Rate of climb: 3,700 ft/min (19 m/s)
- Wing loading: 12.4 lb/sq ft (61 kg/m^{2}) empty 540T

== See also ==
Aircraft of comparable role, configuration, and era

- Corvus Racer 540
- Extra EA-300
- Mudry CAP 230
- MX Aircraft MXS
- Sukhoi Su-26
- Sukhoi Su-31
- XtremeAir Sbach 300 (XA41)
