= Nigel Lamb =

English aerobatics pilot (born 1956)

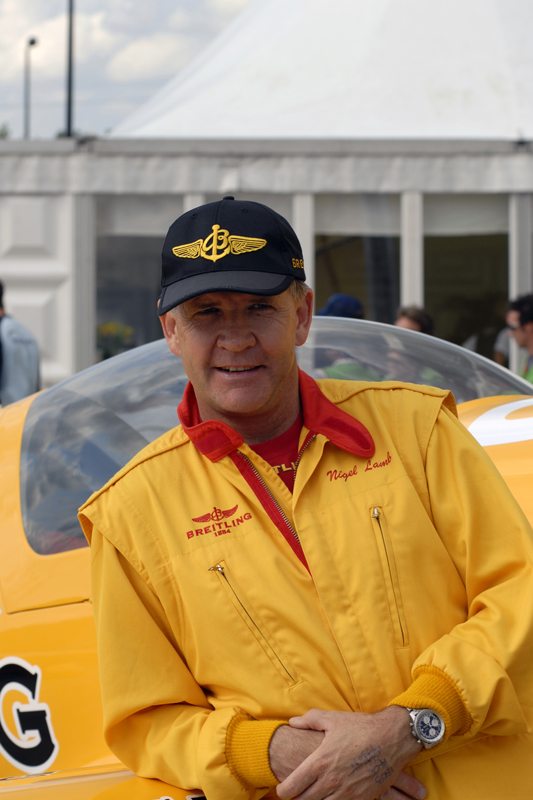
- Lamb in 2007
- Born: 17 August 1956 (age 70); Eastern Highlands, Southern Rhodesia
- Aviation career

Racing career
- First race: 2005
- Best position: 1st (2014)
- Aircraft: MXS-R
- Website: nigellamb.com

Nigel Lamb (born 17 August 1956) is an English aerobatics pilot and the 2014 Red Bull Air Race World Champion.

== Early life ==
Lamb was born in the Eastern Highlands of Southern Rhodesia and was inspired to fly by his father, a Royal Air Force fighter pilot iduringWorld War II. Lamb first applied to join the Rhodesian Air Force at 11, and persisted until he was finally accepted at 18, in 1975, having finished his schooling at Umtali Boy's High School.

== Career ==
After gaining his wings he did an Operational Conversion on de Havilland Vampire jets before becoming a helicopter pilot, flying the Alouette II and Alouette III and Augusta Bell UH-1H in the Rhodesian Bush War. In 1980, following the election of Robert Mugabe, Lamb, by then an instructor, left the Air Force and moved to England to join the Marlboro Aerobatic team. He was a professional display pilot for 36 years, flew 1,900 public displays in over 30 countries worldwide including leading the first civilian aerobatics display team to fly in China in 1996. Nigel was the British Unlimited Aerobatic Champion 8 times consecutively and spent eight years putting his skills to the test in the highly challenging Red Bull Air Race World Championship, winning the 2014 world championship title.

He also featured in some major movie productions as an aerial display pilot flying a variety of historical aircraft including a Spitfire, P-51 Mustang and a P-40 Kittyhawk.

== Personal life ==
Nigel Lamb is married to successful aerobatic pilot Hilary, and together they have three sons, Max, Daniel and Ben. He enjoys skiing, scuba diving and squash.

=== 2005–2010 ===
(United Kingdom) Nigel Lamb at the Red Bull Air Race World Championship
Year	1	2	3	4	5	6	7	8	9	10	11	12	Points	Wins	Rank
2005	(United Arab Emirates); DNP	(Netherlands); DNP	(Austria); DNP	(Republic of Ireland); DNP	(United Kingdom); 9th	(Hungary); 8th	(United States); 7th						0	0	8th
2006	(United Arab Emirates); 9th	(Spain); 6th	(Germany); 8th	(Russia); CAN	(Turkey); 6th	(Hungary); DQ	(United Kingdom); 6th	(United States); 8th	(Australia); 8th				3	0	9th
2007	(United Arab Emirates); 11th	(Brazil); 7th	(United States); 8th	(Turkey); 8th	(Spain); CAN	(Switzerland); 10th	(United Kingdom); 7th	(Hungary); 6th	(Portugal); 7th	(United States); 3rd	(Mexico); CAN	(Australia); 8th	5	0	9th
2008	(United Arab Emirates); 8th	(United States); 6th	(United States); 12th	(Sweden); CAN	(Netherlands); 8th	(United Kingdom); 5th	(Hungary); 6th	(Portugal); 5th	(Spain); CAN	(Australia); 2nd			30	0	7th
2009	(United Arab Emirates); 4th	(United States); 6th	(Canada); 8th	(Hungary); 9th	(Portugal); 11th	(Spain); 2nd							32	0	6th
2010	(United Arab Emirates); 2nd	(Australia); 4th	(Brazil); 2nd	(Canada); 4th	(United States); 2nd	(Germany); 4th	(Hungary); CAN	(Portugal); CAN					55	0	3rd
Series not held between 2011 and 2013

=== 2014–2016 ===
Year	1	2	3	4	5	6	7	8	Points	Wins	Rank
2014	(United Arab Emirates); 5th	(Croatia); 8th	(Malaysia); 1st	(Poland); 2nd	(United Kingdom); 2nd	(United States); 2nd	(United States); 2nd	(Austria); 2nd	62	1	1st
2015	(United Arab Emirates); 5th	(Japan); 5th	(Croatia); 5th	(Hungary); 8th	(United Kingdom); 5th	(Austria); 13th	(United States); 6th	(United States); 10th	20	0	7th
2016	(United Arab Emirates); 11th	(Austria); 3rd	(Japan); 4th	(Hungary); 6th	(United Kingdom); 6th	(Germany); 10th	(United States); 2nd	(United States); CAN	37.75	0	4th

== See also ==
- Competition aerobatics

== Sources ==
- Dunnell, Paul (June 2017). "Aeroplane meets Nigel Lamb". Aeroplane. Vol. 45, no. 6. pp. 90–97. ISSN 0143-7240.

Sporting positions
Preceded by Paul Bonhomme (2010)	Red Bull Air Race World Champion; 2014	Succeeded by Paul Bonhomme (2015)
