= Florian Bergér =

German pilot

- Born: 31 March 1989 (age 37)

Florian Bergér (born 31 March 1989) is a German pilot. He is a co-pilot for Lufthansa and a pilot of the Challenger class of the Red Bull Air Race World Championship.

== Biography ==
Florian Bergér is the first German ever to claim the Challenger Cup title and the only pilot to have earned the honour twice.

"The first time I got in touch with aviation was when my father took me for a ride. He's a pilot as well," remembers Bergér, who was born in Eichstätt in 1989. "Ever since, I've been fascinated by aviation."

Bergér began his career by piloting gliders and still cross-trains with them when time permits, in addition to flying as a First Officer for Lufthansa. He received his foundational aerobatic training at the flying school of champion Red Bull Air Race pilot Matthias Dolderer in Tannheim, and has been representing his country at international competitions since 2014. Successes include third place in the team competition at the European Aerobatic Championships and several individual medals in the Unlimited category at German Nationals, including 5x Unlimited German Aerobatic Champion and 4x Freestyle German Aerobatic Champion.

When Bergér joined the Challenger Class in 2015, he was one of the youngest pilots ever to fly in the Red Bull Air Race. Eager to expand his Air Racing skills, over his first three seasons he clinched a total of 10 race podiums. Highlights include his maiden race win in Spielberg, Austria, and victory at his very first home race at Germany's EuroSpeedway Lausitz, both in 2016. The wins continued in 2017, when he topped the podium at the stop in San Diego, US, and triumphed in Budapest, Hungary, the spiritual home of the Red Bull Air Race. Bergér's experience will continue to grow throughout the 2018 season, as he masters the new raceplane for the Challenger Class – an Edge 540 V2.

In 2015, he joined the Red Bull Air Race as Challenger class pilot. He won the Challenger class in 2016, 2017 and 2019 (2019 no official ranking)

== Results ==
=== Red Bull Air Race ===
==== Challenger Class ====
Year	1	2	3	4	5	6	7	8	Points	Wins	Position
2015	(United Arab Emirates); 4th	(Japan); 4th	(Croatia); DNP	(Hungary); 6th	(United Kingdom); 5th	(Austria); 5th	(United States); 3rd		14	0	(United States) 5th
2016	(United Arab Emirates); 3rd	(Austria); 1st	(Japan); DNP	(Hungary); 4th	(United Kingdom); 2nd	(Germany); 1st	(United States); DNP	(United States); CAN	28	2	1st
2017	(United Arab Emirates); 2nd	(United States); 1st	(Hungary); 1st	(Russia); DNP	(Russia); DNP	(Portugal); 2nd	(Germany); 2nd	(United States); 4th	38	2	1st
2018	(United Arab Emirates); 1st	(France); DNP	(Hungary); 2nd	(Russia); DNP	(Austria); DNP	(Austria); DNP	(United States); 1st		36	2	(United States) 2nd
2019	(United Arab Emirates) 1st	(Russia) 1st	(Hungary) DNP	(Japan) 1st	-	-	-		-	3	-

Legend: * CAN: Cancelled * DNP: Did not take part * DNS: Did not start * DSQ: Disqualified
