= 2017 Red Bull Air Race of Lausitz =

Coordinates: 51°32′00″N 13°55′10″E

Race Track (Lausitzring)

The 2017 Red Bull Air Race of Lausitz was the sixth round of the 2017 Red Bull Air Race World Championship season, the twelfth season of the Red Bull Air Race World Championship. The event was held at the Lausitzring in the Brandenburg state of Germany.

== Master Class ==
=== Qualification ===
Pos	No.	Pilot	Run Time	Pen
1	95	(Australia) Matt Hall	0:50.227	
2	18	(Czech Republic) Petr Kopfstein	0:50.299	
3	31	(Japan) Yoshihide Muroya	0:50.400	
4	10	(United States) Kirby Chambliss	0:50.472	
5	8	(Czech Republic) Martin Šonka	0:50.733	
6	21	(Germany) Matthias Dolderer	0:50.751	
7	84	(Canada) Pete McLeod	0:50.756	
8	99	(United States) Michael Goulian	0:51.118	
9	26	(Spain) Juan Velarde	0:51.446	
10	27	(France) Nicolas Ivanoff	0:51.543	
11	11	(France) Mikaël Brageot	0:51.637	
12	12	(France) François Le Vot	0:52.297	
13	37	(Slovenia) Peter Podlunšek	0:52.373	
14	5	(Chile) Cristian Bolton	0:52.689	

=== Round of 14 ===
Heat	Pilot One	Time One	Time Two	Pilot Two
1	(France) Nicolas Ivanoff	0:51.296	0:50.617	(Czech Republic) Martin Šonka
2	(France) Mikaël Brageot	0:51.141	0:50.720	(United States) Kirby Chambliss
3	(Spain) Juan Velarde	0:50.650	0:53.957 ^{1}	(Germany) Matthias Dolderer
4	(France) François Le Vot	0:52.640	0:52.048	(Japan) Yoshihide Muroya
5	(United States) Michael Goulian	0:54.572 ^{2}	0:52.672 ^{3}	(Canada) Pete McLeod
6	(Slovenia) Peter Podlunšek	0:54.482	0:52.076	(Czech Republic) Petr Kopfstein
7	(Chile) Cristian Bolton	0:53.932	0:51.241	(Australia) Matt Hall

Key
Qualified for next round
Knocked out
Fastest loser, qualified

- ^1 +0:03
- ^2 +0:02
- ^3 +0:04

=== Round of 8 ===
Heat	Pilot One	Time One	Time Two	Pilot Two
8	(Australia) Matt Hall	0:51.731	0:51.733	(France) Mikael Brageot
9	(Japan) Yoshihide Muroya	0:50.772	0:51.398	(United States) Kirby Chambliss
10	(Czech Republic) Petr Kopfstein	DNF	0:52.216	(Spain) Juan Velarde
11	(Canada) Pete McLeod	0:50.898	0:50.596	(Czech Republic) Martin Sonka

Key
Qualified for next round
Knocked out

=== Final 4 ===
Pos	No.	Pilot	Run Time	Pen
1	8	(Japan) Yoshihide Muroya	0:50.451	
2	84	(Australia) Matt Hall	0:50.846	
3	95	(Czech Republic) Martin Sonka	0:50.964	
4	26	(Spain) Juan Velarde	0:53.680	+0:02 ^{1}

- ^1

=== Final result ===
Pos	Pilot	Points
1	(Japan) Yoshihide Muroya	15
2	(Australia) Matt Hall	12
3	(Czech Republic) Martin Šonka	9
4	(Spain) Juan Velarde	7
5	(Canada) Pete McLeod	6
6	(United States) Kirby Chambliss	5
7	(France) Mikaël Brageot	4
8	(Czech Republic) Petr Kopfstein	3
9	(France) Nicolas Ivanoff	2
10	(France) François Le Vot	1
11	(Chile) Cristian Bolton	0
12	(Germany) Matthias Dolderer	0
13	(Slovenia) Peter Podlunšek	0
14	(United States) Michael Goulian	0

== Challenger Class ==
=== Qualification ===
Pos	No.	Pilot	Run Time	Pen
1	24	(United Kingdom) Ben Murphy	1:00.123	
2	62	(Germany) Florian Berger	1:00.377	
3	78	(Hungary) Daniel Genevey	1:00.422	
4	33	(France) Mélanie Astles	1:00.492	
5	17	(Sweden) Daniel Ryfa	1:00.578	
6	6	(Poland) Luke Czepiela	DSQ	

=== Results ===
Pos	No.	Pilot	Run Time	Pen
1	17	(Sweden) Daniel Ryfa	0:59.931	
2	62	(Germany) Florian Berger	0:59.944	
3	6	(Poland) Luke Czepiela	1:01.590	
4	24	(United Kingdom) Ben Murphy	1:03.249	+0:02
5	33	(France) Mélanie Astles	1:03.394	+0:03
6	78	(Hungary) Daniel Genevey	DNF	

== Standings after the event ==
Master Class standings

Pos	Pilot	Pts
1	(Czech Republic) Martin Sonka	63
2	(Japan) Yoshihide Muroya	59
3	(Canada) Pete McLeod	56
4	(United States) Kirby Chambliss	52
5	(Australia) Matt Hall	37
6	(Czech Republic) Petr Kopfstein	37
7	(Spain) Juan Velarde	28
8	(Germany) Matthias Dolderer	27
9	(United States) Michael Goulian	24
10	(France) Mikael Brageot	19
11	(France) Nicolas Ivanoff	16
12	(Slovenia) Peter Podlunsek	14
13	(France) Francois Le Vot	9
14	(Chile) Cristian Bolton	7

Challenger Class standings

Pos	Pilot	Pts
1	(Germany) Florian Berger	36
2	(Sweden) Daniel Ryfa	34
3	(Poland) Luke Czepiela	30
4	(United States) Kevin Coleman	26
5	(France) Mélanie Astles	18
6	(United Kingdom) Ben Murphy	16
7	(France) Baptiste Vignes	14
8	(China) Kenny Chiang	12
9	(Hungary) Daniel Genevey	12

Previous race: 2017 Red Bull Air Race of Porto	Red Bull Air Race; 2017 season	Next race: 2017 Red Bull Air Race of Indianapolis
Previous race: 2016 Red Bull Air Race of Lausitz	Red Bull Air Race of Lausitz	Next race: 2018 Red Bull Air Race of Lausitz
