= 2017 Red Bull Air Race of Budapest =

Coordinates: 47°30′23″N 19°02′33″E

Race Track

The 2017 Red Bull Air Race of Budapest was the fourth round of the 2017 Red Bull Air Race World Championship season, the eleventh season of the Red Bull Air Race World Championship. The event was held on the Danube in Budapest, Hungary.

== Master Class ==
=== Qualification ===
Pos	No.	Pilot	Run Time	Pen
1	84	(Canada) Pete McLeod	59.508	
2	31	(Japan) Yoshihide Muroya	59.950	
3	18	(Czech Republic) Petr Kopfstein	1:01.296	
4	8	(Czech Republic) Martin Sonka	1:01.345	
5	95	(Australia) Matt Hall	1:01.431	
6	99	(United States) Michael Goulian	1:01.541	
7	10	(United States) Kirby Chambliss	1:01.546	
8	12	(France) Francois Le Vot	1:02.444	
9	27	(France) Nicolas Ivanoff	1:02.515	
10	11	(France) Mikael Brageot	1:02.588	
11	37	(Slovenia) Peter Podlunsek	1:03.818	
12	5	(Chile) Cristian Bolton	1:05.235	+2sec^{1}
13	21	(Germany) Matthias Dolderer	DNF^{2}	
14	26	(Spain) Juan Velarde	DNF^{3}	

- ^1 Incorrect passing (Incorrect Level Flying) at gate 8
- ^2 Exceeding Maximum G in gate 13
- ^3 Exceeding Maximum G in gate 7

=== Round of 14 ===
Heat	Pilot One	Time One	Time Two	Pilot Two
1	(France) Mikaël Brageot	1:01.970	1:02.336	(Australia) Matt Hall
2	(Slovenia) Peter Podlunsek	DNS^{1}	1:02.138	(Czech Republic) Martin Sonka
3	(France) Nicolas Ivanoff	1:00.908	DNF ^{2}	(United States) Michael Goulian
4	(Chile) Cristian Bolton	1:03.356	1:01.872	(Czech Republic) Petr Kopfstein
5	(France) Francois Le Vot	1:02.529	1:01.786	(United States) Kirby Chambliss
6	(Germany) Matthias Dolderer	DNF ^{3}	1:00.572	(Japan) Yoshihide Muroya
7	(Spain) Juan Velarde	1:02.484	1:01.033	(Canada) Pete McLeod

Key
Qualified for next round
Knocked out
Fastest loser, qualified

- ^1 due to technical issues
- ^2 Exceeding Maximum G in gate 18
- ^3 Exceeding Maximum G in gate 7

=== Round of 8 ===
Heat	Pilot One	Time One	Time Two	Pilot Two
8	(Czech Republic) Petr Kopfstein	1:02.448^{1}	1:01.214	(United States) Kirby Chambliss
9	(France) Mikael Brageot	1:03.027^{2}	1:02.949	(Canada) Pete McLeod
10	(Czech Republic) Martin Sonka	1:00.428	1:03.849^{3}	(France) Nicolas Ivanoff
11	(Australia) Matt Hall	DNF^{4}	1:04.750^{5}	(Japan) Yoshihide Muroya

Key
Qualified for next round
Knocked out

- ^1 Incorrect passing (Sinking in the gate) at gate 19
- ^2 Incorrect passing (Climbing in the gate) at gate 7
- ^3 Incorrect passing (Incorrect Level Flying) at gate 17
- ^4 Exceeding Maximum G in gate 7
- ^5 Incorrect passing (Sinking in the gate) at gate 8

=== Final 4 ===
Pos	No.	Pilot	Run Time	Pen
1	10	(United States) Kirby Chambliss	1:00.632	
2	84	(Canada) Pete McLeod	1:00.740	
3	31	(Japan) Yoshihide Muroya	1:01.188	
4	8	(Czech Republic) Martin Sonka	1:01.699	+2sec^{1}

- ^1 Incorrect passing (Climbing in the gate) at Gate 18

== Challenger Class ==
=== Results ===
Pos	No.	Pilot	Run Time	Pen
1	62	(Germany) Florian Berger	1:09.946	
2	6	(Poland) Luke Czepiela	1:13.515	
3	17	(Sweden) Daniel Ryfa	1:14.735	+2sec^{1}
4	15	(France) Baptiste Vignes	1:15.048	
5	7	(China) Kenny Chiang	1:17.042	+4sec^{2}
6	78	(Hungary) Daniel Genevey	1:20.649	+4sec^{3}

- ^1 Incorrect passing (Incorrect Level Flying) at gate 3
- ^2 Incorrect passing (Incorrect Level Flying) at gate 6, Incorrect passing (Climbing in the gate) at gate 18
- ^3 Incorrect passing (Flying too high) at gate 5, Incorrect passing (Incorrect Level Flying) at gate 11

== Standings after the event ==
Master Class standings

Pos	Pilot	Pts
1	(Japan) Yoshihide Muroya	39
2	(Czech Republic) Martin Sonka	37
3	(Canada) Pete McLeod	26
4	(United States) Kirby Chambliss	25
5	(Czech Republic) Petr Kopfstein	23
6	(Germany) Matthias Dolderer	23
7	(Spain) Juan Velarde	15
8	(United States) Michael Goulian	14
9	(France) Nicolas Ivanoff	14
10	(Slovenia) Peter Podlunsek	12
11	(Australia) Matt Hall	11
12	(France) Mikael Brageot	9
13	(Chile) Cristian Bolton	4
14	(France) Francois Le Vot	4

Challenger Class standings

Pos	Pilot	Pts
1	(Germany) Florian Berger	28
2	(Sweden) Daniel Ryfa	16
3	(Poland) Luke Czepiela	14
4	(United States) Kevin Coleman	10
5	(France) Mélanie Astles	6
6	(France) Baptiste Vignes	6
7	(Hungary) Daniel Genevey	4
8	(United Kingdom) Ben Murphy	4
9	(China) Kenny Chiang	2

Previous race: 2017 Red Bull Air Race of Chiba	Red Bull Air Race; 2017 season	Next race: 2017 Red Bull Air Race of Kazan
Previous race: 2016 Red Bull Air Race of Budapest	Red Bull Air Race of Budapest	Next race: 2018 Red Bull Air Race of Budapest
