= 2017 Red Bull Air Race of San Diego =

2017 air race in San Diego, California

Coordinates: 32°42′18″N 117°10′10″W

Race Track

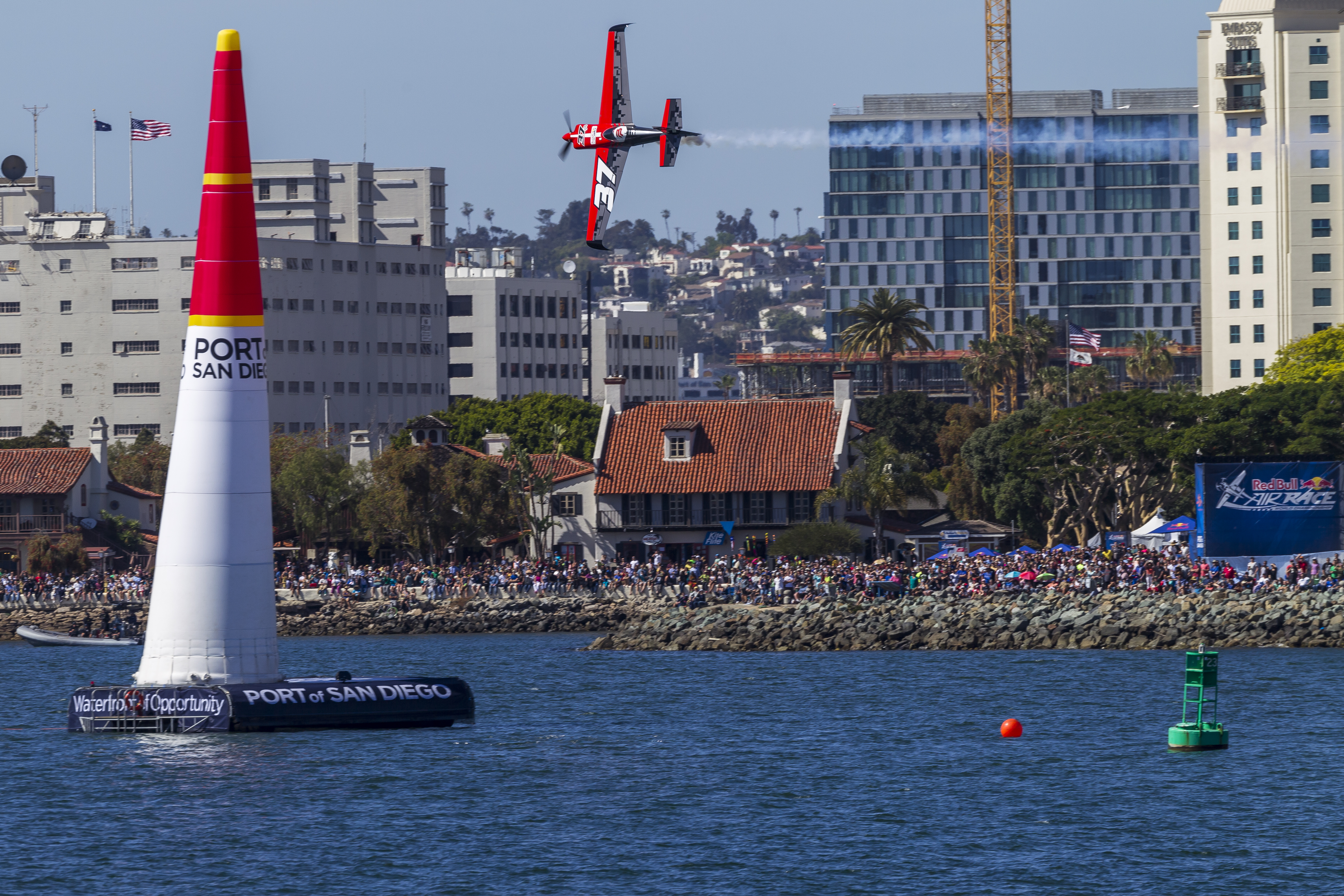
Red Bull Air Race of San Diego (Peter Podlunšek)

The 2017 Red Bull Air Race of San Diego was the second round of the 2017 Red Bull Air Race World Championship, the twelfth season of the Red Bull Air Race World Championship. The event was held in San Diego, California, a city in the United States.

== Master Class ==
=== Qualification ===
Pos	No.	Pilot	Run Time	Pen
1	21	(Germany) Matthias Dolderer	58.332	
2	99	(United States) Michael Goulian	58.978	
3	8	(Czech Republic) Martin Sonka	58.980	
4	95	(Australia) Matt Hall	59.516	
5	84	(Canada) Pete McLeod	59.627	
6	10	(United States) Kirby Chambliss	1:00.256	
7	26	(Spain) Juan Velarde	1:00.326	
8	18	(Czech Republic) Petr Kopfstein	1:00.331	
9	12	(France) Francois Le Vot	1:01.097	
10	31	(Japan) Yoshihide Muroya	1:01.384	+2sec^{1}
11	37	(Slovenia) Peter Podlunsek	1:01.566	+2sec^{2}
12	27	(France) Nicolas Ivanoff	1:01.606	+2sec^{3}
13	5	(Chile) Cristian Bolton	1:04.156	
14	11	(France) Mikael Brageot	DNS	

=== Round of 14 ===
Heat	Pilot One	Time One	Time Two	Pilot Two
1	(Japan) Yoshihide Muroya	59.280	59.738	(Canada) Pete McLeod
2	(Slovenia) Peter Podlunsek	58.929	59.672	(Australia) Matt Hall
3	(France) Francois Le Vot	1:00.788	1:00.573	(United States) Kirby Chambliss
4	(France) Nicolas Ivanoff	59.067	59.479	(Czech Republic) Martin Sonka
5	(Czech Republic) Petr Kopfstein	59.730	1:00.246	(Spain) Juan Velarde
6	(Chile) Cristian Bolton	1:08.266^{1}	1:02.281^{2}	(United States) Michael Goulian
7	(France) Mikael Brageot	1:01.200	59.186	(Germany) Matthias Dolderer

Key
Qualified for next round
Knocked out
Fastest loser, qualified

=== Round of 8 ===
Heat	Pilot One	Time One	Time Two	Pilot Two
8	(Czech Republic) Martin Sonka	59.492	59.271	(Japan) Yoshihide Muroya
9	(Czech Republic) Petr Kopfstein	59.835	59.105	(Germany) Matthias Dolderer
10	(United States) Kirby Chambliss	1:00.855	1:01.946^{1}	(France) Nicolas Ivanoff
11	(United States) Michael Goulian	1:02.118^{2}	1:01.432	(Slovenia) Peter Podlunsek

Key
Qualified for next round
Knocked out

=== Final 4 ===
Pos	No.	Pilot	Run Time	Pen
1	31	(Japan) Yoshihide Muroya	58.529	
2	37	(Slovenia) Peter Podlunsek	1:00.454	
3	21	(Germany) Matthias Dolderer	1:01.648	+3sec^{1}
4	10	(United States) Kirby Chambliss	1:02.713	+2sec^{2}

== Challenger Class ==
=== Results ===
Pos	No.	Pilot	Run Time	Pen
1	62	(Germany) Florian Bergér	1:09.383	
2	48	(United States) Kevin Coleman	1:10.802	
3	6	(Poland) Luke Czepiela	1:12.576	
4	78	(Hungary) Daniel Genevey	1:15.115	
5	15	(France) Baptiste Vignes	1:15.616	+3sec^{1}
6	7	(China) Kenny Chiang	1:18.463	+6sec^{2}

- ^1 Pilon Hit
- ^2 Pilon Hit

== Standings after the event ==
Master Class standings

Pos	Pilot	Pts
1	(Czech Republic) Martin Sonka	21
2	(Germany) Matthias Dolderer	16
3	(Japan) Yoshihide Muroya	15
4	(Spain) Juan Velarde	12
5	(Slovenia) Peter Podlunsek	12
6	(Canada) Pete McLeod	10
7	(France) Nicolas Ivanoff	10
8	(United States) Michael Goulian	8
9	(United States) Kirby Chambliss	7
10	(Czech Republic) Petr Kopfstein	5
11	(Chile) Cristian Bolton	4
12	(France) Francois Le Vot	3
13	(Australia) Matt Hall	3
14	(France) Mikael Brageot	2

Challenger Class standings

Pos	Pilot	Pts
1	(Germany) Florian Berger	18
2	(Sweden) Daniel Ryfa	10
3	(United States) Kevin Coleman	10
4	(Poland) Luke Czepiela	6
5	(France) Melanie Astles	6
6	(Hungary) Daniel Genevey	4
7	(United Kingdom) Ben Murphy	4
8	(France) Baptiste Vignes	2
9	(China) Kenny Chiang	0

Previous race: 2017 Red Bull Air Race of Abu Dhabi	Red Bull Air Race; 2017 season	Next race: 2017 Red Bull Air Race of Chiba
Previous race: 2009 Red Bull Air Race of San Diego	Red Bull Air Race of San Diego	Next race: none
