= 2017 Red Bull Air Race of Porto =

Coordinates: 41°08′21″N 08°36′58″W

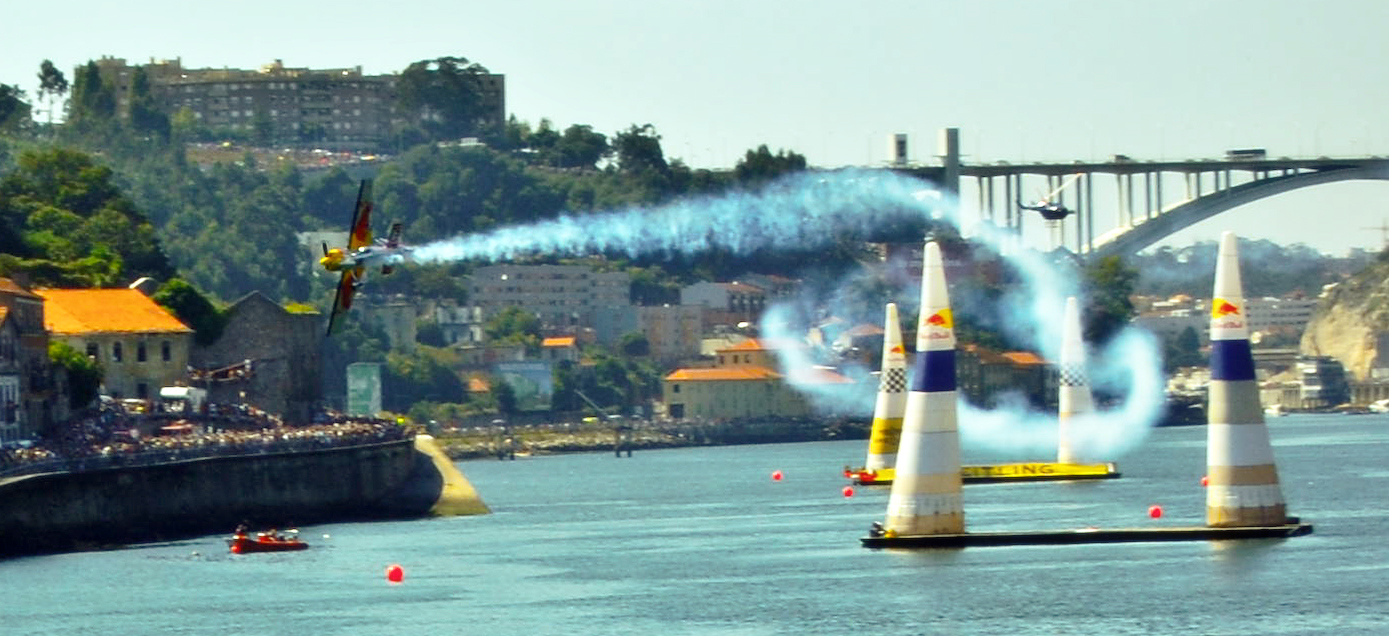
2017 Red Bull Air Race of Porto

Race Track

The 2017 Red Bull Air Race of Porto was the fifth round of the 2017 Red Bull Air Race World Championship season, the twelfth season of the Red Bull Air Race World Championship. The event was held on Douro River in Porto, Portugal.

== Master Class ==
=== Qualification ===
Pos	No.	Pilot	Run Time	Pen
1	84	(Canada) Pete McLeod	1:07.192	
2	10	(United States) Kirby Chambliss	1:07.942	
3	31	(Japan) Yoshihide Muroya	1:07.972	
4	18	(Czech Republic) Petr Kopfstein	1:07.979	
5	99	(United States) Michael Goulian	1:08.025	
6	95	(Australia) Matt Hall	1:08.186	
7	8	(Czech Republic) Martin Šonka	1:08.602	
8	12	(France) François Le Vot	1:08.903	
9	21	(Germany) Matthias Dolderer	1:09.000	
10	11	(France) Mikaël Brageot	1:09.008	
11	27	(France) Nicolas Ivanoff	1:09.244	
12	37	(Slovenia) Peter Podlunšek	1:11.117	+0:02^{1}
13	26	(Spain) Juan Velarde	DNS	
14	5	(Chile) Cristian Bolton	DNS	

- ^1 Incorrect Passing Of An Air Gate: Incorrect Level Flying

=== Round of 14 ===
Heat	Pilot One	Time One	Time Two	Pilot Two
1	(France) Mikaël Brageot	1:08.243	1:08.371	(United States) Michael Goulian
2	(France) Nicolas Ivanoff	1:08.380	1:07.886	(Czech Republic) Petr Kopfstein
3	(Germany) Matthias Dolderer	1:07.762	1:07.664	(Australia) Matt Hall
4	(Slovenia) Peter Podlunšek	1:08.287	1:07.819	(Japan) Yoshihide Muroya
5	(France) François Le Vot	1:11.189 ^{1}	1:07.797	(Czech Republic) Martin Šonka
6	(Spain) Juan Velarde	DNS	1:07.784	(United States) Kirby Chambliss
7	(Chile) Cristian Bolton	1:09.729	1:08.176	(Canada) Pete McLeod

Key
Qualified for next round
Knocked out
Fastest loser, qualified

- ^1 +0:03

=== Round of 8 ===
Heat	Pilot One	Time One	Time Two	Pilot Two
8	(Japan) Yoshihide Muroya	1:08.414 ^{1}	1:07.991	(Czech Republic) Martin Šonka
9	(Czech Republic) Petr Kopfstein	1:08.452	1:07.835	(United States) Kirby Chambliss
10	(Canada) Pete McLeod	1:07.230	1:08.460	(Germany) Matthias Dolderer
11	(France) Mikaël Brageot	1:08.368	1:08.151	(Australia) Matt Hall

Key
Qualified for next round
Knocked out

- ^1 +0:01

=== Final 4 ===
Pos	No.	Pilot	Run Time	Pen
1	8	(Czech Republic) Martin Šonka	1:07.229	
2	84	(Canada) Pete McLeod	1:07.342	
3	95	(Australia) Matt Hall	1:08.508	
4	10	(United States) Kirby Chambliss	1:09.141	+0:02 ^{1}

- ^1

=== Final result ===
Pos	Pilot	Points
1	(Czech Republic) Martin Šonka	15
2	(Canada) Pete McLeod	12
3	(Australia) Matt Hall	9
4	(United States) Kirby Chambliss	7
5	(France) Mikaël Brageot	6
6	(Japan) Yoshihide Muroya	5
7	(Czech Republic) Petr Kopfstein	4
8	(Germany) Matthias Dolderer	3
9	(Slovenia) Peter Podlunšek	2
10	(United States) Michael Goulian	1
11	(France) Nicolas Ivanoff	0
12	(Chile) Cristian Bolton	0
13	(France) François Le Vot	0
14	(Spain) Juan Velarde	0

== Challenger Class ==
=== Qualification ===
Pos	No.	Pilot	Run Time	Pen
1	62	(Germany) Florian Berger	1:20.742	
2	78	(Hungary) Daniel Genevey	1:20.999	+0:01
3	24	(United Kingdom) Ben Murphy	1:22.064	+0:01
4	7	(China) Kenny Chiang	1:22.145	
5	33	(France) Mélanie Astles	1:24.400	+0:04
6	48	(United States) Kevin Coleman	1:24.556	+0:03

=== Results ===
Pos	No.	Pilot	Run Time	Pen
1	48	(United States) Kevin Coleman	1:19.019	
2	62	(Germany) Florian Berger	1:19.196	
3	33	(France) Mélanie Astles	1:19.756	
4	78	(Hungary) Daniel Genevey	1:20.014	
5	24	(United Kingdom) Ben Murphy	1:21.322	+0:02
6	7	(China) Kenny Chiang	1:21.762	+0:02

== Standings after the event ==
Master Class standings

Pos	Pilot	Pts
1	(Czech Republic) Martin Sonka	54
2	(Canada) Pete McLeod	50
3	(United States) Kirby Chambliss	47
4	(Japan) Yoshihide Muroya	44
5	(Czech Republic) Petr Kopfstein	34
6	(Germany) Matthias Dolderer	27
7	(Australia) Matt Hall	25
8	(United States) Michael Goulian	24
9	(Spain) Juan Velarde	21
10	(France) Mikael Brageot	15
11	(Slovenia) Peter Podlunsek	14
12	(France) Nicolas Ivanoff	14
13	(France) Francois Le Vot	8
14	(Chile) Cristian Bolton	7

Challenger Class standings

Pos	Pilot	Pts
1	(Germany) Florian Berger	36
2	(United States) Kevin Coleman	26
3	(Sweden) Daniel Ryfa	24
4	(Poland) Luke Czepiela	24
5	(France) Mélanie Astles	18
6	(France) Baptiste Vignes	14
7	(United Kingdom) Ben Murphy	14
8	(China) Kenny Chiang	12
9	(Hungary) Daniel Genevey	12

Previous race: 2017 Red Bull Air Race of Kazan	Red Bull Air Race; 2017 season	Next race: 2017 Red Bull Air Race of Lausitz
Previous race: 2009 Red Bull Air Race of Porto	Red Bull Air Race of Porto	Next race: -
