= 2016 Red Bull Air Race of Lausitz =

Coordinates: 51°32′00″N 13°55′10″E

Race Track (Lausitzring)

The 2016 Red Bull Air Race of Lausitz was the sixth round of the 2016 Red Bull Air Race World Championship season, the eleventh season of the Red Bull Air Race World Championship. The event was held at the Lausitzring in the Brandenburg state of Germany.

This was the last event before the death of the 2008 champion Hannes Arch.

== Master Class ==
=== Qualification ===
Pos	No.	Pilot	Run Time	Pen
1	9	(United Kingdom) Nigel Lamb	53.110	
2	95	(Australia) Matt Hall	54.413	
3	31	(Japan) Yoshihide Muroya	54.700	
4	22	(Austria) Hannes Arch	54.791	
5	84	(Canada) Pete McLeod	54.933	
6	10	(United States) Kirby Chambliss	55.444	
7	21	(Germany) Matthias Dolderer	55.470	
8	99	(United States) Michael Goulian	55.474	
9	18	(Czech Republic) Petr Kopfstein	57.517	
10	12	(France) François Le Vot	57.662	
11	26	(Spain) Juan Velarde	58.542	
12	27	(France) Nicolas Ivanoff	58.569	+2secs
13	37	(Slovenia) Peter Podlunšek	1:01.549	+5secs
14	8	(Czech Republic) Martin Šonka	DSQ	

=== Round of 14 ===
Heat	Pilot One	Time One	Time Two	Pilot Two
1	(Canada) Pete McLeod (5)	55.552	57.224	(France) François Le Vot (10)
2	(Austria) Hannes Arch (4)	55.668	55.972	(Spain) Juan Velarde (11)
3	(United States) Kirby Chambliss (6)	54.736	56.238	(Czech Republic) Petr Kopfstein (9)
4	(Japan) Yoshihide Muroya (3)	DNF	57.088^{1}	(France) Nicolas Ivanoff (12)
5	(Germany) Matthias Dolderer (7)	53.528	54.263	(United States) Michael Goulian (8)
6	(Australia) Matt Hall (2)	53.816	57.614^{1}	(Slovenia) Peter Podlunšek (13)
7	(United Kingdom) Nigel Lamb (1)	55.601^{1}	56.008^{1}	(Czech Republic) Martin Šonka (14)

Key
Qualified for next round
Knocked out
Fastest loser, qualified

^1 Pilot received 2 seconds in penalties.

=== Round of 8 ===
Heat	Pilot One	Time One	Time Two	Pilot Two
1	(Canada) Pete McLeod (5)	55.496	58.458^{1}	(United States) Kirby Chambliss (6)
2	(United States) Michael Goulian (8)	55.128	53.871	(Czech Republic) Martin Šonka (14)
3	(Australia) Matt Hall (2)	54.450	54.452	(Austria) Hannes Arch (4)
4	(Germany) Matthias Dolderer (7)	54.867	55.130	(France) Nicolas Ivanoff (12)

Key
Qualified for next round
Knocked out

^1 Pilot received 3 seconds in penalties.

=== Final 4 ===
Pos	No.	Pilot	Run Time	Pen
1	95	(Australia) Matt Hall	53.642	
2	21	(Germany) Matthias Dolderer	54.417	
3	84	(Canada) Pete McLeod	54.916	
4	8	(Czech Republic) Martin Šonka	56.126	

== Challenger Class ==
=== Results ===
Pos	No.	Pilot	Run Time	Pen
1	62	(Germany) Florian Berger	1:04.985	
2	6	(Poland) Luke Czepiela	1:05.524	
3	24	(United Kingdom) Ben Murphy	1:06.652	
4	17	(Sweden) Daniel Ryfa	1:07.172	+3secs
5	33	(France) Mélanie Astles	1:07.843	
6	48	(United States) Kevin Coleman	1:08.312	+5secs

== Standings after the event ==
Master Class standings

Pos	Pilot	Pts
1	(Germany) Matthias Dolderer	65.25
2	(Australia) Matt Hall	48.75
3	(Austria) Hannes Arch	41
4	(United States) Kirby Chambliss	30.25
5	(France) Nicolas Ivanoff	30

Challenger Class standings

Pos	Pilot	Pts
1	(Germany) Florian Berger	28
2	(Sweden) Daniel Ryfa	26
2	(United States) Kevin Coleman	26
4	(Chile) Cristian Bolton	20
4	(Poland) Luke Czepiela	20

- Note: Only the top five positions are included for both sets of standings.

Previous race: 2016 Red Bull Air Race of Ascot	Red Bull Air Race; 2016 season	Next race: 2016 Red Bull Air Race of Indianapolis
Previous race: 2010 Red Bull Air Race of Lausitz	Red Bull Air Race of Lausitz	Next race: 2017 Red Bull Air Race of Lausitz
