= 2016 Red Bull Air Race of Indianapolis =

Coordinates: 39°47′54″N 86°13′58″W

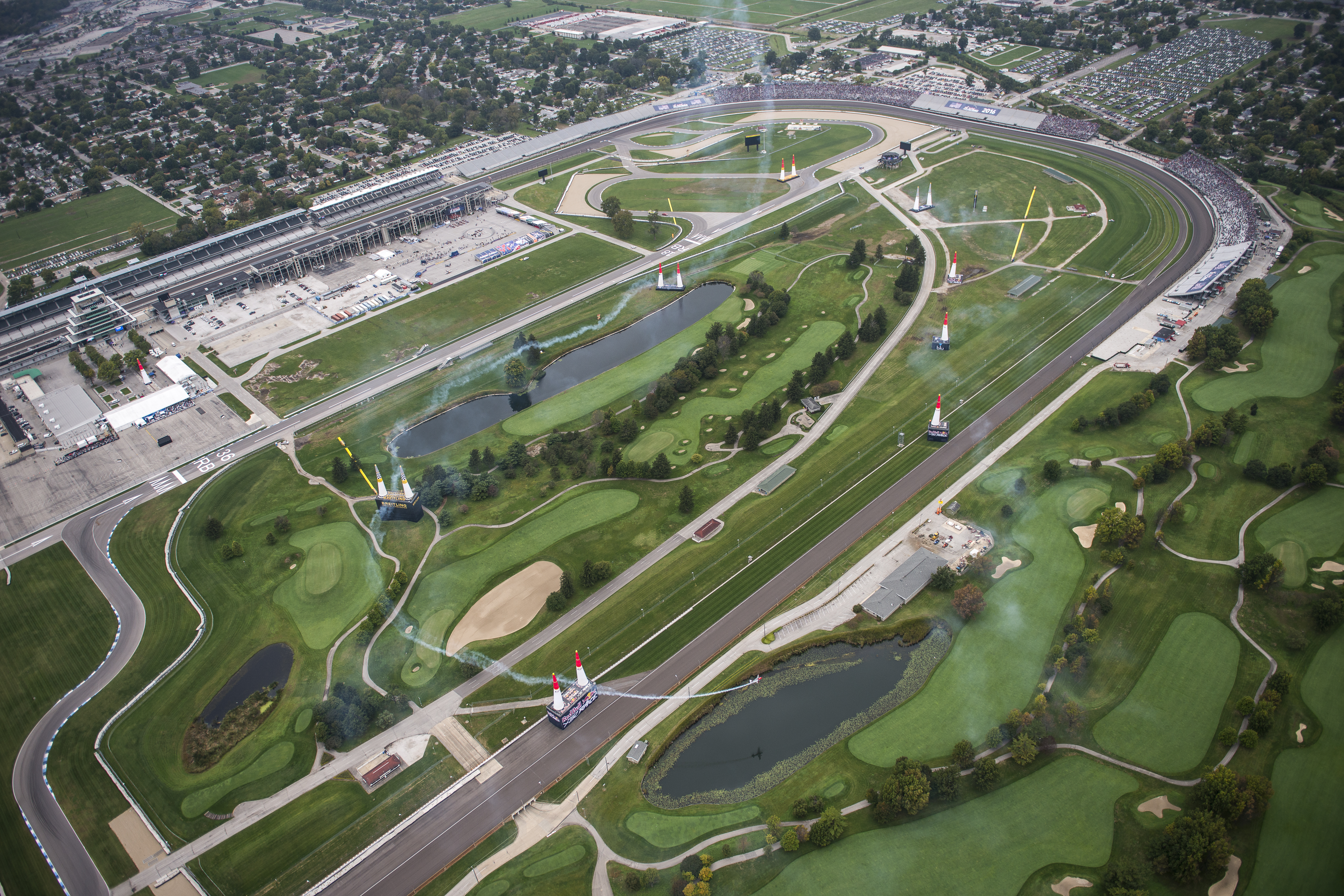
Peter Podlunsek during the 2016 Red Bull Air Race of Indianapolis

Race Track (Indianapolis Motor Speedway)

The 2016 Red Bull Air Race of Indianapolis was the seventh round of the 2016 Red Bull Air Race World Championship, the eleventh season of the Red Bull Air Race World Championship. The event took place at the Indianapolis Motor Speedway, in Indianapolis, the United States. German pilot Matthias Dolderer wrapped up his first championship with a round remaining, while Chilean pilot Cristian Bolton made his debut as a replacement for the late Hannes Arch.

== Master Class ==
=== Qualification ===
Pos	No.	Pilot	Run Time	Pen
1	31	(Japan) Yoshihide Muroya	1:02.073	
2	95	(Australia) Matt Hall	1:02.255	
3	9	(United Kingdom) Nigel Lamb	1:03.209	
4	21	(Germany) Matthias Dolderer	1:03.378	
5	26	(Spain) Juan Velarde	1:04.052	
6	8	(Czech Republic) Martin Šonka	1:04.144	+1sec
7	84	(Canada) Pete McLeod	1:04.185	+2sec
8	10	(United States) Kirby Chambliss	1:04.516	+1sec
9	99	(United States) Michael Goulian	1:05.043	+2sec
10	18	(Czech Republic) Petr Kopfstein	1:05.267	
11	27	(France) Nicolas Ivanoff	1:05.500	+2sec
12	12	(France) François Le Vot	1:05.785	
13	37	(Slovenia) Peter Podlunšek	1:06.349	+1sec
14	5	(Chile) Cristian Bolton	1:07.408	

=== Round of 14 ===
Heat	Pilot One	Time One	Time Two	Pilot Two
1	(Spain) Juan Velarde (5)	1:05.984	1:06.133	(Czech Republic) Petr Kopfstein (10)
2	(Germany) Matthias Dolderer (4)	1:03.661	1:05.026	(France) Nicolas Ivanoff (11)
3	(Czech Republic) Martin Šonka (6)	1:06.393^{2}	1:06.534	(United States) Michael Goulian (9)
4	(United Kingdom) Nigel Lamb (3)	1:04.984	1:07.597^{1}	(France) François Le Vot (12)
5	(Canada) Pete McLeod (7)	1:05.249^{2}	DSQ	(United States) Kirby Chambliss (8)
6	(Australia) Matt Hall (2)	1:04.179	1:06.660^{2}	(Slovenia) Peter Podlunšek (13)
7	(Japan) Yoshihide Muroya (1)	1:07.697^{3}	1:08.532^{2}	(Chile) Cristian Bolton (14)

Key
Qualified for next round
Knocked out
Fastest loser, qualified

^1 Pilot received 1 second in penalties

^2 Pilot received 2 seconds in penalties

^3 Pilot received 4 seconds in penalties

=== Round of 8 ===
Heat	Pilot One	Time One	Time Two	Pilot Two
1	(Canada) Pete McLeod (7)	1:04.525	1:05.888	(France) Nicolas Ivanoff (11)
2	(United Kingdom) Nigel Lamb (3)	1:07.285^{1}	1:08.713^{2}	(Spain) Juan Velarde (5)
3	(Australia) Matt Hall (2)	1:04.322	1:07.446^{1}	(Czech Republic) Martin Šonka (6)
4	(Japan) Yoshihide Muroya (1)	1:03.730	1:02.827	(Germany) Matthias Dolderer (4)

Key
Qualified for next round
Knocked out

^1 Pilot received 3 seconds in penalties

^2 Pilot received 4 seconds in penalties

=== Final 4 ===
Pos	No.	Pilot	Run Time	Pen
1	21	(Germany) Matthias Dolderer	1:03.335	
2	9	(United Kingdom) Nigel Lamb	1:04.326	
3	84	(Canada) Pete McLeod	1:05.398	
4	95	(Australia) Matt Hall	1:06.623	+3sec

== Challenger Class ==
=== Results ===
Pos	No.	Pilot	Run Time	Pen
1	6	(Poland) Luke Czepiela	1:16.484	
2	33	(France) Mélanie Astles	1:17.053	
3	24	(United Kingdom) Ben Murphy	1:20.651	+3sec
4	48	(United States) Kevin Coleman	1:24.503	+6sec

== Standings after the event ==
Master Class standings

Pos	Pilot	Pts
1	(Germany) Matthias Dolderer	80.25
2	(Australia) Matt Hall	55.75
3	(Austria) Hannes Arch	41
4	(United Kingdom) Nigel Lamb	37.75
5	(France) Nicolas Ivanoff	35

Challenger Class standings

Pos	Pilot	Pts
1	(Germany) Florian Berger	28
2	(Sweden) Daniel Ryfa	26
2	(United States) Kevin Coleman	26
4	(Poland) Luke Czepiela	24
5	(Chile) Cristian Bolton	20
5	(United Kingdom) Ben Murphy	20

- Note: Only the top five positions are included for both sets of standings.

Previous race: 2016 Red Bull Air Race of Lausitz	Red Bull Air Race; 2016 season	Next race: 2016 Red Bull Air Race of Las Vegas
Previous race: None	Red Bull Air Race of Indianapolis	Next race: 2017 Red Bull Air Race of Indianapolis
