= 2017 Red Bull Air Race of Indianapolis =

Coordinates: 39°47′54″N 86°13′58″W

Race Track (Indianapolis Motor Speedway)

The 2017 Red Bull Air Race of Indianapolis was the eighth round of the 2017 Red Bull Air Race World Championship, the twelfth season of the Red Bull Air Race World Championship. The event was held at the Indianapolis Motor Speedway, in Indianapolis, the United States.

== Master Class ==
=== Qualification ===
Pos	No.	Pilot	Run Time	Pen
1	95	(Australia) Matt Hall	1:04.149	
2	18	(Czech Republic) Petr Kopfstein	1:04.390	
3	26	(Spain) Juan Velarde	1:05.400	
4	8	(Czech Republic) Martin Sonka	1:05.463	
5	84	(Canada) Pete McLeod	1:05.464	
6	21	(Germany) Matthias Dolderer	1:05.926	
7	27	(France) Nicolas Ivanoff	1:05.965	
8	99	(United States) Michael Goulian	1:06.406	
9	37	(Slovenia) Peter Podlunsek	1:06.993	
10	11	(France) Mikael Brageot	1:07.211	
11	31	(Japan) Yoshihide Muroya	1:07.732	
12	10	(United States) Kirby Chambliss	1:07.754	
13	12	(France) Francois Le Vot	1:08.793	
14	5	(Chile) Cristian Bolton	1:09.270	

=== Round of 14 ===
Heat	Pilot One	Time One	Time Two	Pilot Two
1	(France) Mikael Brageot	1:06.752	1:09.598^2	(Canada) Pete McLeod
2	(Japan) Yoshihide Muroya	1:06.134 ^1	1:07.866 ^2	(Czech Republic) Martin Sonka
3	(Slovenia) Peter Podlunsek	1:14.083 ^3	1:06.131	(Germany) Matthias Dolderer
4	(United States) Kirby Chambliss	1:09.585 ^2	1:05.360	(Spain) Juan Velarde
5	(France) Nicolas Ivanoff	1:13.242 ^3	1:07.517	(United States) Michael Goulian
6	(France) Francois Le Vot	1:10.870	1:07.144	(Czech Republic) Petr Kopfstein
7	(Chile) Cristian Bolton	1:08.585	1:05.285	(Australia) Matt Hall

Key
Qualified for next round
Knocked out
Fastest loser, qualified

- ^1 +0:02
- ^2 +0:03
- ^3 +0:07

=== Round of 8 ===
Heat	Pilot One	Time One	Time Two	Pilot Two
8	(Japan) Yoshihide Muroya	1:04.557	1:07.126	(France) Mikael Brageot
9	(Germany) Matthias Dolderer	1:04.249	1:05.741	(Czech Republic) Petr Kopfstein
10	(United States) Michael Goulian	1:08.006 ^1	1:06.075	(Spain) Juan Velarde
11	(Czech Republic) Martin Sonka	1:04.995	1:11.359 ^2	(Australia) Matt Hall

Key
Qualified for next round
Knocked out

- ^1 +0:03
- ^2 +0:05

=== Final 4 ===
Pos	No.	Pilot	Run Time	Pen
1	31	(Japan) Yoshihide Muroya	1:03.026	
2	21	(Germany) Matthias Dolderer	1:05.546	
3	26	(Spain) Juan Velarde	1:05.829	
4	8	(Czech Republic) Martin Sonka	1:07.280	

=== Final result ===
Pos	Pilot	Points
1	(Japan) Yoshihide Muroya	15
2	(Germany) Matthias Dolderer	12
3	(Spain) Juan Velarde	9
4	(Czech Republic) Martin Sonka	7
5	(Czech Republic) Petr Kopfstein	6
6	(France) Mikael Brageot	5
7	(United States) Michael Goulian	4
8	(Australia) Matt Hall	3
9	(Chile) Cristian Bolton	2
10	(United States) Kirby Chambliss	1
11	(Canada) Pete McLeod	0
12	(France) Francois Le Vot	0
13	(France) Nicolas Ivanoff	0
14	(Slovenia) Peter Podlunsek	0

== Challenger Class ==
=== Qualification ===
Pos	No.	Pilot	Run Time	Pen
1	33	(France) Mélanie Astles	1:18.059	
2	6	(Poland) Luke Czepiela	1:18.378	
3	24	(United Kingdom) Ben Murphy	1:18.477	
4	62	(Germany) Florian Berger	1:18.586	
5	48	(United States) Kevin Coleman	1:20.402	
6	17	(Sweden) Daniel Ryfa	1:21.408	

The final game was canceled due to bad weather. The players were given half the usual points according to the preliminary ranking.

== Standings after the event ==
Master Class standings

Pos	Pilot	Pts
1	(Japan) Yoshihide Muroya	74
2	(Czech Republic) Martin Sonka	70
3	(Canada) Pete McLeod	56
4	(United States) Kirby Chambliss	53
5	(Czech Republic) Petr Kopfstein	43
6	(Australia) Matt Hall	40
7	(Germany) Matthias Dolderer	39
8	(Spain) Juan Velarde	37
9	(United States) Michael Goulian	28
10	(France) Mikael Brageot	24
11	(France) Nicolas Ivanoff	16
12	(Slovenia) Peter Podlunsek	14
13	(Chile) Cristian Bolton	9
14	(France) Francois Le Vot	9

Challenger Class standings

Pos	Pilot	Pts
1	(Germany) Florian Berger	38
2	(Sweden) Daniel Ryfa	34
3	(Poland) Luke Czepiela	34
4	(United States) Kevin Coleman	27
5	(France) Mélanie Astles	23
6	(United Kingdom) Ben Murphy	19
7	(France) Baptiste Vignes	14
8	(China) Kenny Chiang	12
9	(Hungary) Daniel Genevey	12

Previous race: 2017 Red Bull Air Race of Lausitz	Red Bull Air Race; 2017 season	Next race: 2018 Red Bull Air Race of Abu Dhabi
Previous race: 2016 Red Bull Air Race of Indianapolis	Red Bull Air Race of Indianapolis	Next race: 2018 Red Bull Air Race of Indianapolis
