= 2017 Red Bull Air Race of Chiba =

Coordinates: 35°38′23″N 140°01′55″E

Race Track

The 2017 Red Bull Air Race of Chiba was the third round of the 2017 season, the eleventh season of the Red Bull Air Race World Championship. The event was held in Chiba, Japan.

== Overview ==
On January 19, 2017, 8 cities hosting the 2017 season were announced, and following the 2015 season and the 2016 season, it was decided to hold for the third consecutive and the third time in Japan and Chiba prefecture.

Following Abu Dhabi of the first game and San Diego of the second game, Chiba of the third game is also a maritime race.

Glay will serve as the ambassador of this event. Also, Glay also wrote the theme song "XYZ".

=== Schedule ===
- 2017
  - January 19 – the schedule is announced.
  - June 3 – First day of the convention. Qualifying day.
  Opening 10: 00, Competition start 13:00, Competition end 16: 00
  - June 4 – Day 2 of the tournament. Final day.
  Opening 10: 00, Competition start 13:00, Competition end 16: 00

It will be carried out even in case of rain, but it will be canceled in the case of stormy weather. Also, we will not carry forward the tournament.

== Master Class ==
=== Qualification ===
| Pos | No. | Pilot | Run Time | Pen |
|---|---|---|---|---|
| 1 | 84 | (Canada) Pete McLeod | 54.609 | |
| 2 | 21 | (Germany) Matthias Dolderer | 54.656 | |
| 3 | 8 | (Czech Republic) Martin Sonka | 54.928 | |
| 4 | 31 | (Japan) Yoshihide Muroya | 54.933 | |
| 5 | 95 | (Australia) Matt Hall | 55.010 | |
| 6 | 10 | (United States) Kirby Chambliss | 55.226 | |
| 7 | 99 | (United States) Michael Goulian | 55.539 | |
| 8 | 37 | (Slovenia) Peter Podlunsek | 55.605 | |
| 9 | 26 | (Spain) Juan Velarde | 55.632 | |
| 10 | 27 | (France) Nicolas Ivanoff | 55.791 | |
| 11 | 18 | (Czech Republic) Petr Kopfstein | 55.954 | |
| 12 | 11 | (France) Mikael Brageot | 56.169 | |
| 13 | 5 | (Chile) Cristian Bolton | 56.365 | |
| 14 | 12 | (France) Francois Le Vot | 57.116 | |

=== Round of 14 ===
| Heat | Rank1 | Pilot One | Time One | Time Two | Pilot Two | Rank2 |
|---|---|---|---|---|---|---|
| 1 | 13 | (France) Nicolas Ivanoff | 58.057^{1} | 55.459 | (Australia) Matt Hall | 4 |
| 2 | 6 | (Czech Republic) Petr Kopfstein | 55.597 | 55.590 | (Japan) Yoshihide Muroya | 5 |
| 3 | 10 | (Spain) Juan Velarde | 57.012 | 55.234 | (United States) Kirby Chambliss | 3 |
| 4 | 9 | (France) Mikael Brageot | 56.037 | 54.787 | (Czech Republic) Martin Sonka | 1 |
| 5 | 12 | (Slovenia) Peter Podlunsek | 58.008^{2} | 56.380 | (United States) Michael Goulian | 8 |
| 6 | 14 | (Chile) Cristian Bolton | 59.044 | 55.805 | (Germany) Matthias Dolderer | 7 |
| 7 | 11 | (France) Francois Le Vot | 57.331 | 55.209 | (Canada) Pete McLeod | 2 |

Key
Qualified for next round
Knocked out
Fastest loser, qualified

- ^1 Pilot received 2 seconds in climbing in the gate
- ^2 Pilot received 2 seconds in incorrect level flying

=== Round of 8 ===
| Heat | Rank1 | Pilot One | Time One | Time Two | Pilot Two | Rank2 |
|---|---|---|---|---|---|---|
| 8 | 4 | (Japan) Yoshihide Muroya | 56.964^{1} | 57.295^{2} | (Australia) Matt Hall | 6 |
| 9 | 3 | (Czech Republic) Petr Kopfstein | 55.732 | DNF^{3} | (United States) Kirby Chambliss | 8 |
| 10 | 2 | (Germany) Matthias Dolderer | 55.333 | DNF^{3} | (Canada) Pete McLeod | 7 |
| 11 | 5 | (United States) Michael Goulian | 55.018 | 54.900 | (Czech Republic) Martin Sonka | 1 |

Key
Qualified for next round
Knocked out

- ^1 Pilot received 2 seconds in incorrect level flying
- ^2 Pilot received 2 seconds in climbing in the gate
- ^3 DNF in exceeding maximum g

=== Final 4 ===
| Pos | No. | Pilot | Run Time | Pen |
|---|---|---|---|---|
| 1 | 31 | (Japan) Yoshihide Muroya | 55.288 | |
| 2 | 18 | (Czech Republic) Petr Kopfstein | 55.846 | |
| 3 | 8 | (Czech Republic) Martin Sonka | 56.533 | +2sec^{1} |
| 4 | 21 | (Germany) Matthias Dolderer | 57.943 | +3sec^{2} |

- ^1 Pilot received 2 in incorrect level flying
- ^2 Pilot received 3 in penalties

== Standings after the event ==
Master Class standings

| Pos | Pilot | Pts |
|---|---|---|
| 1 | (Japan) Yoshihide Muroya | 30 |
| 2 | (Czech Republic) Martin Sonka | 30 |
| 3 | (Germany) Matthias Dolderer | 23 |
| 4 | (Czech Republic) Petr Kopfstein | 17 |
| 5 | (Canada) Pete McLeod | 14 |
| 6 | (United States) Michael Goulian | 14 |
| 7 | (Spain) Juan Velarde | 13 |
| 8 | (Slovenia) Peter Podlunsek | 12 |
| 9 | (United States) Kirby Chambliss | 10 |
| 10 | (France) Nicolas Ivanoff | 10 |
| 11 | (Australia) Matt Hall | 8 |
| 12 | (Chile) Cristian Bolton | 4 |
| 13 | (France) Mikael Brageot | 4 |
| 14 | (France) Francois Le Vot | 3 |

== Gallery ==
Facility

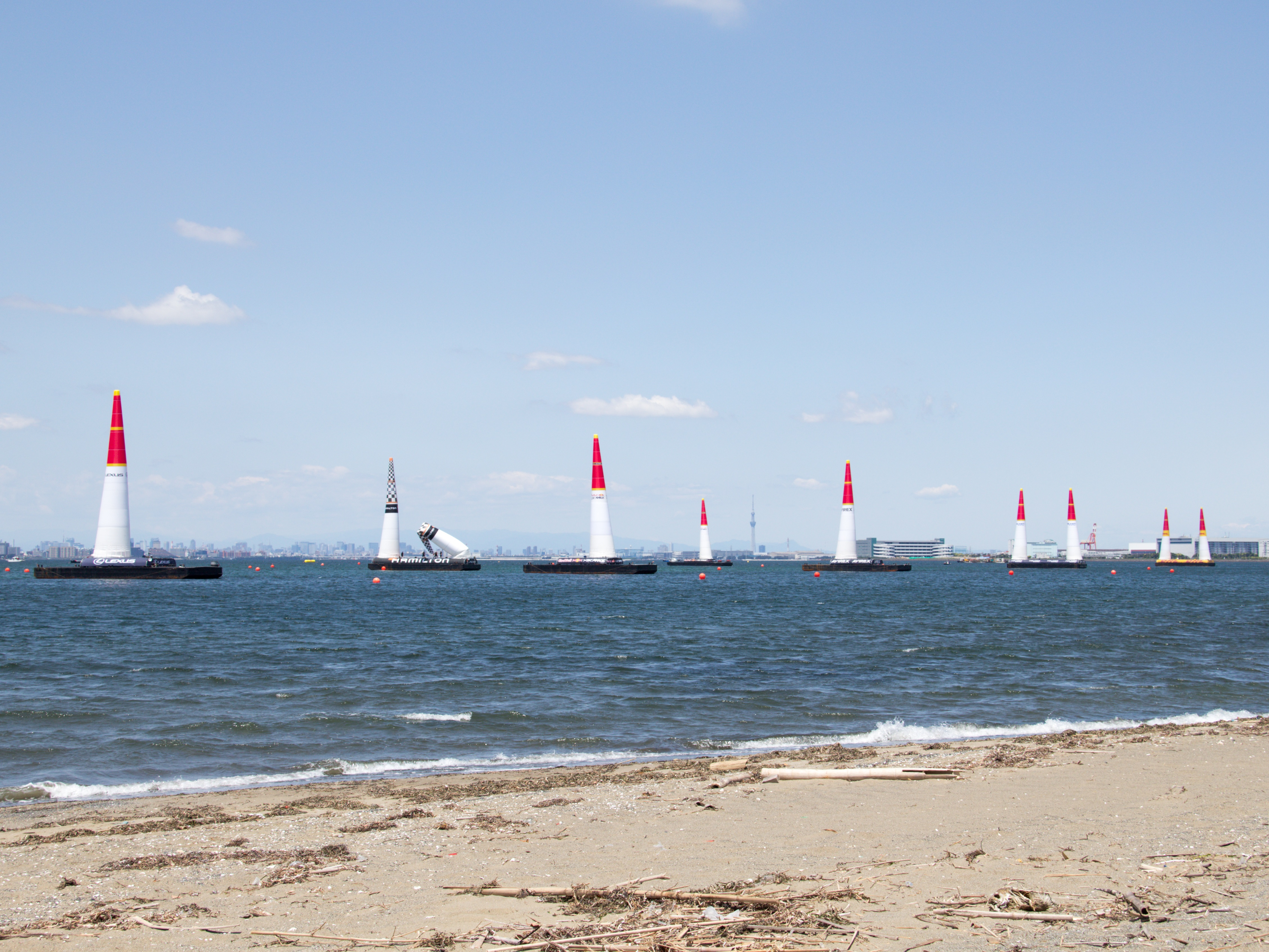
Race Track

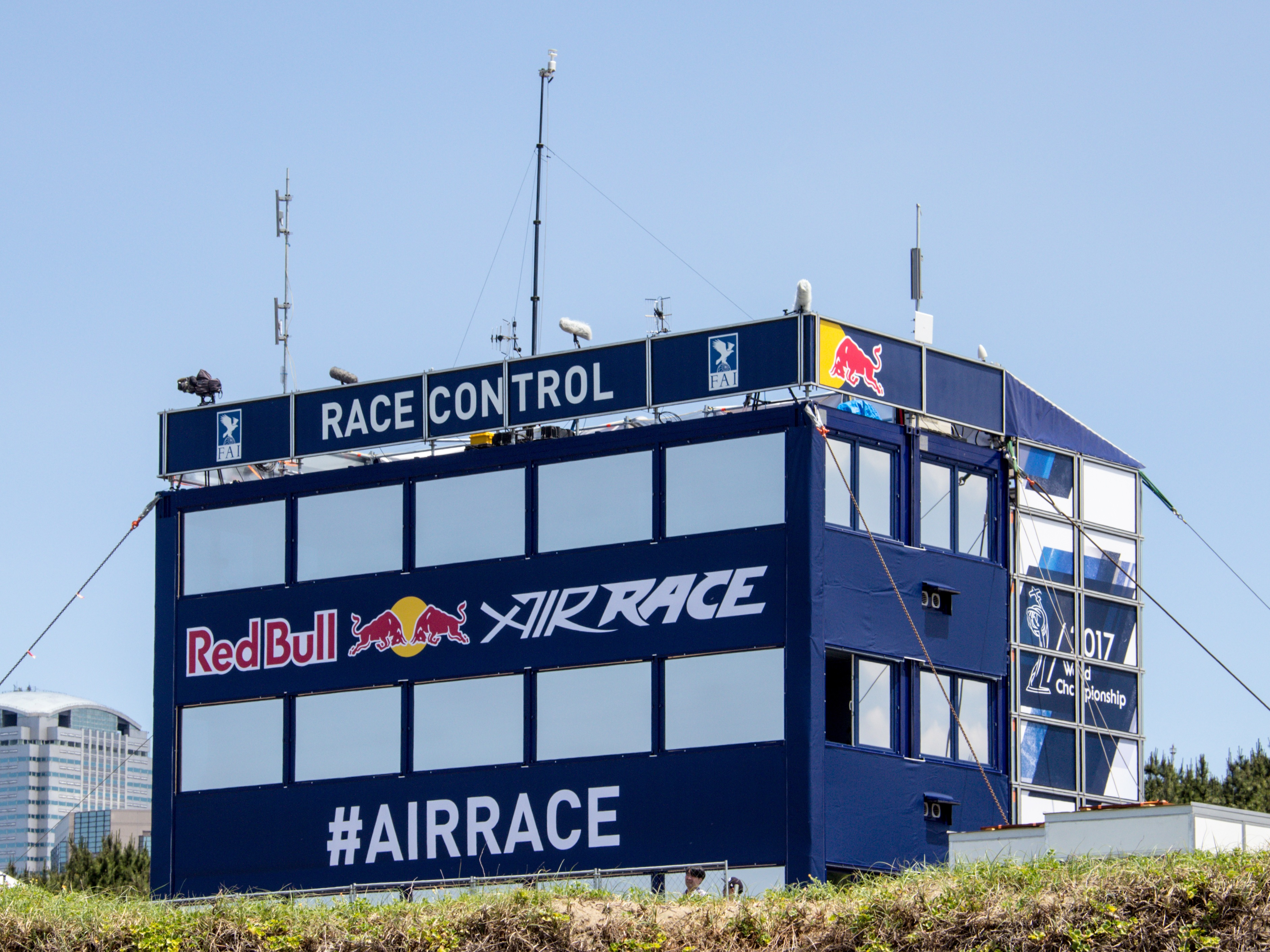
Race Control

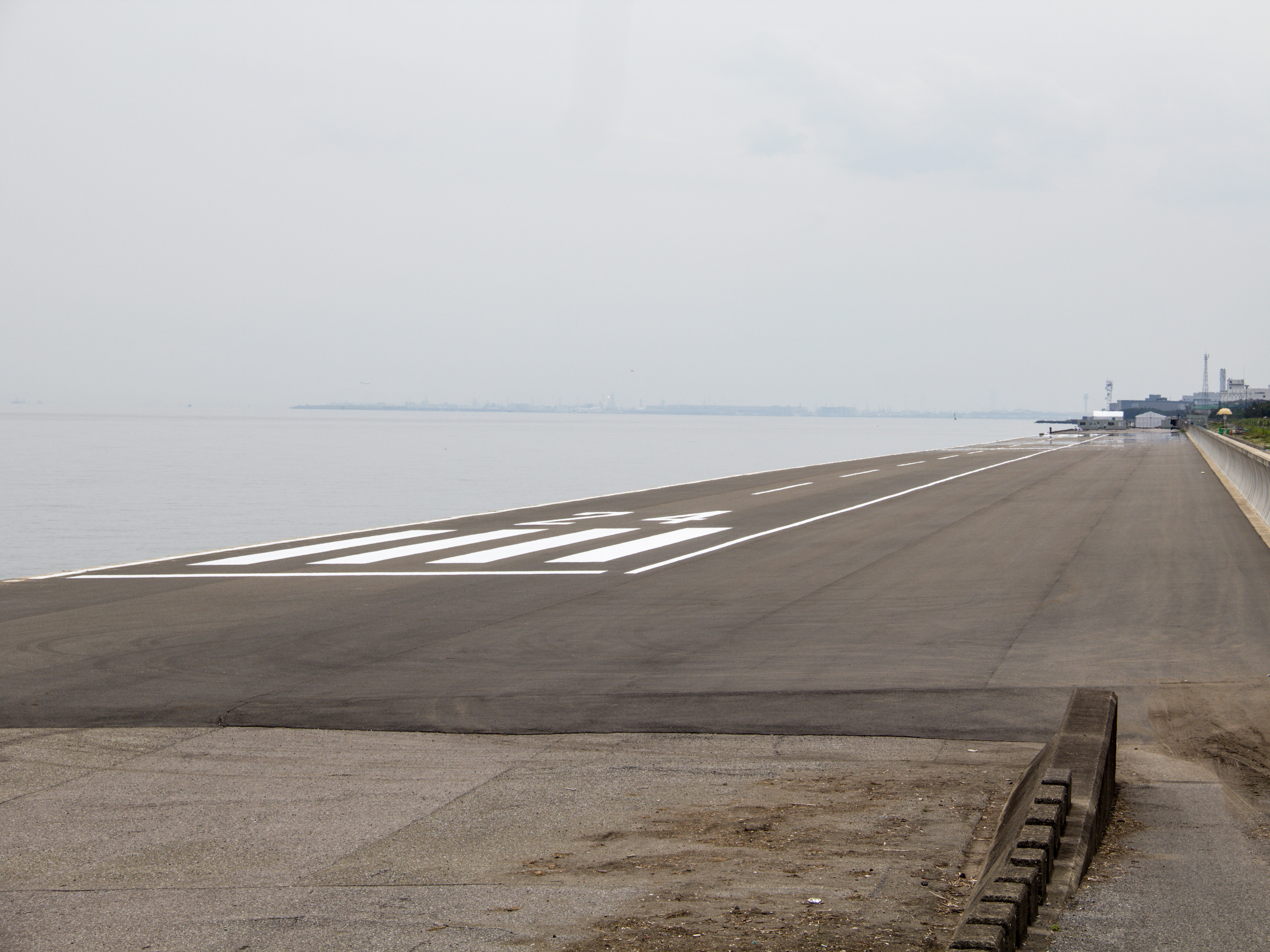
Runway

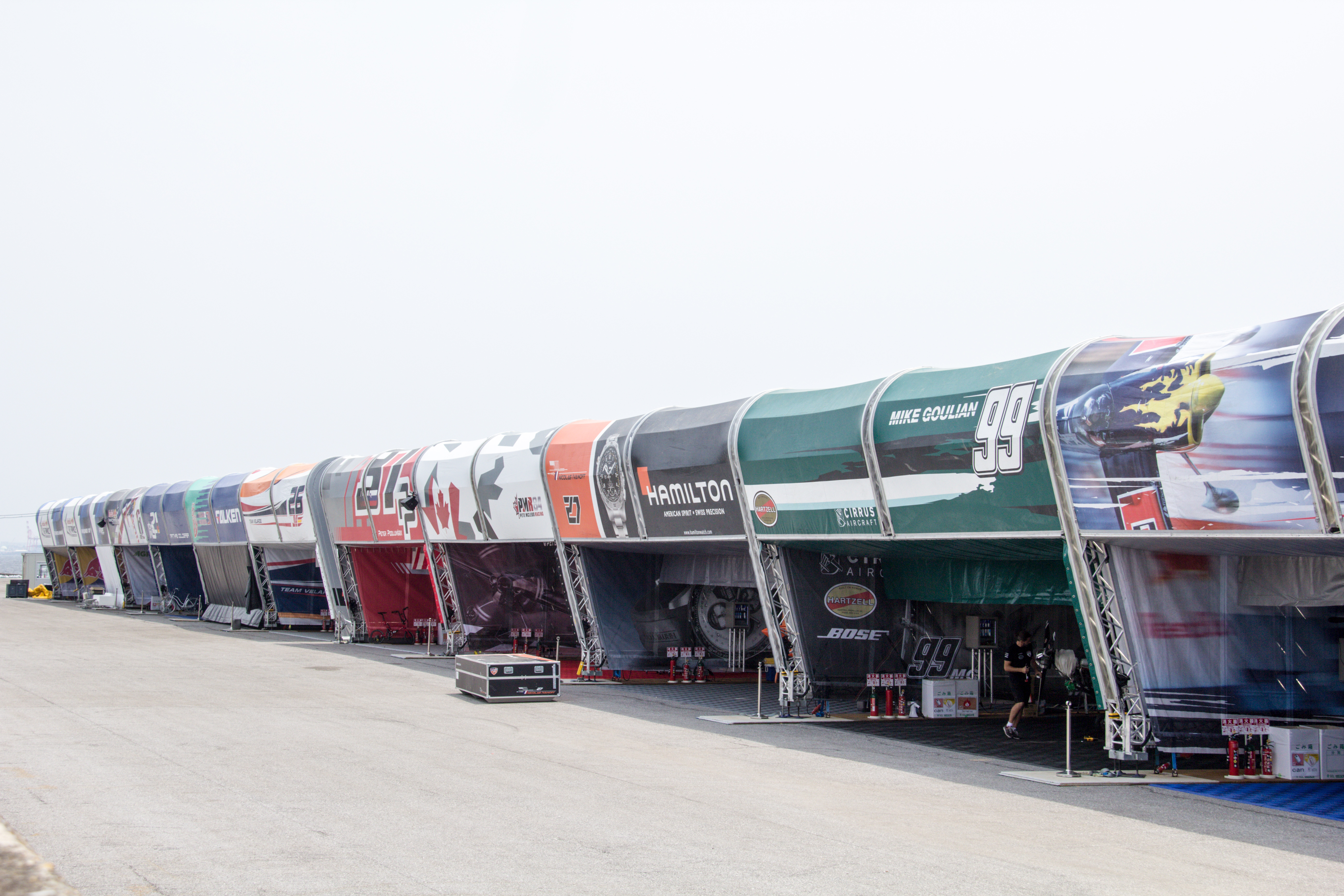
Hangar

Sideact

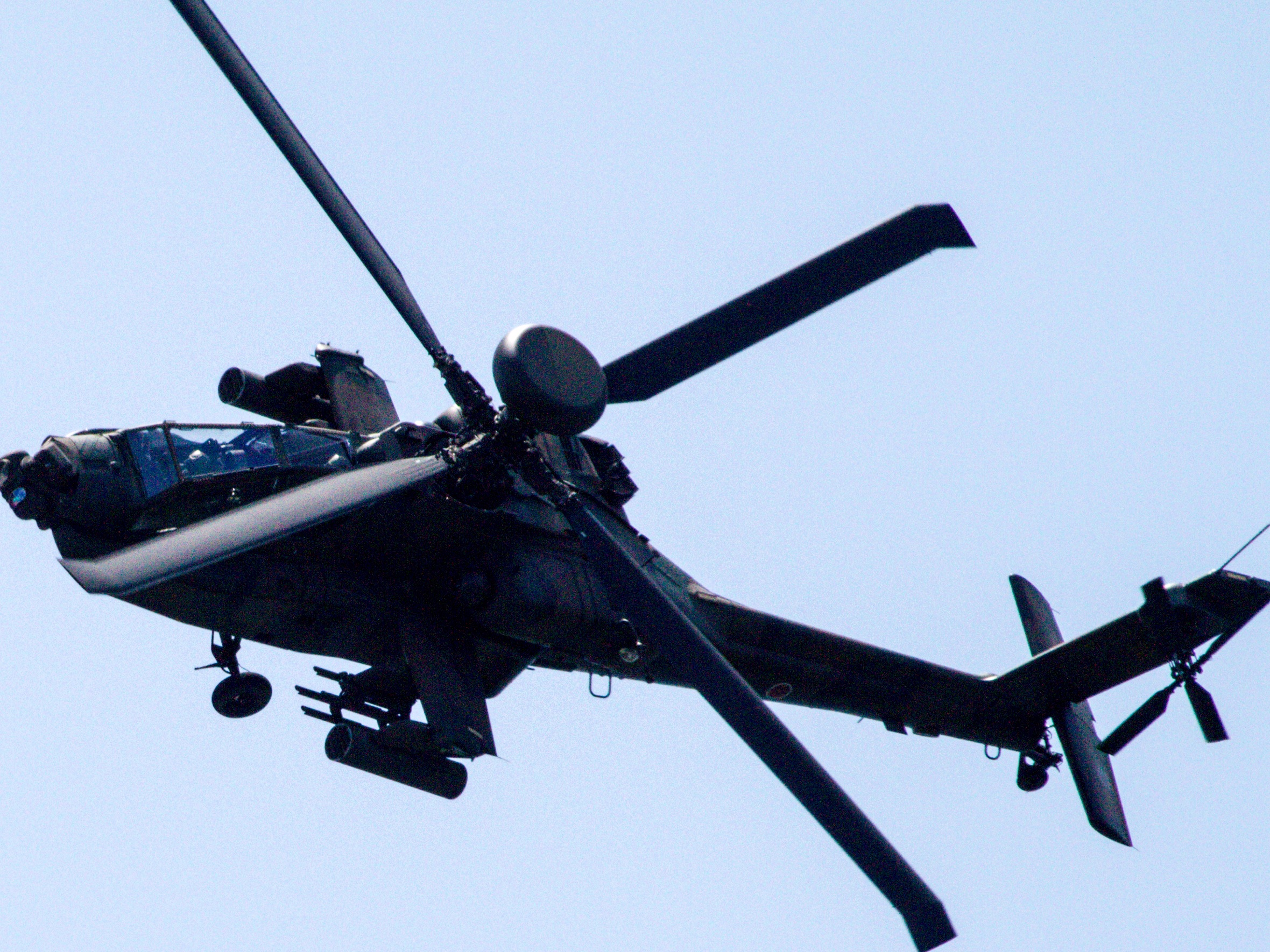
JGSDF AH-64D

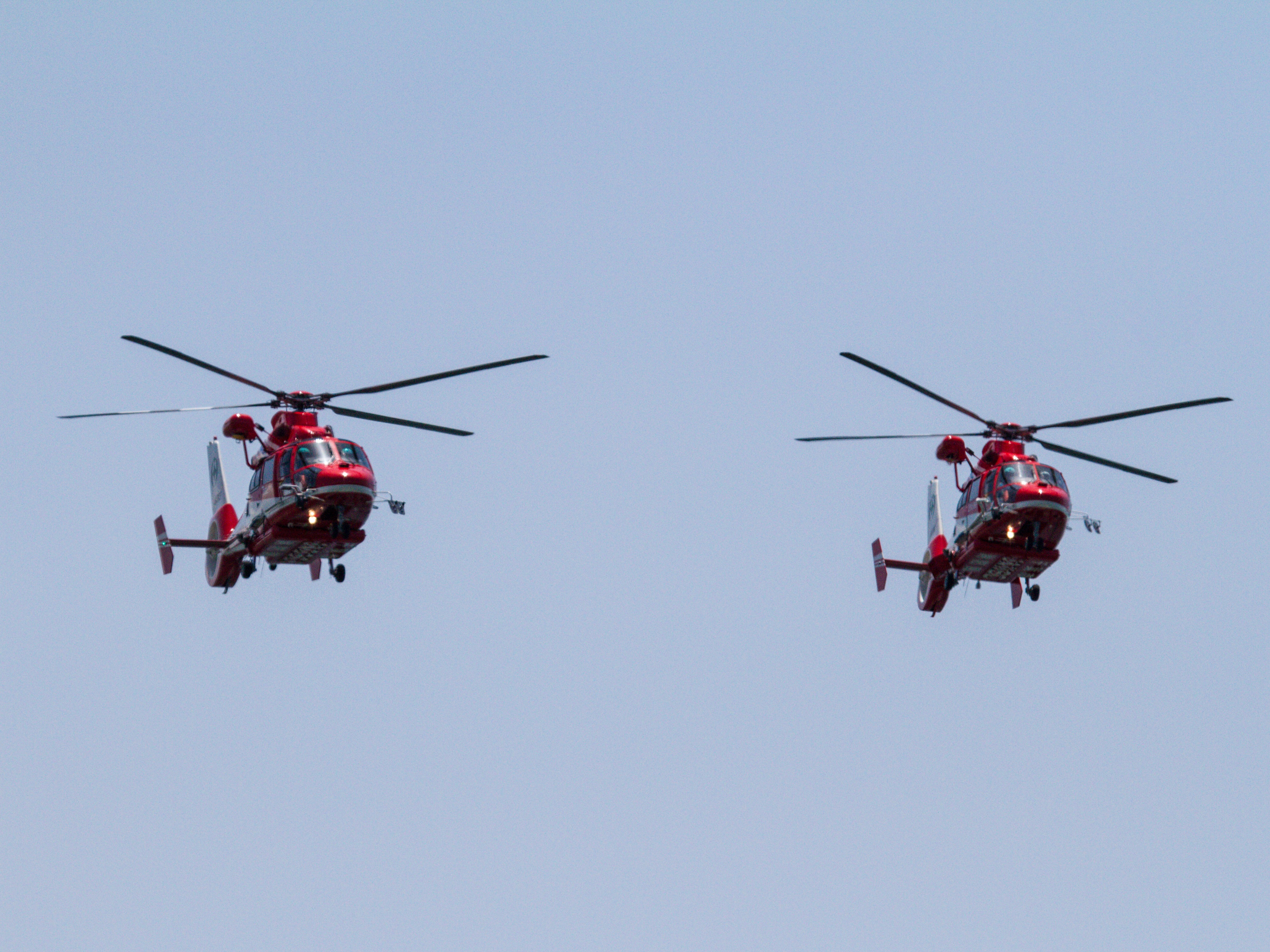
Chiba Fire Rescue Demonstration

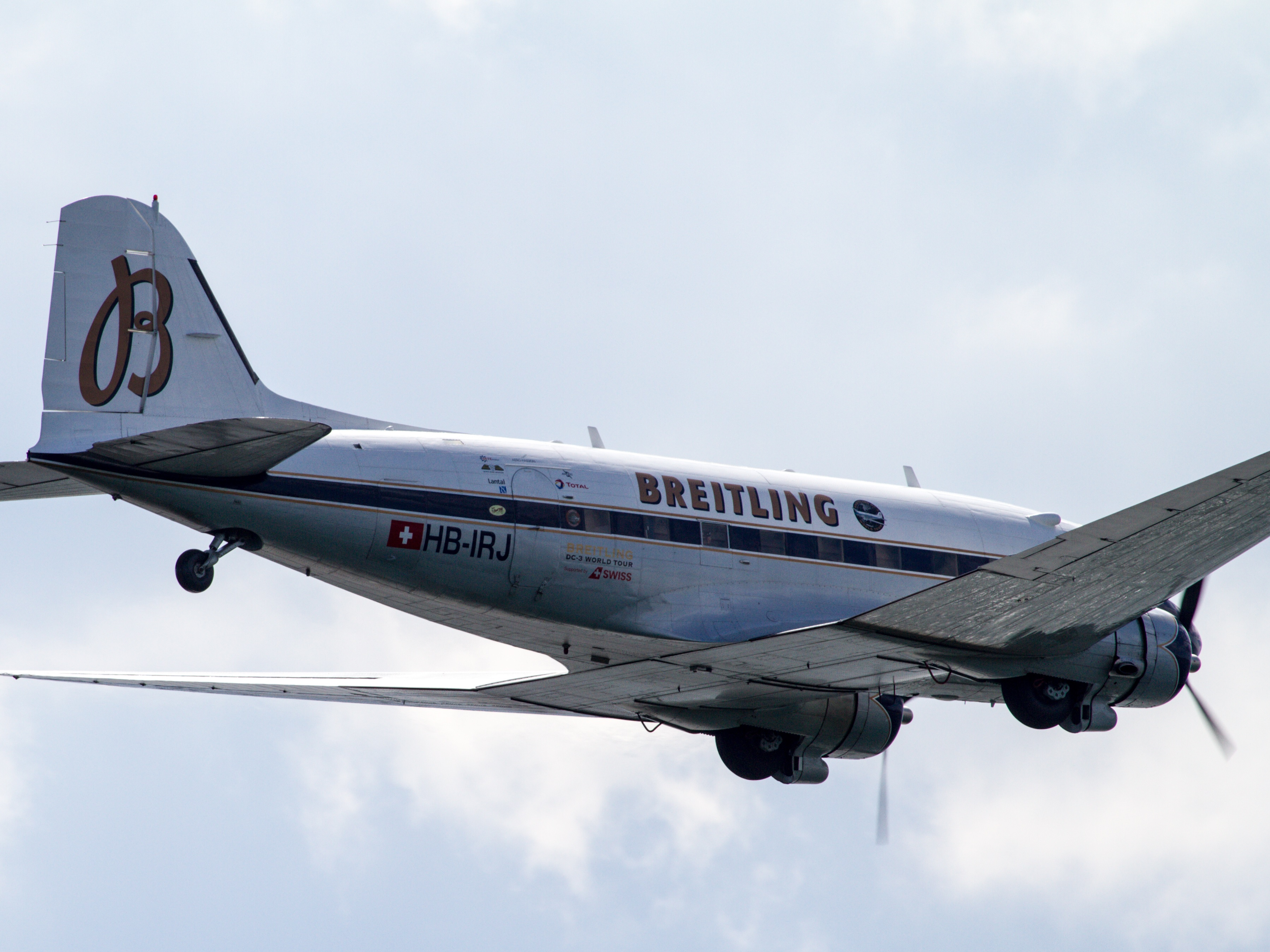
Breitling DC-3 HB-IRJ

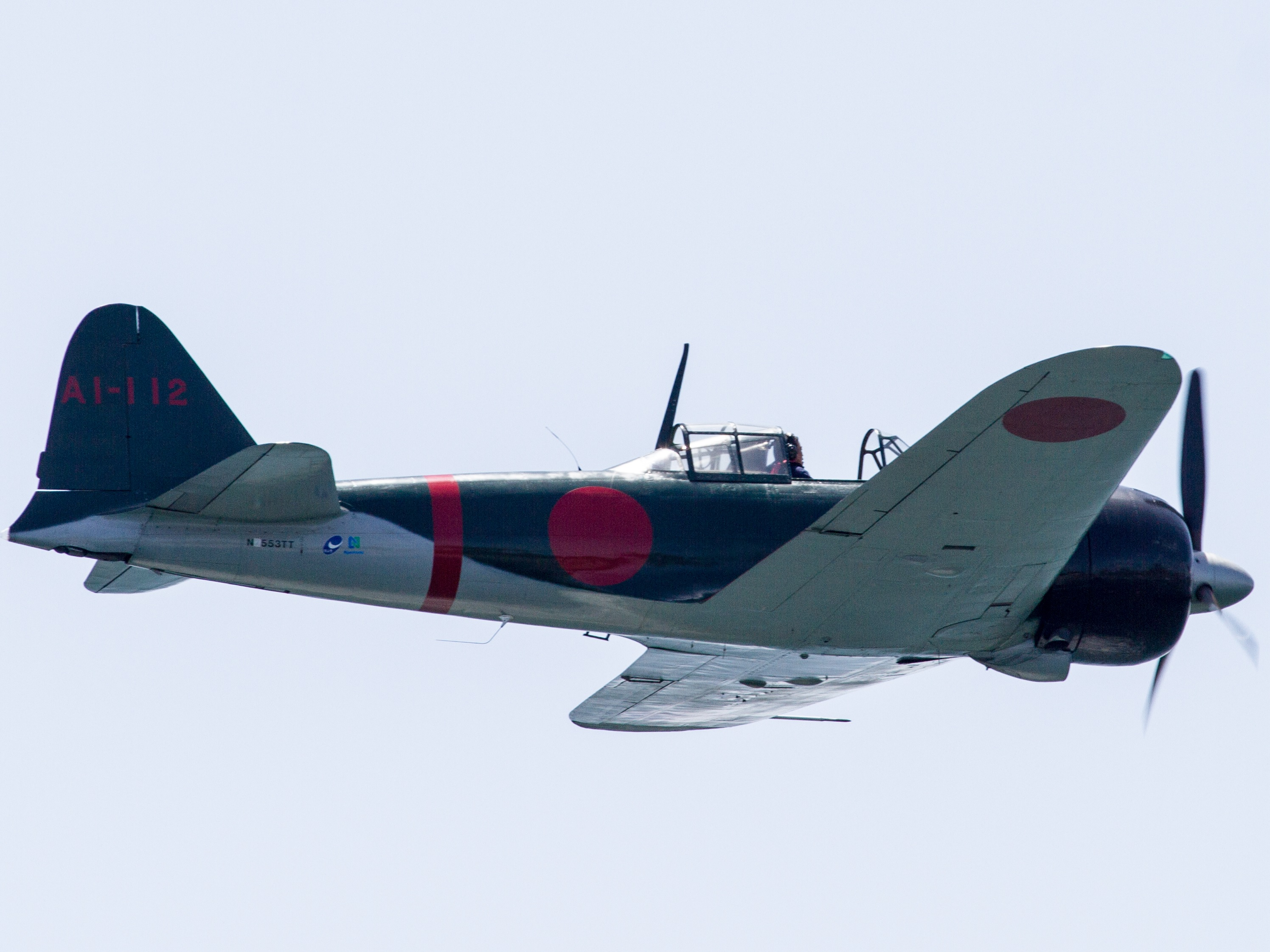
Zero N553TT

Airplane

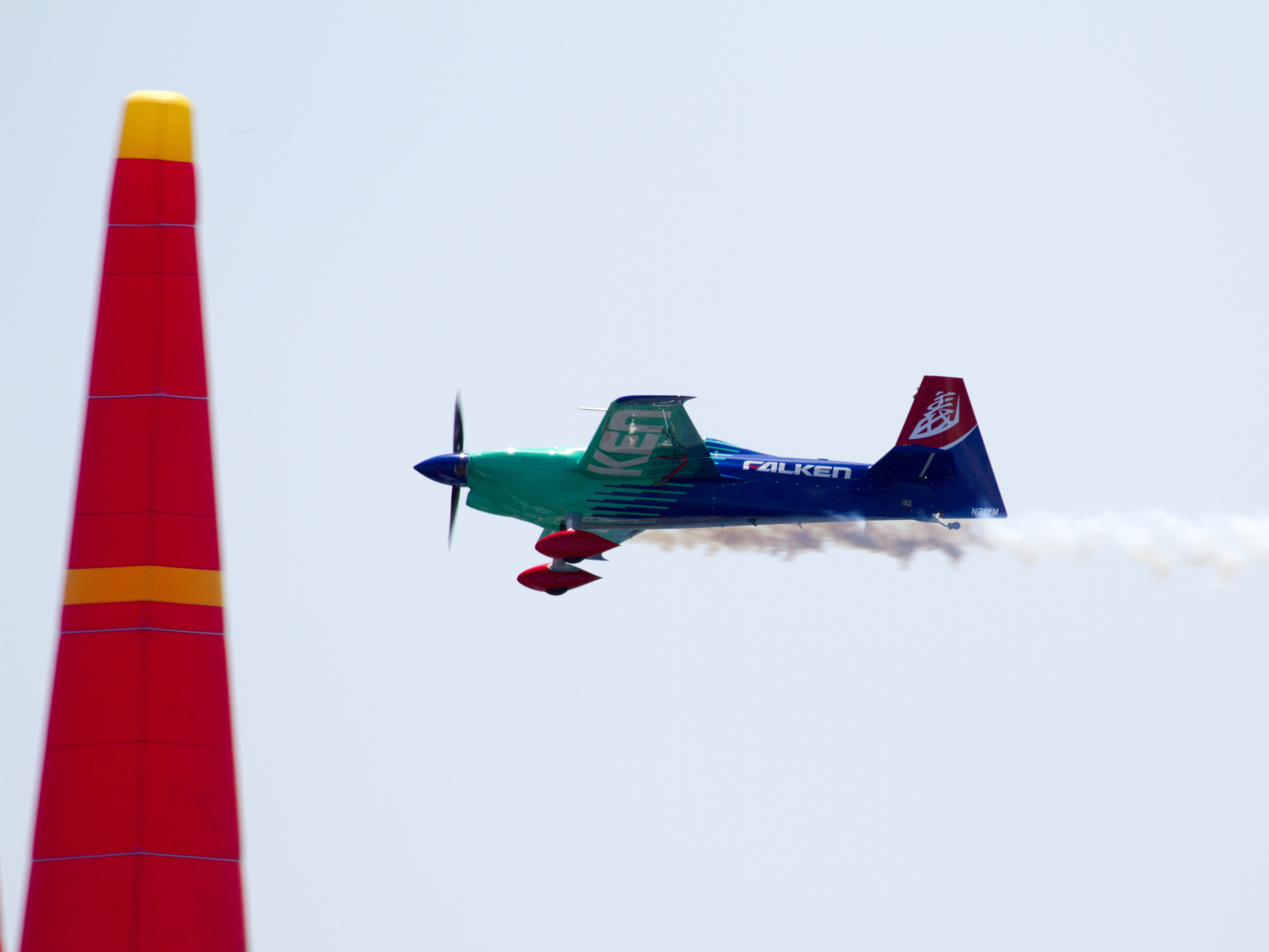
Yoshihide Muroya (N31YM)

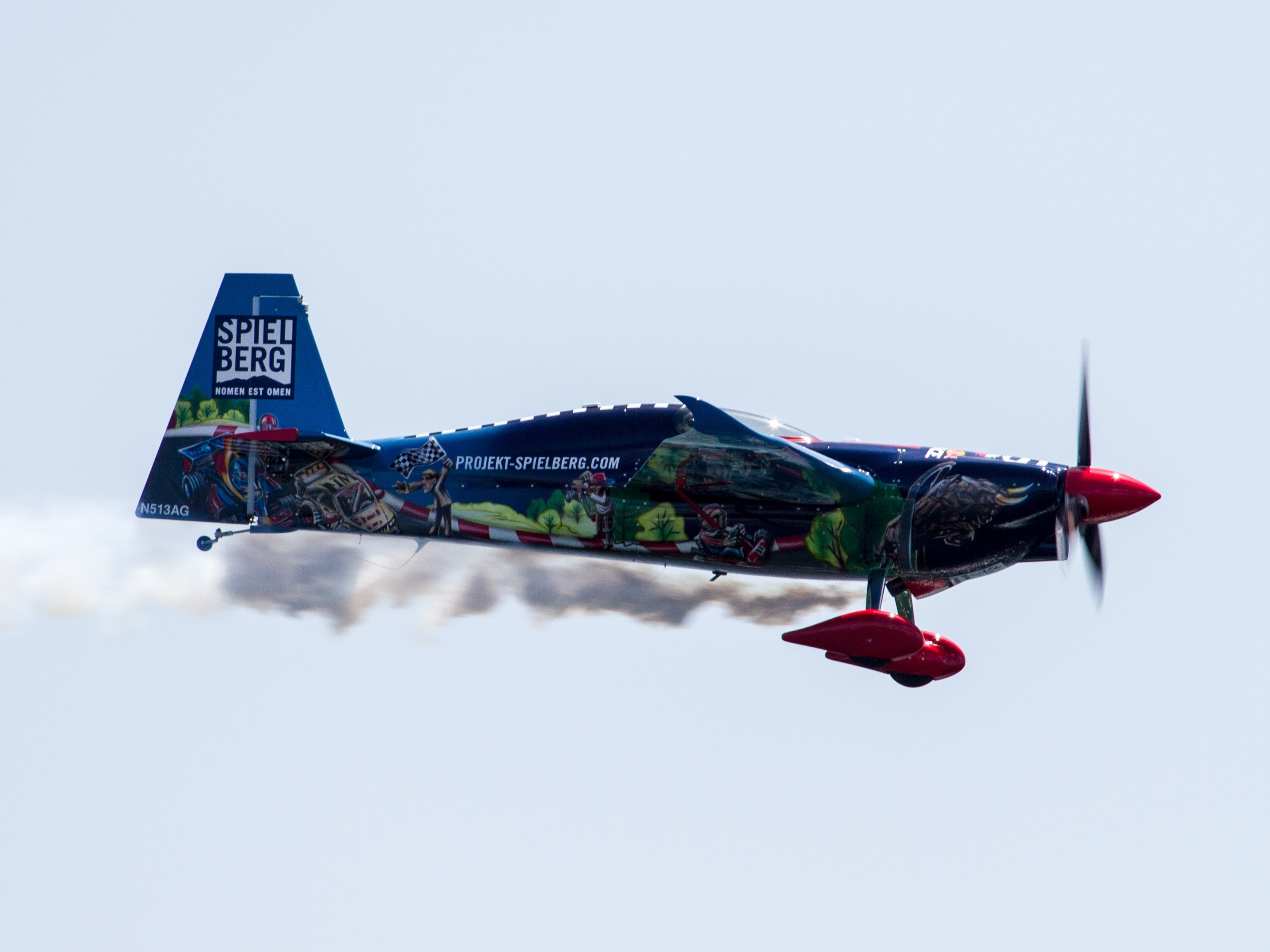
Petr Kopfstein (N513AG)

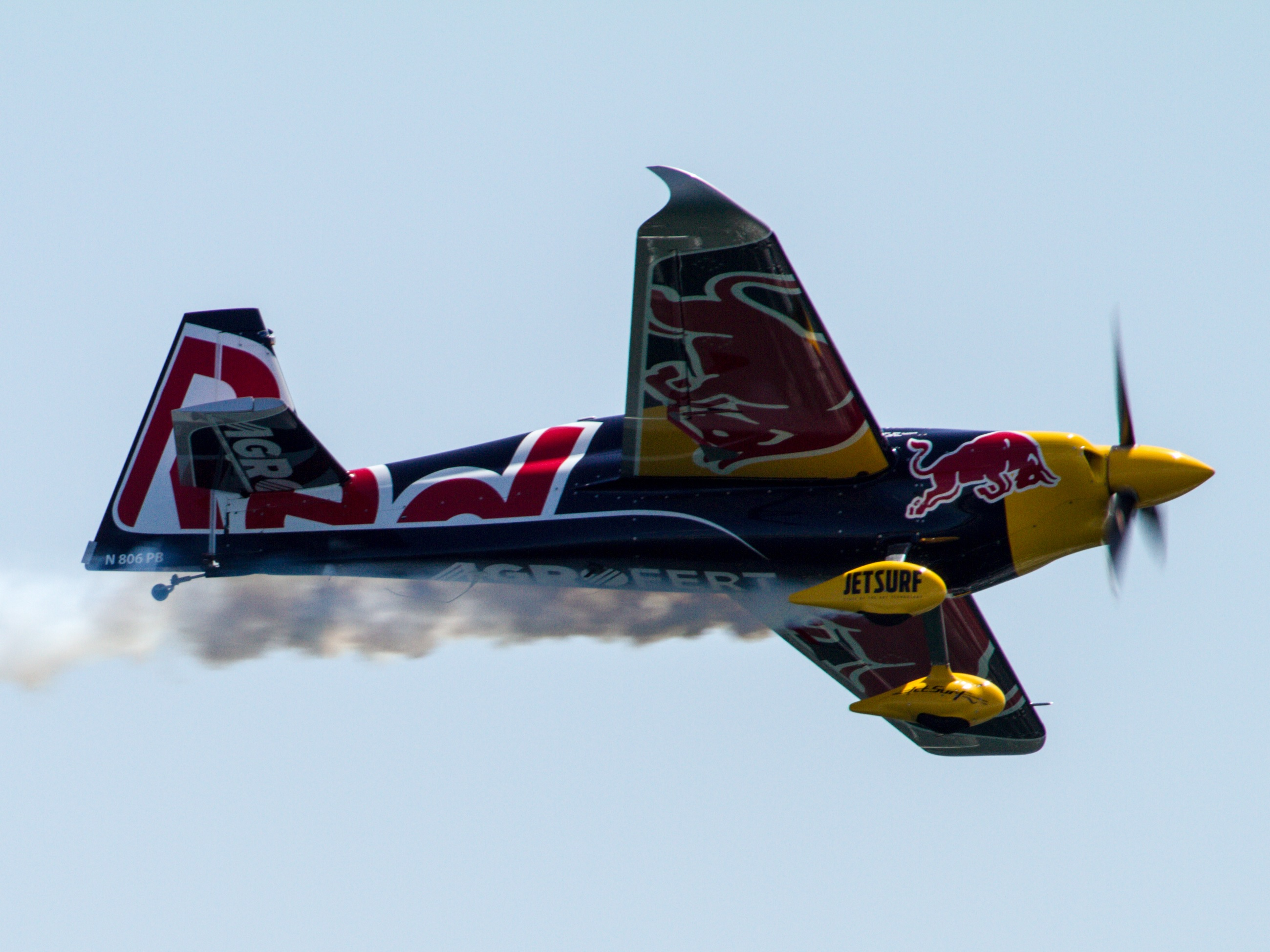
Martin Sonka (N806PB)

| Previous race: 2017 Red Bull Air Race of San Diego | Red Bull Air Race; 2017 season | Next race: 2017 Red Bull Air Race of Budapest |
| Previous race: 2016 Red Bull Air Race of Chiba | Red Bull Air Race of Chiba | Next race: 2018 Red Bull Air Race of Chiba |
