= 2017 Red Bull Air Race World Championship =

Championship season

Location

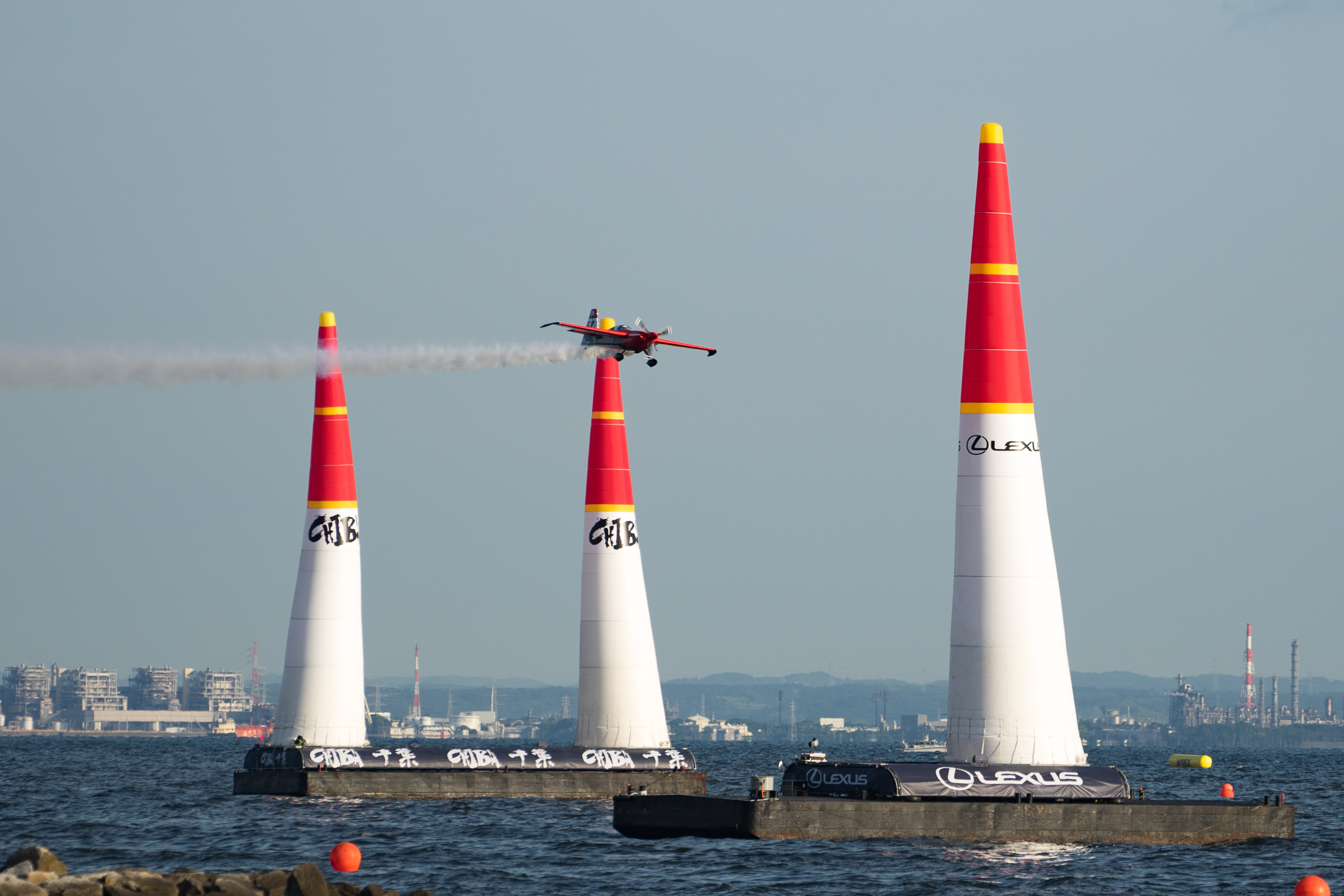
Peter Podlunšek at 2017 Red Bull Air Race of Chiba.

The 2017 Red Bull Air Race World Championship was the twelfth Red Bull Air Race World Championship series.

== Aircraft and pilots ==
=== Master Class ===
No.	Pilot	Aircraft	Rounds
5	(Chile) Cristian Bolton	Zivko Edge 540	All
8	(Czech Republic) Martin Šonka	Zivko Edge 540	All
10	(United States) Kirby Chambliss	Zivko Edge 540	All
11	(France) Mikaël Brageot	MX Aircraft MXS	All
12	(France) François Le Vot	Zivko Edge 540	All
18	(Czech Republic) Petr Kopfstein	Zivko Edge 540	All
21	(Germany) Matthias Dolderer	Zivko Edge 540	All
26	(Spain) Juan Velarde	Zivko Edge 540	All
27	(France) Nicolas Ivanoff	Zivko Edge 540	All
31	(Japan) Yoshihide Muroya	Zivko Edge 540	All
37	(Slovenia) Peter Podlunšek	Zivko Edge 540	All
84	(Canada) Pete McLeod	Zivko Edge 540	All
95	(Australia) Matt Hall	Zivko Edge 540	All
99	(United States) Michael Goulian	Zivko Edge 540	All

Pilot changes

- Former champion Nigel Lamb retired from the sport following the final round of the 2016 season.
- 2015 Challenger Class champion Mikaël Brageot made his debut in the Master Class.

=== Challenger Class ===
- All Challenger Cup Pilots used an Extra 330LX.

No.	Pilot	Rounds
6	(Poland) Luke Czepiela	1–4, 7–8
7	(China) Kenny Chiang	2–6
15	(France) Baptiste Vignes	1–5
17	(Sweden) Daniel Ryfa	1, 3–5, 7–8
24	(United Kingdom) Ben Murphy	1, 4–8
33	(France) Mélanie Astles	1, 4–8
48	(United States) Kevin Coleman	1–3, 5–6, 8
62	(Germany) Florian Bergér	1–3, 6–8
78	(Hungary) Daniel Genevey	2–4, 6–7

== Race calendar and results ==
On 16 December 2016, it was announced that the first round in the Arabian Gulf, Abu Dhabi will be held on 10-11 February. Other rounds were announced on 19 January 2017, with the final two European rounds announced on 8 March 2017. Due to organisational reasons, the Challenger round in Chiba was later rescheduled to Kazan, making it a double-header round for the class.

Round	Country	Location	Date	Fastest Qualifying	Winning Pilot	Winning Aircraft	Winning Challenger	Report
1	United Arab Emirates	Abu Dhabi, Abu Dhabi	11–12 February	(Czech Republic) Martin Šonka	(Czech Republic) Martin Šonka	Zivko Edge 540	(Sweden) Daniel Ryfa	report
2	United States	San Diego, California	15–16 April	(Germany) Matthias Dolderer	(Japan) Yoshihide Muroya	Zivko Edge 540	(Germany) Florian Bergér	report
3	Japan	Makuhari, Chiba	3–4 June	(Canada) Pete McLeod	(Japan) Yoshihide Muroya	Zivko Edge 540	rescheduled	report
4	Hungary	Budapest, Central Hungary	1–2 July	(Canada) Pete McLeod	(United States) Kirby Chambliss	Zivko Edge 540	(Germany) Florian Bergér	report
5	Russia	Kazan, Tatarstan	22–23 July	(Canada) Pete McLeod	(United States) Kirby Chambliss	Zivko Edge 540	R1: (Poland) Luke Czepiela; R2: (China) Kenny Chiang	report
6	Portugal	River Douro, Porto	2–3 September	(Canada) Pete McLeod	(Czech Republic) Martin Šonka	Zivko Edge 540	(United States) Kevin Coleman	report
7	Germany	Lausitzring, Klettwitz	16–17 September	(Australia) Matt Hall	(Japan) Yoshihide Muroya	Zivko Edge 540	(Sweden) Daniel Ryfa	report
8	United States	Indianapolis Motor Speedway, Indiana	14–15 October	(Australia) Matt Hall	(Japan) Yoshihide Muroya	Zivko Edge 540	(France) Mélanie Astles	report

== Championship standings ==
=== Master Class ===
Master Class scoring system

Position	**1st**	**2nd**	**3rd**	**4th**	**5th**	**6th**	**7th**	**8th**	**9th**	**10th**	**11–14th**
Points	15	12	9	7	6	5	4	3	2	1	0

Pos.	Pilot	ABU (United Arab Emirates)	SDG (United States)	CHI (Japan)	BUD (Hungary)	KAZ (Russia)	POR (Portugal)	LAU (Germany)	IND (United States)	Points
1	(Japan) Yoshihide Muroya	13	1	1	3	13	6	1	1	74
2	(Czech Republic) Martin Šonka	**1**	5	3	4	9	1	3	4	70
3	(Canada) Pete McLeod	3	10	**7**	**2**	**2**	**2**	5	11	56
4	(United States) Kirby Chambliss	11	4	8	1	1	4	6	10	53
5	(Czech Republic) Petr Kopfstein	12	6	2	5	4	7	8	5	43
6	(Australia) Matt Hall	10	9	6	8	6	3	**2**	**8**	40
7	(Germany) Matthias Dolderer	4	**3**	4	12	10	8	12	2	39
8	(Spain) Juan Velarde	2	11	10	9	5	DNS	4	3	37
9	(United States) Michael Goulian	6	8	5	13	3	10	14	7	28
10	(France) Mikaël Brageot	9	13	9	6	12	5	7	6	24
11	(France) Nicolas Ivanoff	5	7	13	7	11	11	9	13	16
12	(Slovenia) Peter Podlunšek	DSQ	2	12	DNS	14	9	13	14	14
13	(Chile) Cristian Bolton	7	14	14	11	8	12	11	9	9
14	(France) François Le Vot	8	12	11	10	7	13	10	12	9
Pos.	Pilot	ABU (United Arab Emirates)	SDG (United States)	CHI (Japan)	BUD (Hungary)	KAZ (Russia)	POR (Portugal)	LAU (Germany)	IND (United States)	Points

Colour	Result
Gold	Winner
Silver	Second place
Bronze	Third place
Green	Points finish
Blue	Non-points finish
Blue	Non-classified finish (NC)
Purple	Retired (Ret)
Red	Did not qualify (DNQ)
Red	Did not pre-qualify (DNPQ)
Black	Disqualified (DSQ)
White	Did not start (DNS)
White	Withdrew (WD)
White	Race cancelled (C)
Blank	Did not practice (DNP)
Blank	Did not arrive (DNA)
Blank	Excluded (EX)

**Bold** – Fastest Qualifying Pilot

=== Challenger Class ===
Challenger Class scoring system

Position	**1st**	**2nd**	**3rd**	**4th**	**5th**	**6-8th**
Points	10	8	6	4	2	0

Pos.	Pilot	ABU (United Arab Emirates)	SDG (United States)	BUD (Hungary)	KAZ (Russia)	KAZ (Russia)	POR (Portugal)	LAU (Germany)	IND (United States)	Drop	Points
1	(Germany) Florian Bergér	2	1	1			2	2	4	8	38
2	(Sweden) Daniel Ryfa	1		3	2	6		1	6		34
3	(Poland) Luke Czepiela	6	3	2	1			3	2		34
4	(United States) Kevin Coleman	5	2		7	3	1		5		27
5	(France) Mélanie Astles	3			5	4	3	5	1	2	23
6	(United Kingdom) Ben Murphy	4			3	5	5	4	3	2	19
7	(France) Baptiste Vignes	7	5	4	6	2					14
8	(China) Kenny Chiang		6	5	DSQ	1	6				12
9	(Hungary) Daniel Genevey		4	6	4		4	6			12
Pos.	Pilot	ABU (United Arab Emirates)	SDG (United States)	BUD (Hungary)	KAZ (Russia)	KAZ (Russia)	POR (Portugal)	LAU (Germany)	IND (United States)	Drop	Points
