= 2017 Red Bull Air Race of Kazan =

Coordinates: 55°47′53″N 49°05′34″E

Race Track

The 2017 Red Bull Air Race of Kazan was the fifth round of the 2017 Red Bull Air Race World Championship season, the eleventh season of the Red Bull Air Race World Championship. The event was held on Kazanka River in Kazan, Tatarstan, Russia. It was the first non-cancelled race taking place in Russia.

== Master class ==
=== Qualification ===
Pos	No.	Pilot	Run Time	Pen
1	84	(Canada) Pete McLeod	0:54.562	
2	8	(Czech Republic) Martin Sonka	0:56.339	
3	9	(France) Nicolas Ivanoff	0:56.450	
4	10	(United States) Kirby Chambliss	0:56.703	
5	99	(United States) Michael Goulian	0:56.837	
6	95	(Australia) Matt Hall	0:57.068	
7	18	(Czech Republic) Petr Kopfstein	0:57.426	
8	37	(Slovenia) Peter Podlunsek	0:57.504	
9	31	(Japan) Yoshihide Muroya	0:57.847	
10	26	(Spain) Juan Velarde	0:58.323	
11	21	(Germany) Matthias Dolderer	0:59.478	+2sec^{1}
12	5	(Chile) Cristian Bolton	1:00.685	
13	12	(France) Francois Le Vot	SCO^{2}	
14	11	(France) Mikael Brageot	DNF^{3}	

- ^1 Incorrect passing (incorrect level flying) at gate 3
- ^2 Safety climb out
- ^3 Exceeding maximum G in gate 4

=== Round of 14 ===
Heat	Pilot One	Time One	Time Two	Pilot Two
1	(Spain) Juan Velarde	0:59.128	1:00.531^{1}	(United States) Michael Goulian
2	(Germany) Matthias Dolderer	1:01.357^{2}	1:01.287^{3}	(United States) Kirby Chambliss
3	(Japan) Yoshihide Muroya	1:04.153^{4}	1:02.794^{5}	(Australia) Matt Hall
4	(Chile) Cristian Bolton	1:01.837	1:01.900^{6}	(France) Nicolas Ivanoff
5	(Slovenia) Peter Podlunsek	1:05.272^{7}	1:01.864	(Czech Republic) Petr Kopfstein
6	(France) Francois Le Vot	1:00.794	1:00.952	(Czech Republic) Martin Sonka
7	(France) Mikael Brageot	1:03.650^{8}	0:58.358	(Canada) Pete McLeod

Key
Qualified for next round
Knocked out
Fastest loser, qualified

- ^1 Pylon Hit at gate 4
- ^2 Pylon hit at gate 6b
- ^3 Pylon hit at gate 10
- ^4 Pylon hit at gate 10, incorrect passing (incorrect level flying) in gate 14
- ^5 Pylon hit at gate 3
- ^6 Incorrect passing (incorrect level flying) in gate 14
- ^7 Pylon hit gate 10,11
- ^8 Pylon hit at gate 4

=== Round of 8 ===
Heat	Pilot One	Time One	Time Two	Pilot Two
8	(United States) Kirby Chambliss	0:59.157	1:02.887 ^{1}	(France) Francois Le Vot
9	(Chile) Cristian Bolton	1:03.826 ^{2}	1:00.537 ^{3}	(United States) Michael Goulian
10	(Czech Republic) Petr Kopfstein	0:58.380	0:59.319	(Spain) Juan Velarde
11	(Australia) Matt Hall	1:01.953	0:59.596 ^{4}	(Canada) Pete McLeod

Key
Qualified for next round
Knocked out

- ^1 Pylon hit
- ^2 Exceeding start speed limit, incorrect passing (climbing in the gate)
- ^3 Pylon hit
- ^4 Pylon hit

=== Final 4 ===
Pos	No.	Pilot	Run Time	Pen
1	10	(United States) Kirby Chambliss	0:58.378	
2	84	(Canada) Pete McLeod	0:59.125	+2sec ^{1}
3	99	(United States) Michael Goulian	0:59.650	
4	18	(Czech Republic) Petr Kopfstein	1:04.297	+6sec ^{2}

- ^1 Incorrect passing (incorrect level flying) in gate 3
- ^2 Pylon hits at gates 10, 11

== Challenger Class ==
=== Results (Rescheduled Chiba race) ===
Pos	No.	Pilot	Run Time	Pen
1	6	(Poland) Luke Czepiela	1:07.091	
2	17	(Sweden) Daniel Ryfa	1:07.190	+2sec^{1}
3	24	(United Kingdom) Ben Murphy	1:08.187	
4	78	(Hungary) Daniel Genevey	1:08.339	
5	33	(France) Melanie Astles	1:09.771	+3sec^{2}
6	15	(France) Baptiste Vignes	1:09.964	
7	7	(China) Kenny Chiang	1:10.196	+3sec^{3}
8	48	(United States) Kevin Coleman	1:10.308	+3sec^{4}

- ^1 Incorrect passing (incorrect level flying) at gate 14
- ^2 Pylon hit at gate 4
- ^3 Pylon hit at gate 4
- ^4 Pylon hit at gate 4

=== Results ===
Pos	No.	Pilot	Run Time	Pen
1	7	(China) Kenny Chiang	1:07.264	
2	15	(France) Baptiste Vignes	1:08.265	
3	48	(United States) Kevin Coleman	1:08.965	
4	33	(France) Mélanie Astles	1:09.505	
5	24	(United Kingdom) Ben Murphy	1:09.987	+2sec^{1}
6	17	(Sweden) Daniel Ryfa	1:14.115	+8sec^{2}

- ^1 Incorrect passing (incorrect level flying) in Gate 7
- ^2 Pylon hit at gates 4, 7, incorrect passing (incorrect level flying) in gate 14

== Standings after the event ==
Master Class standings

Pos	Pilot	Pts
1	(United States) Kirby Chambliss	40
2	(Japan) Yoshihide Muroya	39
3	(Czech Republic) Martin Sonka	39
4	(Canada) Pete McLeod	38
5	(Czech Republic) Petr Kopfstein	30
6	(Germany) Matthias Dolderer	24
7	(United States) Michael Goulian	23
8	(Spain) Juan Velarde	21
9	(Australia) Matt Hall	16
10	(France) Nicolas Ivanoff	14
11	(Slovenia) Peter Podlunsek	12
12	(France) Mikael Brageot	9
13	(France) Francois Le Vot	8
14	(Chile) Cristian Bolton	7

Challenger Class standings (Rescheduled Chiba race)

Pos	Pilot	Pts
1	(Germany) Florian Berger	28
2	(Poland) Luke Czepiela	24
3	(Sweden) Daniel Ryfa	24
4	(United States) Kevin Coleman	10
5	(United Kingdom) Ben Murphy	10
6	(France) Melanie Astles	8
7	(Hungary) Daniel Genevey	8
8	(France) Baptiste Vignes	6
9	(China) Kenny Chiang	2

Challenger Class standings

Pos	Pilot	Pts
1	(Germany) Florian Berger	28
2	(Sweden) Daniel Ryfa	24
3	(Poland) Luke Czepiela	24
4	(United States) Kevin Coleman	16
5	(France) Baptiste Vignes	14
6	(China) Kenny Chiang	12
7	(France) Mélanie Astles	12
8	(United Kingdom) Ben Murphy	12
9	(Hungary) Daniel Genevey	8

Previous race: 2017 Red Bull Air Race of Budapest	Red Bull Air Race; 2017 season	Next race: 2017 Red Bull Air Race of Porto
Previous race: none	Red Bull Air Race of Kazan	Next race: 2018 Red Bull Air Race of Kazan
