= Mikaël Brageot =

French air racer

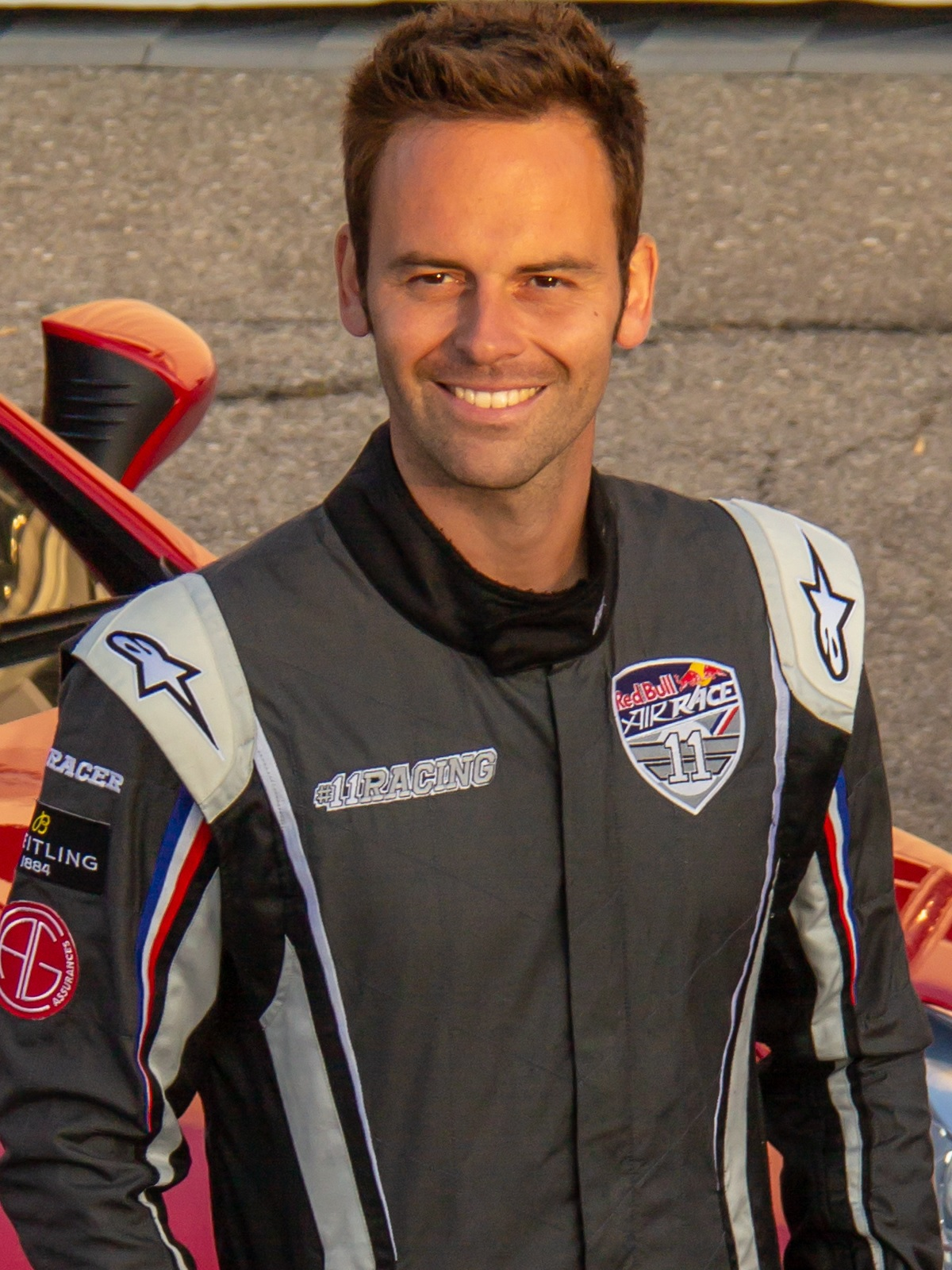
- Born: July 31, 1987 (age 39); Villeneuve-sur-Lot, Nouvelle-Aquitaine
- Aviation career

Racing career
- First race: Challenger: Abu Dhabi 2014; Master: Abu Dhabi 2017
- Best position: 1st (2015 Challenger Class)
- Aircraft: MX Aircraft MXS
- Website: http://www.breitlingracingteam.com/en/breitling-racing-team/mikael-brageot

Mikaël Brageot (French: [mikaɛl bʁaʒo]) is an aerobatics pilot, who competes in the Red Bull Air Race. He was the youngest ever pilot to fly for the French national aerobatic team and has won European championships.

== Results ==
=== Red Bull Air Race ===
==== Challenger Class ====
| Year | 1 | 2 | 3 | 4 | 5 | 6 | 7 | 8 | Points | Wins | Position |
|---|---|---|---|---|---|---|---|---|---|---|---|
| 2014 | (United Arab Emirates); 6th | (Croatia); 4th | (Malaysia); DNP | (Poland); DNP | (United Kingdom); DNP | (United States); 1st | (United States); 3rd | | 20 | 1 | 5th |
| 2015 | (United Arab Emirates); 3rd | (Japan); DNP | (Croatia); 2nd | (Hungary); 2nd | (United Kingdom); DNP | (Austria); 1st | (United States); 1st | | 28 | 2 | 1st |

==== Master Class ====
| Year | 1 | 2 | 3 | 4 | 5 | 6 | 7 | 8 | Points | Wins | Position |
|---|---|---|---|---|---|---|---|---|---|---|---|
| 2017 | (United Arab Emirates); 9th 2 | (United States); 13th 0 | (Japan); 9th 2 | (Hungary); 6th 5 | (Russia); 12th 0 | (Portugal); 5th 6 | (Germany); 7th 4 | (United States); 6th 1 | 20 | 0 | 10th |
| 2018 | (United Arab Emirates); 8th 3 | (France); 5th 6 | (Japan); 5th 6 | (Hungary); 2nd 12 | (Russia); 12th 0 | (Austria); 4th 7 | (United States); 9th 2 | (United States); 6th 5 | 41 | 0 | 4th |

== Gallery ==
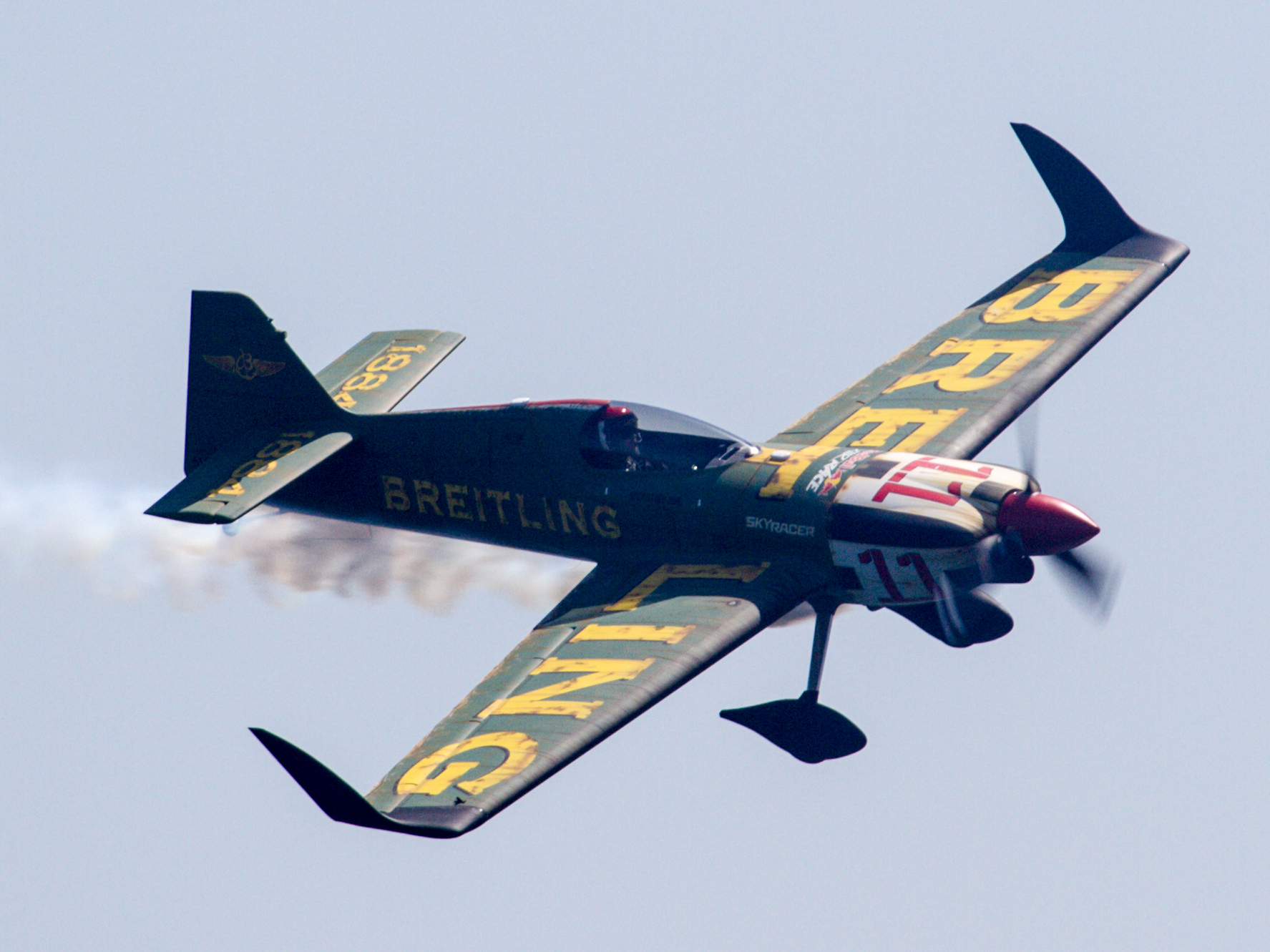
2017 Red Bull Air Race of Chiba - N540XS

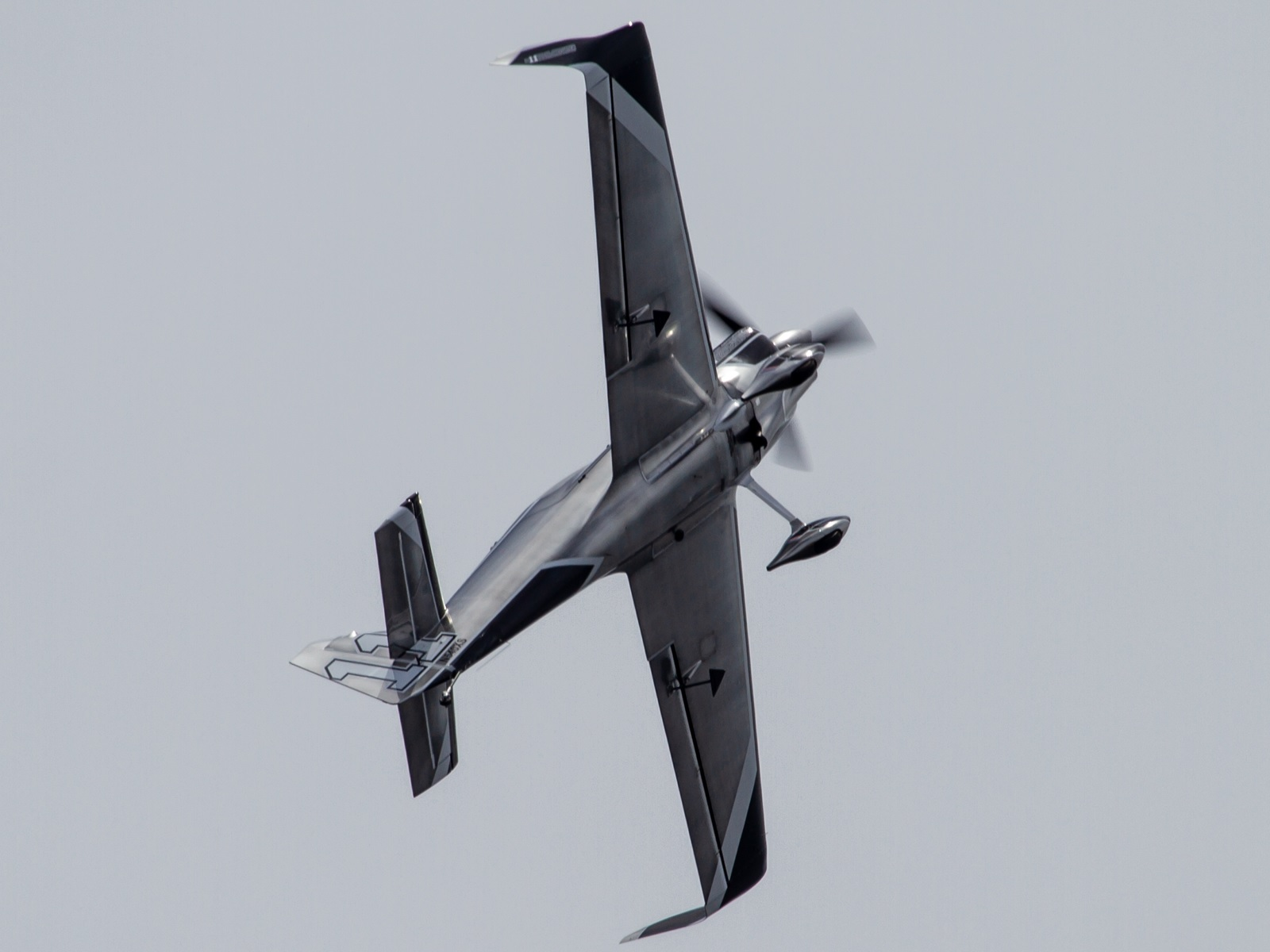
2018 Red Bull Air Race of Chiba - N540XS
