= 2017 Red Bull Air Race of Abu Dhabi =

Coordinates: 24°28′17″N 54°19′50″E

Race Track

The 2017 Red Bull Air Race of Abu Dhabi was the first round of the 2017 Red Bull Air Race World Championship, the twelfth season of the Red Bull Air Race World Championship. The event was held in Zayed Port, Abu Dhabi - the capital city of the United Arab Emirates.

== Master Class ==
=== Qualification ===
Pos	No.	Pilot	Run Time	Pen
1	8	(Czech Republic) Martin Šonka	52.097	
2	99	(United States) Michael Goulian	52.458	
3	10	(United States) Kirby Chambliss	52.500	
4	84	(Canada) Pete McLeod	53.016	
5	26	(Spain) Juan Velarde	53.208	
6	18	(Czech Republic) Petr Kopfstein	53.221	
7	11	(France) Mikaël Brageot	53.326	
8	5	(Chile) Cristian Bolton	53.584	
9	27	(France) Nicolas Ivanoff	53.752	
10	31	(Japan) Yoshihide Muroya	54.680	
11	21	(Germany) Matthias Dolderer	54.695	+2sec
12	12	(France) François Le Vot	54.764	
13	95	(Australia) Matt Hall	55.545	
14	37	(Slovenia) Peter Podlunšek	56.776	+3sec

=== Round of 14 ===
Heat	Pilot One	Time One	Time Two	Pilot Two
1	(Spain) Juan Velarde (5)	52.795	DNF	(Japan) Yoshihide Muroya (10)
2	(Canada) Pete McLeod (4)	54.064	52.984	(Germany) Matthias Dolderer (11)
3	(Czech Republic) Petr Kopfstein (6)	56.740^{2}	54.208	(France) Nicolas Ivanoff (9)
4	(United States) Kirby Chambliss (3)	55.844^{1}	54.410	(France) François Le Vot (12)
5	(France) Mikaël Brageot (7)	54.503	54.228	(Chile) Cristian Bolton (8)
6	(United States) Michael Goulian (2)	54.195	55.332	(Australia) Matt Hall (13)
7	(Czech Republic) Martin Šonka (1)	53.202	DSQ	(Slovenia) Peter Podlunšek (14)

Key
Qualified for next round
Knocked out
Fastest loser, qualified

^1 Pilot received 2 seconds in penalties

^2 Pilot received 3 seconds in penalties

=== Round of 8 ===
Heat	Pilot One	Time One	Time Two	Pilot Two
1	(United States) Michael Goulian (2)	54.960	54.952	(Canada) Pete McLeod (4)
2	(Czech Republic) Martin Šonka (1)	53.525	54.676	(France) Nicolas Ivanoff (9)
3	(Chile) Cristian Bolton (8)	55.890	54.469	(Germany) Matthias Dolderer (11)
4	(Spain) Juan Velarde (5)	55.373	55.973	(France) François Le Vot (12)

Key
Qualified for next round
Knocked out

=== Final 4 ===
Pos	No.	Pilot	Run Time	Pen
1	8	(Czech Republic) Martin Šonka	53.139	
2	26	(Spain) Juan Velarde	54.166	
3	84	(Canada) Pete McLeod	54.632	
4	21	(Germany) Matthias Dolderer	55.227	+2sec

== Challenger Class ==
=== Results ===
Pos	No.	Pilot	Run Time	Pen
1	17	(Sweden) Daniel Ryfa	1:00.206	
2	62	(Germany) Florian Bergér	1:00.561	
3	33	(France) Mélanie Astles	1:01.197	
4	24	(United Kingdom) Ben Murphy	1:02.520	
5	48	(United States) Kevin Coleman	1:04.757	
6	6	(Poland) Luke Czepiela	1:05.513	+3sec
7	15	(France) Baptiste Vignes	1:06.323	+2sec

== Standings after the event ==
Master Class standings

Pos	Pilot	Pts
1	(Czech Republic) Martin Šonka	15
2	(Spain) Juan Velarde	12
3	(Canada) Pete McLeod	9
4	(Germany) Matthias Dolderer	7
5	(France) Nicolas Ivanoff	6

Challenger Class standings

Pos	Pilot	Pts
1	(Sweden) Daniel Ryfa	10
2	(Germany) Florian Bergér	8
3	(France) Mélanie Astles	6
4	(United Kingdom) Ben Murphy	4
5	(United States) Kevin Coleman	2

- Note: Only the top five positions are included for both sets of standings.

Previous race: 2016 Red Bull Air Race of Las Vegas	Red Bull Air Race; 2017 season	Next race: 2017 Red Bull Air Race of San Diego
Previous race: 2016 Red Bull Air Race of Abu Dhabi	Red Bull Air Race of Abu Dhabi	Next race: 2018 Red Bull Air Race of Abu Dhabi
