= Mélanie Astles =

French sportsperson and aviator

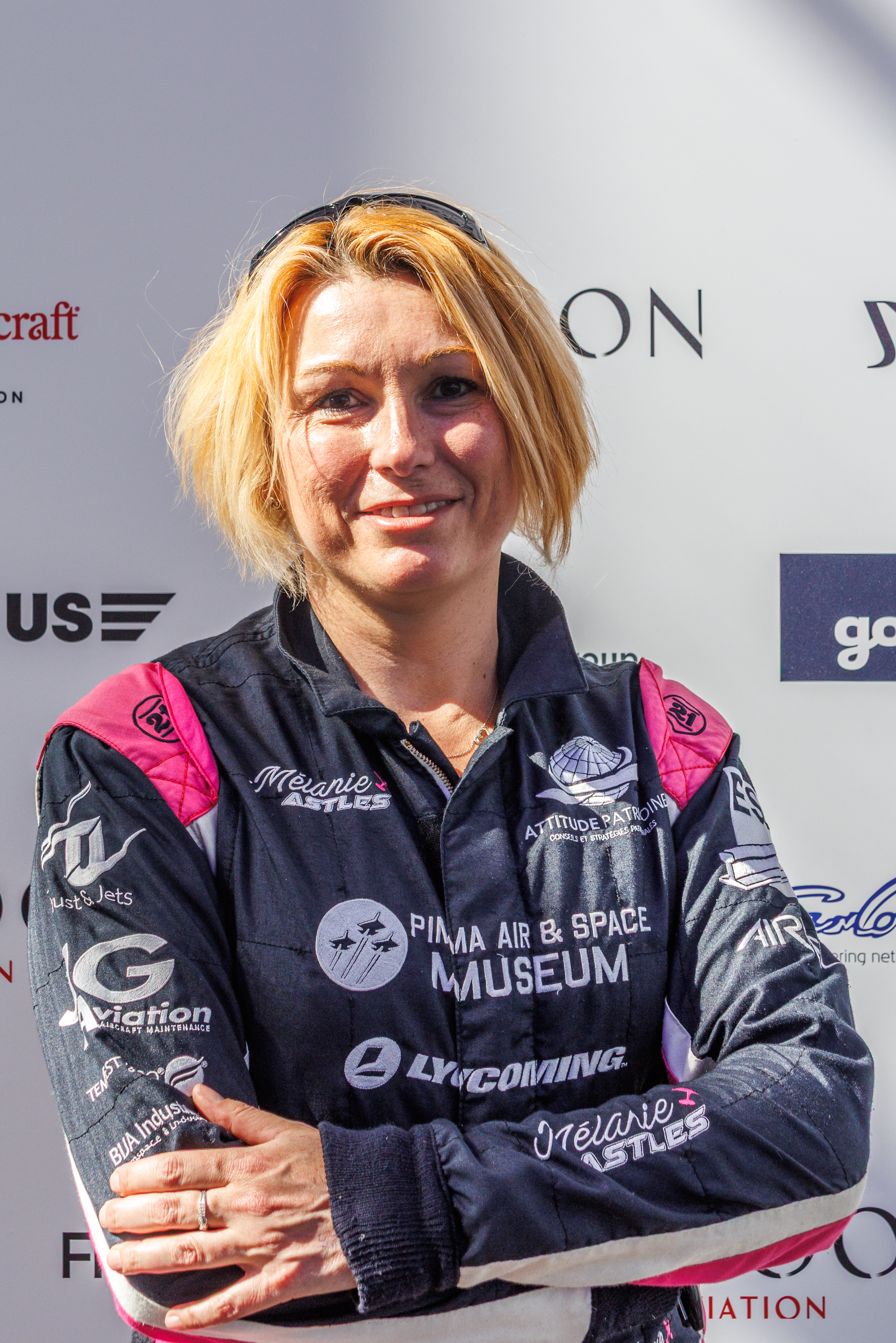
- Born: May 30, 1982 (age 44); Rugby, Warwickshire (United Kingdom)
- Known for: French aerobatics champion

Mélanie Astles is the reigning aerobatics champion of France.

== Biography ==
Melanie Astles was born on 30 May 1982 in Rugby, England, to a French mother and a British father. Melanie and her parents left for France when she was three years old. Brought up in the south of France in a very modest home environment she went to school in Monaco and left at the age of eighteen before graduating. As a student she did quite well, but quickly she became bored of the classroom and would often day dream about flying. She wanted to become a fighter pilot but was quickly discouraged by the fact that there was only one female pilot in the army at the time. She was also told her low scores in maths and physics would make this dream impossible.

Upon leaving school she found a job working at a gas station, and became a manager at another a year later. She worked this job for seven years. She saved up money from her job to take flight lessons. At the age of 21 she began minor lessons in flying. It was at this time she met Laurent Gil her first instructor who immediately recognized her talent and encouraged her to pursue a career professionally. She began working for free at the flight school and leveraged enough free lessons to meet the standard required amount for becoming a commercial pilot. Melanie has always lacked in financial support. Most of her competitors had the edge over her in this regard, but these obstacles never impeded on her ability to succeed. Her first ever competition came in 2007 where she ranked 6th out of 20. She then claimed victory at the French Cup. Between 2008 and 2009 she decided to up her skill level. She did so by volunteering in various areas of flying. She became a flight instructor and eventually gained at a job the ENAC School. She returned to competition in 2010 competing at the "Promotion" level and won the North Cup as well as the French championship. These victories awarded her the privilege of being registered on the high level sportswoman list by the French ministry and granting her a position into this prestigious French Aerobatic team.

In 2011 she decided she wanted to skip ahead in competition levels, but was met with restraint as various managers of the federation were not happy with her confidence in attempting to supersede the usual trajectory. She was unable to fly that year. She returned in 2012, took the Cap 10 beginner plane and rounded out a 3rd-place finish behind two military pilots with much superior training and planes. The finish allowed her to move into the "Advanced" level with the ability to compete internationally. In 2013 at her first international contest she finished 9th out 50 pilots in the European Advanced Championships. She was the best ranked female in that competition and again did so with the least amount of training. In 2014 she finished 7th out of 66 at the World "Advanced" Championships. In this specific competition she had to overcome mechanical failure, and was forced to use the plane of another pilot. She had no experience flying this particular type of plane, but she risked the dangers to avoid disqualification. It was after this incident that many recognized her as a force to be reckoned with. She won the French title in the "Excellence" level and qualified for the "Unlimited" level qualifications in 2015, the highest level of the sport. To date she's a five-time French Champion, with top ten rankings at European and World levels, as well as French team honors. Her resilience has led her to becoming an ambassador for BMW France.

== Results ==
=== Red Bull Air Race ===
==== Challenger Class ====
Year	1	2	3	4	5	6	7	8	Points	Wins	Position
2016	(United Arab Emirates); DNP	(Austria); 6th	(Japan); 4th	(Hungary); 5th	(United Kingdom); 4th	(Germany); 5th	(United States); 2nd	(United States); CAN	16	0	7th
2017	(United Arab Emirates); 3rd	(United States); DNP	(Hungary); DNP	(Russia); 5th	(Russia); 4th	(Portugal); 3rd	(Germany); 5th	(United States); 1st	23	1	5th
2018	(United Arab Emirates); DNP	(France); 4th	(Hungary); 4th	(Russia); 4th	(Austria); DNP	(Austria); 4th	(United States); DNP	(United States); DNP	16	0	8th*
