= Ben Murphy (aviator) =

British pilot (born 1975)

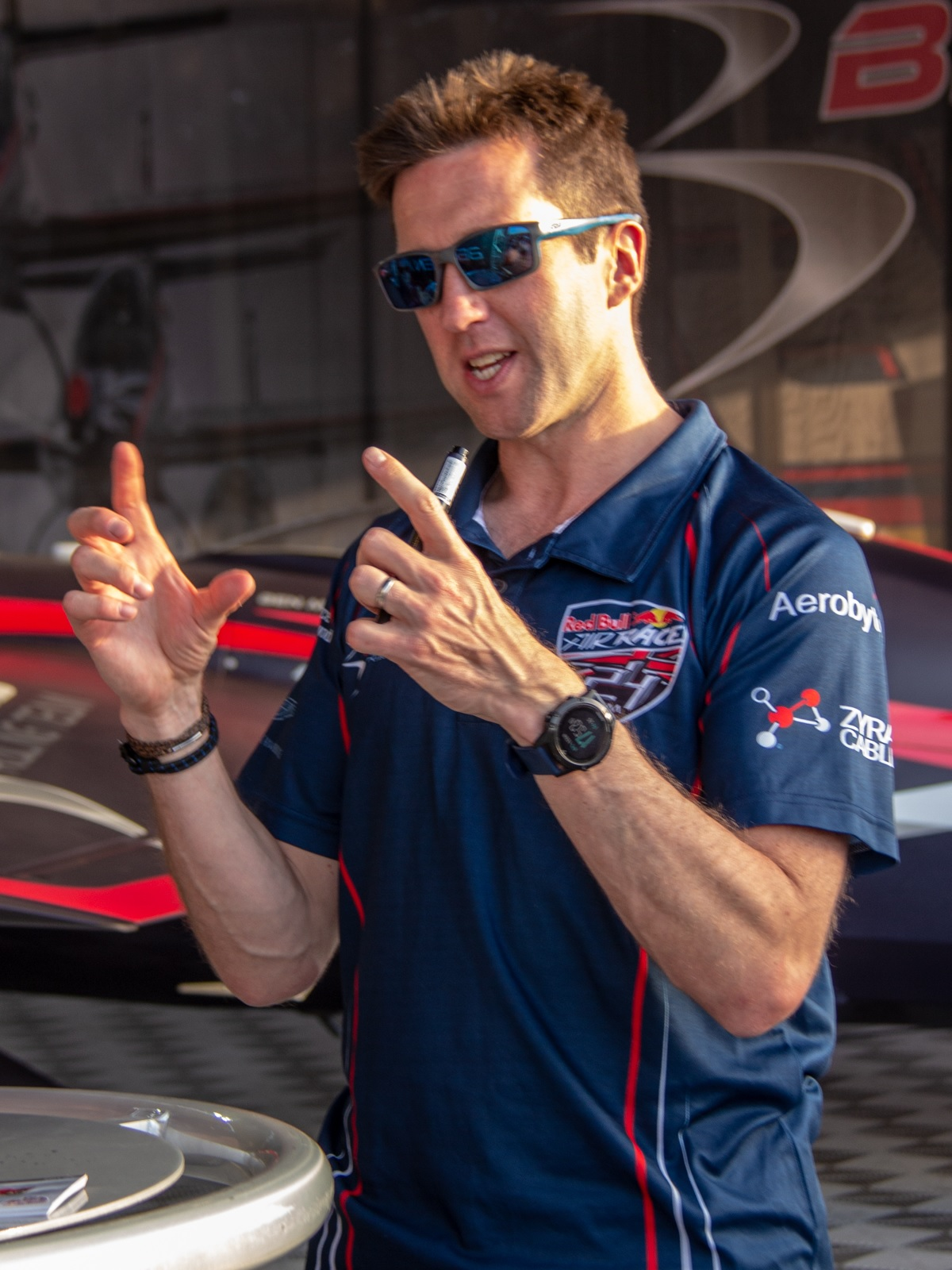
- Born: 18 July 1975
- Education: Newcastle University
- Aviation career
- Air force: Royal Air Force

Racing career
- Aircraft: Zivko Edge 540 V2

Ben Murphy is a British pilot. He is a pilot of The Blades aerobatic team, and master class of the Red Bull Air Race World Championship. He is a former commanding officer of the Royal Air Force display team The Red Arrows

== Biography ==
His grandfathers were Royal Air Force pilots. While attending Newcastle University, he belonged to the Air Squadron.

In 1997, he enlisted in the Royal Air Force. In 2006, he was appointed team pilot of Red Arrows.

In 2016, he joined the Red Bull Air Race as Challenger class pilot. In 2018, he was promoted to the master class from the Challenger class of Red Bull Air Race.

In 2019, he finished 4th in the Red Bull Air Race World Championship in only his second season as a Master Class Pilot

He uses Zivko Edge 540 V2 (Aircraft registration: N540BM) in the air race. The aircraft's liveries are Union Jack. The original owner of this aircraft was Peter Podlunšek (S5-MPP).

== Results ==
=== Red Bull Air Race ===
==== Challenger Class ====
| Year | 1 | 2 | 3 | 4 | 5 | 6 | 7 | 8 | Points | Wins | Position |
|---|---|---|---|---|---|---|---|---|---|---|---|
| 2016 | United Arab Emirates; 4th | Austria; DNP | Japan; 5th | Hungary; 2nd | United Kingdom; 6th | Germany; 3rd | United States; 3rd | United States; CAN | 20 | 0 | 6th |
| 2017 | United Arab Emirates; 4th | United States; DNP | Hungary; DNP | Russia; 3rd | Russia; 5th | Portugal; 5th | Germany; 4th | United States; 3rd | 19 | 0 | 6th |

Legend: * CAN: Cancelled * DNP: Did not take part * DNS: Did not start * DSQ: Disqualified

==== Master class ====
| Year | 1 | 2 | 3 | 4 | 5 | 6 | 7 | 8 | Points | Wins | Position |
|---|---|---|---|---|---|---|---|---|---|---|---|
| 2018 | United Arab Emirates; 6th 5 | France; 10th 1 | Japan; 11th 0 | Hungary; 8th 3 | Russia; 5th 6 | Austria; 13th 0 | United States; 4th 7 | United States; 4th 7 | 29 | 0 | 7th |
| 2019 | United Arab Emirates; 13th 1 | Russia; 5th 14 | Hungary; 2nd 22 | Japan; 8th 11 | – | – | – | – | 48 | 0 | 4th |

== Gallery ==
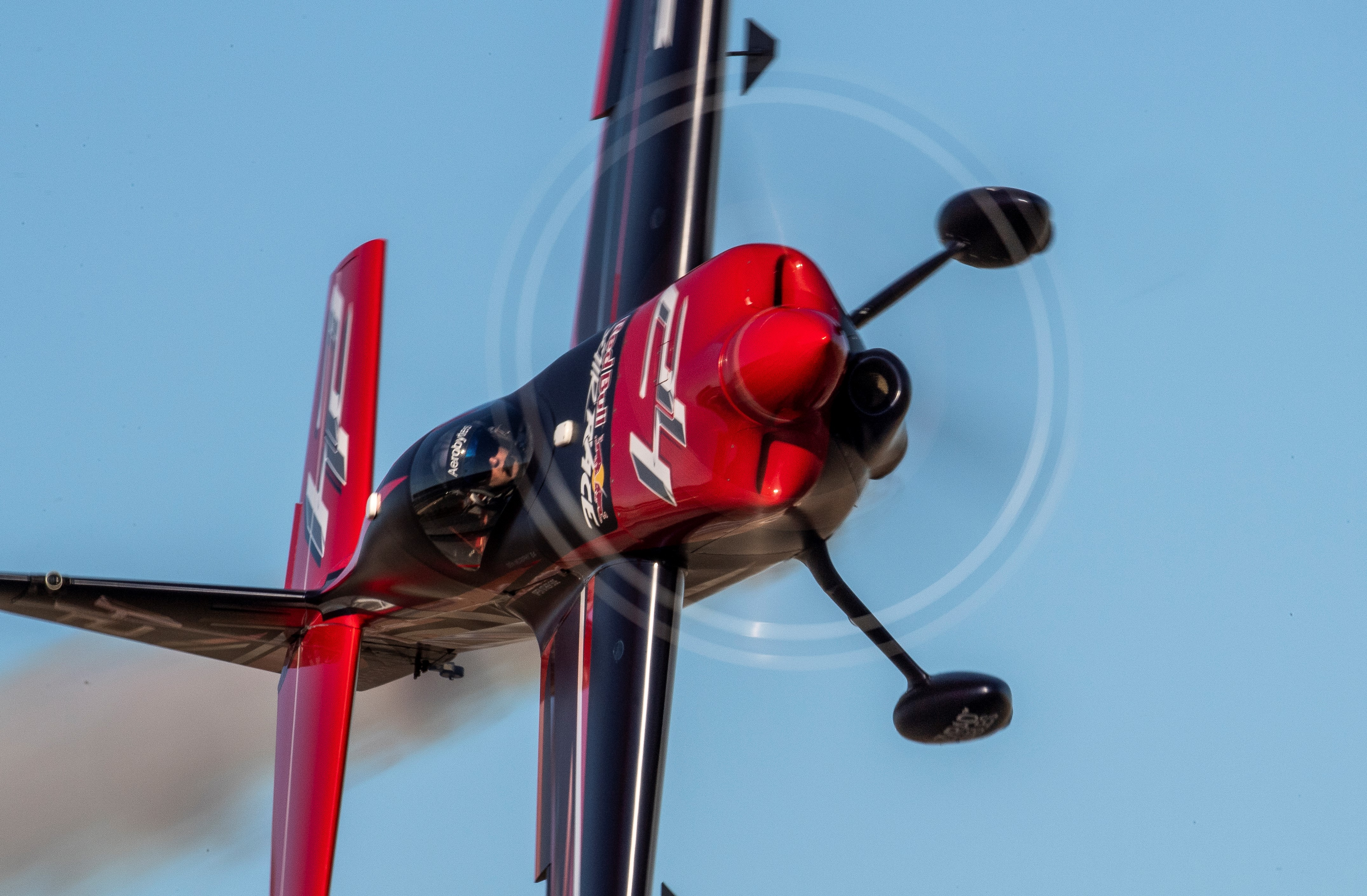
