= 2016 Red Bull Air Race of Ascot =

Coordinates: 51°24′58″N 0°40′37″W

Race Track (Ascot Racecourse)

The 2016 Red Bull Air Race of Ascot was the fifth round of the 2016 Red Bull Air Race World Championship season, the eleventh season of the Red Bull Air Race World Championship. The event was held at the Ascot Racecourse in Berkshire, United Kingdom.

== Master Class ==
=== Qualification ===
Pos	No.	Pilot	Run Time	Pen
1	21	(Germany) Matthias Dolderer	1:05.038	
2	8	(Czech Republic) Martin Šonka	1:05.172	
3	31	(Japan) Yoshihide Muroya	1:05.261	
4	26	(Spain) Juan Velarde	1:06.543	
5	84	(Canada) Pete McLeod	1:06.593	
6	27	(France) Nicolas Ivanoff	1:06.912	
7	22	(Austria) Hannes Arch	1:06.987	
8	95	(Australia) Matt Hall	1:07.075	
9	18	(Czech Republic) Petr Kopfstein	1:07.143	
10	99	(United States) Michael Goulian	1:07.429	
11	9	(United Kingdom) Nigel Lamb	1:07.561	
12	10	(United States) Kirby Chambliss	1:08.018	
13	37	(Slovenia) Peter Podlunšek	1:08.074	
14	12	(France) François Le Vot	1:09.335	

=== Round of 14 ===
Heat	Pilot One	Time One	Time Two	Pilot Two
1	(Canada) Pete McLeod (5)	DSQ	1:05.783	(United States) Michael Goulian (10)
2	(Spain) Juan Velarde (4)	1:07.101^{1}	1:04.251	(United Kingdom) Nigel Lamb (11)
3	(France) Nicolas Ivanoff (6)	1:04.775	DSQ	(Czech Republic) Petr Kopfstein (9)
4	(Japan) Yoshihide Muroya (3)	1:04.310	1:06.179	(United States) Kirby Chambliss (12)
5	(Austria) Hannes Arch (7)	1:05.883	1:04.717	(Australia) Matt Hall (8)
6	(Czech Republic) Martin Šonka (2)	1:06.984^{1}	1:07.044	(Slovenia) Peter Podlunšek (13)
7	(Germany) Matthias Dolderer (1)	1:03.715	1:07.615	(France) François Le Vot (14)

Key
Qualified for next round
Knocked out
Fastest loser, qualified

^1 Pilot received 2 seconds in penalties.

=== Round of 8 ===
Heat	Pilot One	Time One	Time Two	Pilot Two
1	(France) Nicolas Ivanoff (6)	1:05.693	1:04.728	(Australia) Matt Hall (8)
2	(Japan) Yoshihide Muroya (3)	1:06.874^{1}	1:05.894	(United States) Michael Goulian (10)
3	(Austria) Hannes Arch (7)	1:04.818	1:05.030	(United Kingdom) Nigel Lamb (11)
4	(Germany) Matthias Dolderer (1)	1:03.266	1:04.545	(Czech Republic) Martin Šonka (2)

Key
Qualified for next round
Knocked out

^1 Pilot received 3 seconds in penalties.

=== Final 4 ===
Pos	No.	Pilot	Run Time	Pen
1	95	(Australia) Matt Hall	1:03.426	
2	21	(Germany) Matthias Dolderer	1:04.887	
3	22	(Austria) Hannes Arch	DNF	
4	99	(United States) Michael Goulian	DNF	

== Challenger Class ==
=== Results ===
Pos	No.	Pilot	Run Time	Pen
1	48	(United States) Kevin Coleman	1:19.478	
2	62	(Germany) Florian Berger	1:20.190	+2secs
3	5	(Chile) Cristian Bolton	1:21.475	
4	33	(France) Mélanie Astles	1:21.720	
5	17	(Sweden) Daniel Ryfa	1:23.249	+2secs
6	24	(United Kingdom) Ben Murphy	1:23.387	+3secs

== Standings after the event ==
Master Class standings

Pos	Pilot	Pts
1	(Germany) Matthias Dolderer	53.25
2	(Austria) Hannes Arch	35
3	(Australia) Matt Hall	33.75
4	(United States) Kirby Chambliss	27.25
5	(France) Nicolas Ivanoff	26

Challenger Class standings

Pos	Pilot	Pts
1	(United States) Kevin Coleman	26
2	(Germany) Florian Berger	24
3	(Chile) Cristian Bolton	20
4	(Sweden) Daniel Ryfa	18
5	(Poland) Luke Czepiela	8
5	(France) Mélanie Astles	8

- Note: Only the top five positions are included for both sets of standings.

Previous race: 2016 Red Bull Air Race of Budapest	Red Bull Air Race; 2016 season	Next race: 2016 Red Bull Air Race of Lausitz
Previous race: 2015 Red Bull Air Race of Ascot	Red Bull Air Race of Ascot	Next race: 2017 Red Bull Air Race of Ascot
