= 2016 Red Bull Air Race of Abu Dhabi =

Coordinates: 24°28′17″N 54°19′50″E

Race Track

The 2016 Red Bull Air Race of Abu Dhabi was the first round of the 2016 Red Bull Air Race World Championship season, the eleventh season of the Red Bull Air Race World Championship. The event was held in Abu Dhabi, the capital of the United Arab Emirates.

== Master Class ==
=== Qualification ===
| Pos | No. | Pilot | Run Time | Pen |
|---|---|---|---|---|
| 1 | 95 | (Australia) Matt Hall | 58.079 | |
| 2 | 21 | (Germany) Matthias Dolderer | 58.268 | |
| 3 | 99 | (United States) Michael Goulian | 59.184 | |
| 4 | 31 | (Japan) Yoshihide Muroya | 59.242 | |
| 5 | 27 | (France) Nicolas Ivanoff | 59.523 | |
| 6 | 22 | (Austria) Hannes Arch | 59.764 | |
| 7 | 9 | (United Kingdom) Nigel Lamb | 1:00.160 | |
| 8 | 84 | (Canada) Pete McLeod | 1:00.424 | |
| 9 | 26 | (Spain) Juan Velarde | 1:01.008 | |
| 10 | 8 | (Czech Republic) Martin Šonka | 1:01.503 | +2secs |
| 11 | 18 | (Czech Republic) Petr Kopfstein | 1:01.972 | |
| 12 | 12 | (France) François Le Vot | 1:02.135 | |
| 13 | 37 | (Slovenia) Peter Podlunšek | 1:02.154 | +2secs |
| 14 | 10 | (United States) Kirby Chambliss | DNF | |

=== Round of 14 ===
| Heat | Pilot One | Time One | Time Two | Pilot Two |
|---|---|---|---|---|
| 1 | (Czech Republic) Martin Šonka (10) | DSQ | 1:02.628^{1} | (France) Nicolas Ivanoff (5) |
| 2 | (Czech Republic) Petr Kopfstein (11) | 1:05.009 | 1:01.154 | (Japan) Yoshihide Muroya (4) |
| 3 | (Spain) Juan Velarde (9) | 1:01.684^{1} | 1:01.607^{1} | (Austria) Hannes Arch (6) |
| 4 | (France) François Le Vot (12) | 1:00.752 | 1:00.653 | (United States) Michael Goulian (3) |
| 5 | (Canada) Pete McLeod (8) | 1:00.408 | 1:01.722^{2} | (United Kingdom) Nigel Lamb (7) |
| 6 | (Slovenia) Peter Podlunšek (13) | 1:04.992^{1} | 1:02.301^{1} | (Germany) Matthias Dolderer (2) |
| 7 | (United States) Kirby Chambliss (14) | 59.864 | 1:01.299^{2} | (Australia) Matt Hall (1) |

Key
Qualified for next round
Knocked out
Fastest loser, qualified

^1 Pilot received 2 seconds in penalties
^2 Pilot received 3 seconds in penalties

=== Round of 8 ===
| Heat | Pilot One | Time One | Time Two | Pilot Two |
|---|---|---|---|---|
| 1 | (France) François Le Vot (12) | 1:03.748 | DNF | (Japan) Yoshihide Muroya (4) |
| 2 | (Austria) Hannes Arch (6) | 58.729 | 59.449 | (United States) Michael Goulian (3) |
| 3 | (Canada) Pete McLeod (8) | DNF | 58.734 | (Germany) Matthias Dolderer (2) |
| 4 | (United States) Kirby Chambliss (14) | 59.260 | 58.601 | (France) Nicolas Ivanoff (5) |

Key
Qualified for next round
Knocked out

=== Final 4 ===
| Pos | No. | Pilot | Run Time | Pen |
|---|---|---|---|---|
| 1 | 27 | (France) Nicolas Ivanoff | 58.550 | |
| 2 | 21 | (Germany) Matthias Dolderer | 58.660 | |
| 3 | 12 | (France) François Le Vot | 1:02.281 | +2secs |
| 4 | 22 | (Austria) Hannes Arch | DSQ | |

== Challenger Class ==
=== Results ===
| Pos | No. | Pilot | Run Time | Pen |
|---|---|---|---|---|
| 1 | 17 | (Sweden) Daniel Ryfa | 1:06.308 | |
| 2 | 48 | (United States) Kevin Coleman | 1:06.945 | |
| 3 | 62 | (Germany) Florian Berger | 1:08.325 | |
| 4 | 24 | (United Kingdom) Ben Murphy | 1:08.390 | |
| 5 | 6 | (Poland) Luke Czepiela | 1:09.206 | |
| 6 | 77 | (Brazil) Francis Barros | DSQ | |

== Standings after the event ==
Master Class standings

| Pos | Pilot | Pts |
|---|---|---|
| 1 | (France) Nicolas Ivanoff | 15 |
| 2 | (Germany) Matthias Dolderer | 12 |
| 3 | (France) François Le Vot | 9 |
| 4 | (Austria) Hannes Arch | 7 |
| 5 | (United States) Kirby Chambliss | 6 |

Challenger Class standings

| Pos | Pilot | Pts |
|---|---|---|
| 1 | (Sweden) Daniel Ryfa | 10 |
| 2 | (United States) Kevin Coleman | 8 |
| 3 | (Germany) Florian Berger | 6 |
| 4 | (United Kingdom) Ben Murphy | 4 |
| 5 | (Poland) Luke Czepiela | 2 |

- Note: Only the top five positions are included for both sets of standings.

| Previous race: 2015 Red Bull Air Race of Las Vegas | Red Bull Air Race; 2016 season | Next race: 2016 Red Bull Air Race of Spielberg |
| Previous race: 2015 Red Bull Air Race of Abu Dhabi | Red Bull Air Race of Abu Dhabi | Next race: 2017 Red Bull Air Race of Abu Dhabi |
