= 2016 Red Bull Air Race of Budapest =

Coordinates: 47°30′23″N 19°02′33″E

Race Track

The 2016 Red Bull Air Race of Budapest was the fourth round of the 2016 Red Bull Air Race World Championship season, the eleventh season of the Red Bull Air Race World Championship. The event was held on the Danube in Budapest, Hungary. Much of the event was cancelled due to heavy rain.

== Master Class ==
=== Qualification ===
Qualifying was cancelled due to inclement weather. Round of 14 fixtures were decided by championship standings.

=== Round of 14 ===
| Heat | Pilot One | Time One | Time Two | Pilot Two |
|---|---|---|---|---|
| 1 | (Austria) Hannes Arch (5) | 59.772 | DNF | (France) François Le Vot (10) |
| 2 | (Japan) Yoshihide Muroya (4) | 59.647 | 59.492 | (Spain) Juan Velarde (11) |
| 3 | (United Kingdom) Nigel Lamb (6) | 1:00.865^{1} | 1:02.778^{2} | (Canada) Pete McLeod (9) |
| 4 | (France) Nicolas Ivanoff (3) | 1:00.480 | 1:02.934^{1} | (United States) Michael Goulian (12) |
| 5 | (Czech Republic) Martin Šonka (7) | DNF | 59.808 | (Australia) Matt Hall (8) |
| 6 | (United States) Kirby Chambliss (2) | 1:01.151^{1} | 1:05.193^{1} | (Slovenia) Peter Podlunšek (13) |
| 7 | (Germany) Matthias Dolderer (1) | 1:04.763^{2} | 1:05.046^{1} | (Czech Republic) Petr Kopfstein (14) |

Key
Qualified for next round
Knocked out
Fastest loser, qualified

^1 Pilot received 2 seconds in penalties

^2 Pilot received 4 seconds in penalties

=== Round of 8 ===
| Heat | Pilot One | Time One | Time Two | Pilot Two |
|---|---|---|---|---|
| 1 | (France) Nicolas Ivanoff (3) | 1:02.578^{1} | 59.236 | (Australia) Matt Hall (8) |
| 2 | (Austria) Hannes Arch (5) | 58.942 | 1:01.689 | (United Kingdom) Nigel Lamb (6) |
| 3 | (United States) Kirby Chambliss (2) | 59.456 | 1:01.350^{1} | (Japan) Yoshihide Muroya (4) |
| 4 | (Germany) Matthias Dolderer (1) | 58.653 | 1:03.149^{2} | (Spain) Juan Velarde (11) |

Key
Qualified for next round
Knocked out

^1 Pilot received 2 seconds in penalties

^2 Pilot received 4 seconds in penalties

=== Final 4 ===
The Final 4 round was not held due to inclement weather. The final results were determined by the times set in the Round of 8, meaning Matthias Dolderer was the event winner. 75% of usual points were awarded in this situation.

== Challenger Class ==
Due to inclement weather on race day the Challenger Class race was cancelled.

== Standings after the event ==
Master Class standings

| Pos | Pilot | Pts |
|---|---|---|
| 1 | (Germany) Matthias Dolderer | 41.25 |
| 2 | (Austria) Hannes Arch | 26 |
| 3 | (United States) Kirby Chambliss | 25.25 |
| 4 | (Japan) Yoshihide Muroya | 22.5 |
| 5 | (France) Nicolas Ivanoff | 22 |

- Note: Only the top five positions are included.

| Previous race: 2016 Red Bull Air Race of Chiba | Red Bull Air Race; 2016 season | Next race: 2016 Red Bull Air Race of Ascot |
| Previous race: 2015 Red Bull Air Race of Budapest | Red Bull Air Race of Budapest | Next race: 2017 Red Bull Air Race of Budapest |
