= 2016 Red Bull Air Race of Spielberg =

Coordinates: 47°13′11″N 14°45′53″E

Location

The 2016 Red Bull Air Race of Spielberg was the second round of the 2016 Red Bull Air Race World Championship season, the eleventh season of the Red Bull Air Race World Championship. The event was held at the Red Bull Ring in Spielberg, Austria.

== Master Class ==
=== Qualification ===
Pos	No.	Pilot	Run Time	Pen
1	26	(Spain) Juan Velarde	55.803	
2	22	(Austria) Hannes Arch	56.254	
3	95	(Australia) Matt Hall	56.498	
4	9	(United Kingdom) Nigel Lamb	56.803	
5	21	(Germany) Matthias Dolderer	56.921	
6	8	(Czech Republic) Martin Šonka	57.056	
7	99	(United States) Michael Goulian	57.697	
8	10	(United States) Kirby Chambliss	57.748	
9	27	(France) Nicolas Ivanoff	57.996	
10	31	(Japan) Yoshihide Muroya	58.286	+1sec
11	84	(Canada) Pete McLeod	58.350	
12	12	(France) François Le Vot	58.432	
13	18	(Czech Republic) Petr Kopfstein	1:00.900	+2secs
14	37	(Slovenia) Peter Podlunšek	1:01.314	

=== Round of 14 ===
Heat	Pilot One	Time One	Time Two	Pilot Two
1	(Germany) Matthias Dolderer (5)	59.616	DNF	(Japan) Yoshihide Muroya (10)
2	(United Kingdom) Nigel Lamb (4)	57.439	58.760	(Canada) Pete McLeod (11)
3	(Czech Republic) Martin Šonka (6)	58.938	58.272	(France) Nicolas Ivanoff (9)
4	(Australia) Matt Hall (3)	58.850	1:00.748	(France) François Le Vot (12)
5	(United States) Michael Goulian (7)	59.203	58.434	(United States) Kirby Chambliss (8)
6	(Austria) Hannes Arch (2)	58.946	59.550	(Czech Republic) Petr Kopfstein (13)
7	(Spain) Juan Velarde (1)	DNF	1:02.047^{1}	(Slovenia) Peter Podlunšek (14)

Key
Qualified for next round
Knocked out
Fastest loser, qualified

^1 Pilot received 2 seconds in penalties.

=== Round of 8 ===
Heat	Pilot One	Time One	Time Two	Pilot Two
1	(Australia) Matt Hall (3)	57.752	57.422	(Canada) Pete McLeod (11)
2	(Austria) Hannes Arch (2)	57.254	57.844	(United States) Kirby Chambliss (8)
3	(Germany) Matthias Dolderer (5)	57.457	59.045	(France) Nicolas Ivanoff (9)
4	(United Kingdom) Nigel Lamb (4)	58.739	1:00.888	(Slovenia) Peter Podlunšek (14)

Key
Qualified for next round
Knocked out

=== Final 4 ===
Pos	No.	Pilot	Run Time	Pen
1	21	(Germany) Matthias Dolderer	56.996	
2	22	(Austria) Hannes Arch	57.336	
3	9	(United Kingdom) Nigel Lamb	57.349	
4	84	(Canada) Pete McLeod	57.598	

== Challenger Class ==
=== Results ===
Pos	No.	Pilot	Run Time	Pen
1	62	(Germany) Florian Berger	1:06.350	
2	48	(United States) Kevin Coleman	1:07.143	
3	17	(Sweden) Daniel Ryfa	1:08.216	+3secs
4	5	(Chile) Cristian Bolton	1:09.161	+3secs
5	77	(Brazil) Francis Barros	1:09.539	+2secs
6	33	(France) Mélanie Astles	1:09.996	+3secs

== Standings after the event ==
Master Class standings

Pos	Pilot	Pts
1	(Germany) Matthias Dolderer	27
2	(France) Nicolas Ivanoff	19
3	(Austria) Hannes Arch	12
4	(Canada) Pete McLeod	11
4	(United States) Kirby Chambliss	11

Challenger Class standings

Pos	Pilot	Pts
1	(Sweden) Daniel Ryfa	16
1	(Germany) Florian Berger	16
1	(United States) Kevin Coleman	16
4	(United Kingdom) Ben Murphy	4
4	(Chile) Cristian Bolton	4

- Note: Only the top five positions are included for both sets of standings.

Previous race: 2016 Red Bull Air Race of Abu Dhabi	Red Bull Air Race; 2016 season	Next race: 2016 Red Bull Air Race of Chiba
Previous race: 2015 Red Bull Air Race of Spielberg	Red Bull Air Race of Spielberg	
