= 2016 Red Bull Air Race of Chiba =

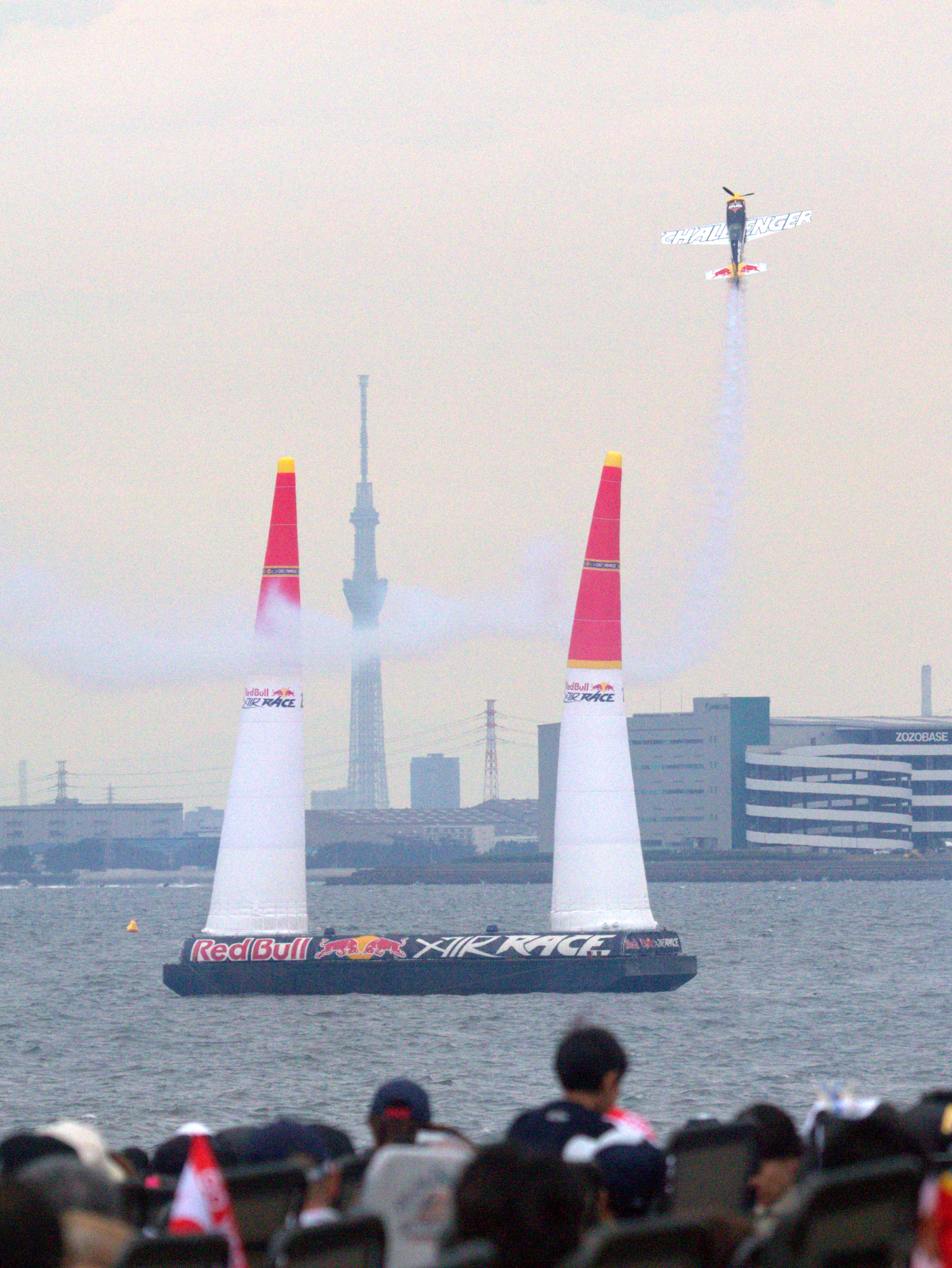
Extra 330LX（OE-ARO）

The 2016 Red Bull Air Race of Chiba was the third round of the 2016 Red Bull Air Race World Championship season, the eleventh season of the Red Bull Air Race World Championship. The event was held in Chiba, Japan.

== Master Class ==
=== Qualification ===
Due to the high seas and rough conditions on the racetrack on Saturday, the Race Committee was forced to cancel the Qualifying session of the Master Class. The Round of 14 fixtures were decided by championship position, whilst the Challenger Class race would take place on Sunday.

=== Round of 14 ===
Heat	Pilot One	Time One	Time Two	Pilot Two
1	(United States) Kirby Chambliss (5)	1:06.509	1:11.608^{3}	(Slovenia) Peter Podlunšek (10)
2	(Canada) Pete McLeod (4)	DNF	1:06.022^{1}	(Japan) Yoshihide Muroya (11)
3	(United Kingdom) Nigel Lamb (6)	1:05.552	DNF	(United States) Michael Goulian (9)
4	(Austria) Hannes Arch (3)	1:05.356	1:04.352	(Czech Republic) Martin Šonka (12)
5	(France) François Le Vot (7)	1:11.064^{2}	1:05.029	(Australia) Matt Hall (8)
6	(France) Nicolas Ivanoff (2)	DNS	1:06.604	(Spain) Juan Velarde (13)
7	(Germany) Matthias Dolderer (1)	1:05.125	1:06.752	(Czech Republic) Petr Kopfstein (14)

Key
Qualified for next round
Knocked out
Fastest loser, qualified

- ^1 Pilot received 1 second in penalties
- ^2 Pilot received 2 seconds in penalties
- ^3 Pilot received 3 seconds in penalties

=== Round of 8 ===
Heat	Pilot One	Time One	Time Two	Pilot Two
1	(Austria) Hannes Arch (3)	1:06.144^{1}	1:05.128	(United Kingdom) Nigel Lamb (6)
2	(Germany) Matthias Dolderer (1)	DNF	1:04.610	(Japan) Yoshihide Muroya (11)
3	(United States) Kirby Chambliss (5)	1:05.352	DNF	(Australia) Matt Hall (8)
4	(Czech Republic) Martin Šonka (12)	1:05.144	1:06.143	(Spain) Juan Velarde (13)

Key
Qualified for next round
Knocked out

- ^1 Pilot received 1 second in penalties

=== Final 4 ===
Pos	No.	Pilot	Run Time	Pen
1	31	(Japan) Yoshihide Muroya	1:04.992	
2	8	(Czech Republic) Martin Šonka	1:05.097	
3	10	(United States) Kirby Chambliss	1:05.618	
4	9	(United Kingdom) Nigel Lamb	1:05.734	

== Challenger Class ==
=== Results ===
Pos	No.	Pilot	Run Time	Pen
1	5	(Chile) Cristian Bolton	1:15.747	
2	48	(United States) Kevin Coleman	1:16.304	
3	6	(Poland) Luke Czepiela	1:17.514	
4	33	(France) Mélanie Astles	1:17.730	
5	24	(United Kingdom) Ben Murphy	1:18.496	
6	77	(Brazil) Francis Barros	1:21.439	+3secs

== Standings after the event ==
Master Class standings

Pos	Pilot	Pts
1	(Germany) Matthias Dolderer	30
2	(United States) Kirby Chambliss	20
3	(France) Nicolas Ivanoff	19
4	(Japan) Yoshihide Muroya	18
5	(Austria) Hannes Arch	17

Challenger Class standings

Pos	Pilot	Pts
1	(United States) Kevin Coleman	24
2	(Germany) Florian Berger	16
2	(Sweden) Daniel Ryfa	16
4	(Chile) Cristian Bolton	14
5	(Poland) Luke Czepiela	8

- Note: Only the top five positions are included for both sets of standings.

Previous race: 2016 Red Bull Air Race of Spielberg	Red Bull Air Race; 2016 season	Next race: 2016 Red Bull Air Race of Budapest
Previous race: 2015 Red Bull Air Race of Chiba	Red Bull Air Race of Chiba	Next race: 2017 Red Bull Air Race of Chiba
