= Nicolas Ivanoff =

French pilot and flying instructor (born 1967)

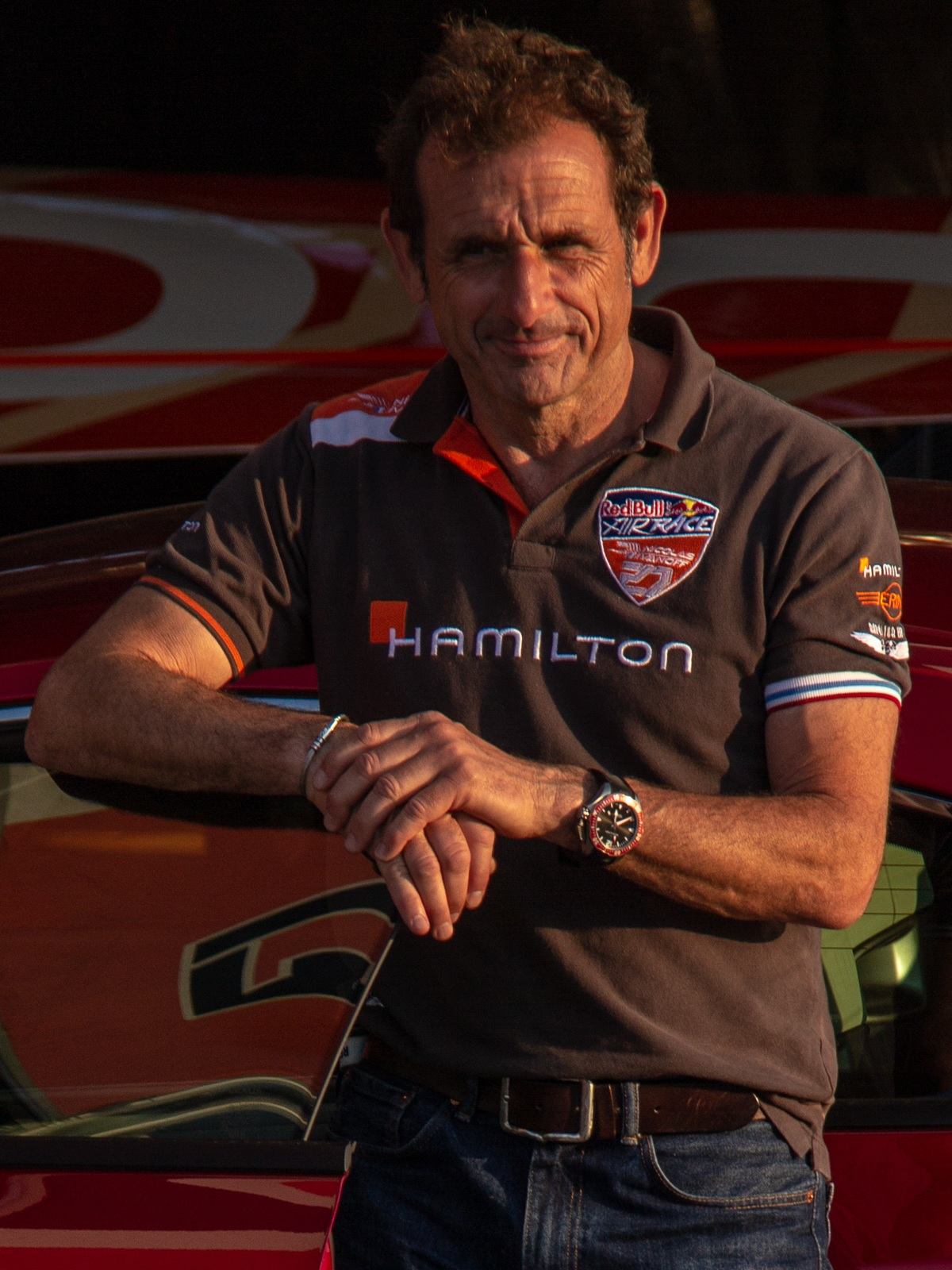
- Born: 4 July 1967 (age 59); Ajaccio, Corsica, France
- Aviation career

Racing career
- First race: 2005
- Best position: 7th (2005, 2006)
- Aircraft: Zivko Edge 540
- Website: nicolasivanoff.com

Nicolas Ivanoff (born 4 July 1967 in Ajaccio, Corsica) is a French pilot and flying instructor, who currently races in the Red Bull Air Race World Series under the number 7. Ivanoff is nicknamed "The Quick Corsican". His highlight of 2010 so far is the attendance of the Headstart Aerospace Course at the University of Liverpool (UK) to play guest pilot of eight modified Grob G115E "Tutors." He makes numerous donations to charities and aeronautical organisations.

At the Red Bull Air Race World Series, he has been sponsored by the Hamilton Watch Company.

== Racing record ==
=== Red Bull Air Race World Championship ===
==== 2004-2010 ====
(France) Nicolas Ivanoff at the Red Bull Air Race World Series
Year	1	2	3	4	5	6	7	8	9	10	11	12	Points	Wins	Rank
2004	(United Kingdom); DNP	(Hungary); 5th	(United States); DNS										2	0	8th
2005	(United Arab Emirates); 4th	(Netherlands); 6th	(Austria); 6th	(Republic of Ireland); 2nd	(United Kingdom); 7th	(Hungary); 7th	(United States); 6th						11	0	7th
2006	(United Arab Emirates); 5th	(Spain); 5th	(Germany); 9th	(Russia); CAN	(Turkey); 5th	(Hungary); 6th	(United Kingdom); 9th	(United States); 9th	(Australia); 9th				7	0	7th
2007	(United Arab Emirates); 9th	(Brazil); 11th	(United States); 12th	(Turkey); 13th	(Spain); CAN	(Switzerland); 8th	(United Kingdom); 9th	(Hungary); 12th	(Portugal); 6th	(United States); 7th	(Mexico); CAN	(Australia); 1st	7	1	7th
2008	(United Arab Emirates); 9th	(United States); 10th	(United States); 6th	(Sweden); CAN	(Netherlands); 11th	(United Kingdom); 2nd	(Hungary); 10th	(Portugal); 9th	(Spain); CAN	(Australia); 5th			19	0	9th
2009	(United Arab Emirates); 3rd	(United States); 1st	(Canada); 9th	(Hungary); 8th	(Portugal); 12th	(Spain); 7th							33	1	5th
2010	(United Arab Emirates); 9th	(Australia); 6th	(Brazil); 6th	(Canada); 7th	(United States); 6th	(Germany); 5th	(Hungary); CAN	(Portugal); CAN					33	0	6th
Series not held between 2011 and 2013

==== 2014- ====
Year	1	2	3	4	5	6	7	8	Points	Wins	Rank
2014	(United Arab Emirates); 8th	(Croatia); 5th	(Malaysia); 11th	(Poland); 6th	(United Kingdom); 3rd	(United States); 1st	(United States); 6th	(Australia); 1st	42	2	4th
2015	(United Arab Emirates); 8th	(Japan); 4th	(Croatia); 9th	(Hungary); 14th	(United Kingdom); 4th	(Austria); 9th	(United States); 7th	(United States); 7th	15	0	9th
2016	(United Arab Emirates); 1st	(Austria); 7th	(Japan); 14th	(Hungary); 7th	(United Kingdom); 7th	(Germany); 7th	(United States); 6th	(United States); CAN	35	1	5th
2017	(United Arab Emirates); 5th	(United States); 7th	(Japan); 13th	(Hungary); 7th	(Russia); 11th	(Portugal); 11th	(Germany); 9th	(United States); 13th	16	0	11th
2018	(United Arab Emirates); 10th	(France); 14th	(Japan); 12th	(Hungary); 7th	(Russia); 10th	(Austria); 6th	(United States); 3rd	(United States); 9th	22	0	10th
2019	(United Arab Emirates); 4th								18	0	4th

Legend:

- CAN: Cancelled
- DNP: Did not participate
- DNS: Did not show
- DQ: Disqualified
- NC: Not classified

== Gallery ==
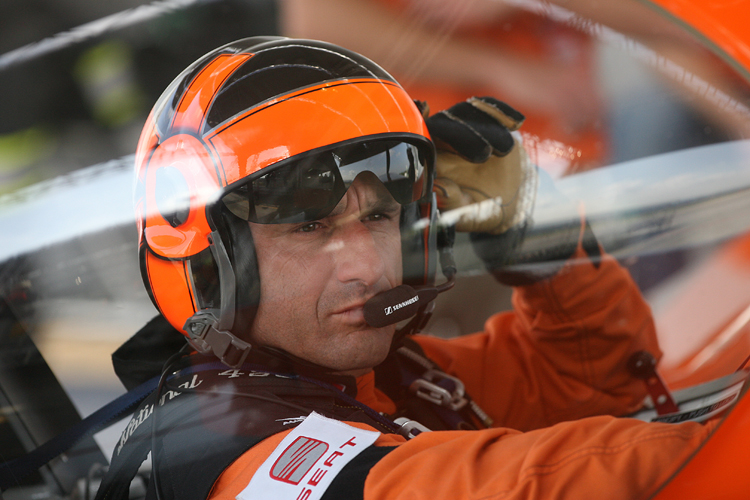
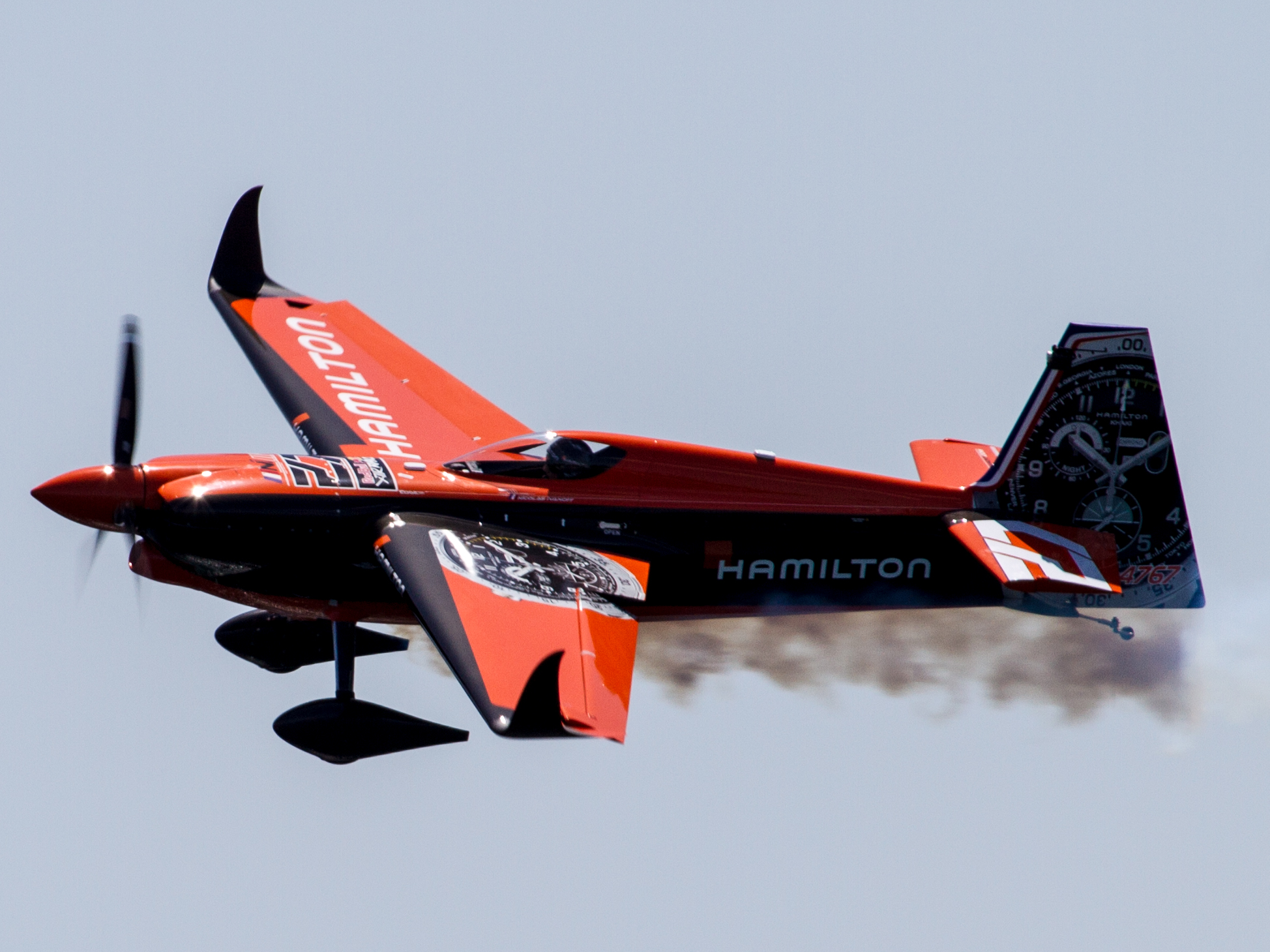

== See also ==
- Competition aerobatics
