= Matt Hall (pilot) =

Australian pilot (born 1971)

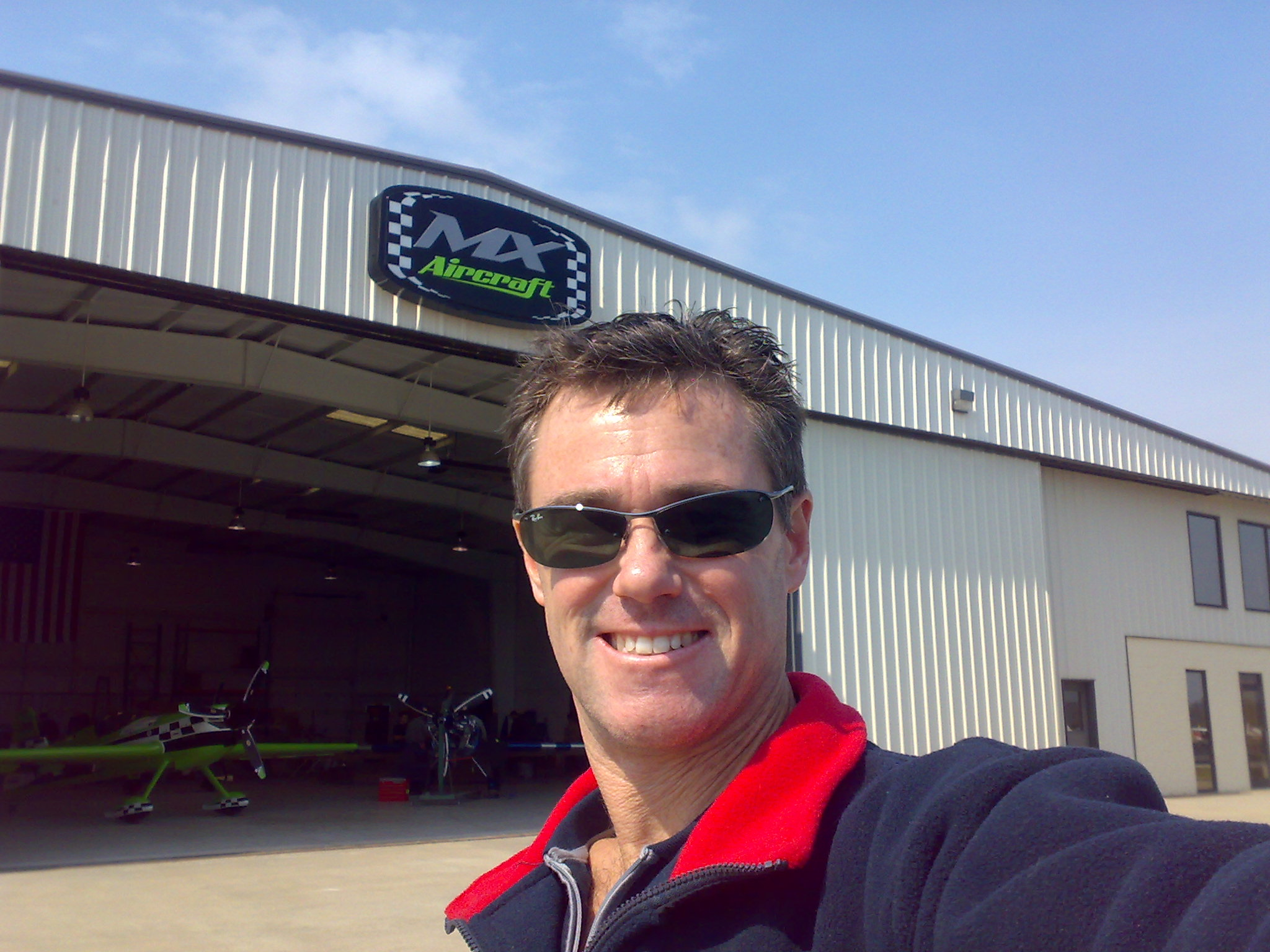
- Matt Hall at the first round of the 2019 Red Bull Air Race
- Born: 16 September 1971 (age 55); Newcastle, New South Wales
- Aviation career
- Air force: Royal Australian Air Force

Racing career
- First race: 2009
- Best position: 1st (2019)
- Aircraft: Zivko Edge 540 V3
- Military career
- Branch: Royal Australian Air Force
- Rank: Wing Commander
- Website: matthallracing.com

Matt Hall (born 16 September 1971 in Newcastle, Australia) is a third-generation pilot, a former Royal Australian Air Force (RAAF) fighter combat instructor, international unlimited aerobatic competitor and the first Australian to be selected to compete in the Red Bull Air Race World Championship, starting in 2009 with his team Matt Hall Racing. He won the championship in the final season of Red Bull Air Race in 2019.

== Flying history ==
Hall has a long flying history, having started flying with his father at an early age. He is a third-generation pilot, his grandfather having flown in World War II.

Hall's first solo flight was at age 15 in a glider, and he gained his aircraft pilot's licence at the age of 18. He is licensed in gliders, ultra-lights and hang gliders, and has had one parachute jump. He has more than 4,000 hours in various aircraft types, including over 700 in light aircraft and over 500 doing aerobatics. As these flights are often only 20–30 minutes, he has many more takeoffs and landings. Hall has over 300 hours in his airshow display aircraft, the Giles G-202.

A Mustang P-51D is his fifth aircraft (the others were a Vans RV-4, Acrosport II biplane, Piper Cherokee180C and the Giles G-202). He raced an MXS-R during the first five seasons of his Red Bull Air Race World Championship career (2009–2010, 2014–2016), switching to his current race plane, the Zivko Edge 540 V3, for the beginning of the 2017 Red Bull Air Race World Championship.

He also flies an EXTRA300L in which he performs domestic displays and conducts more than 400 joy flight experiences per year.

== Military career ==
As a Royal Australian Air Force (RAAF) fighter pilot, Hall logged over 1,500 F/A-18 Hornet hours. As a Fighter Combat Instructor, in 2006 he completed a tour as the chief instructor for this demanding course.

He has received many awards during his military career, including Dux of Pilot, F/A-18 Hornet and Fighter Combat Instructor courses, the 1997 Fighter Pilot of the Year, and he was awarded a Chief of Air Force commendation for his performance as the Chief Instructor of the 2006 Fighter Combat Instructor course.

Hall spent three years in the United States of America on a USAF exchange programme, flying over 500 hours in the F-15E Strike Eagle, including combat. For his efforts, he was awarded combat decorations by both the US and Australia.

He resigned from the RAAF to allow him to become a full-time race pilot.

== Aerobatic history ==
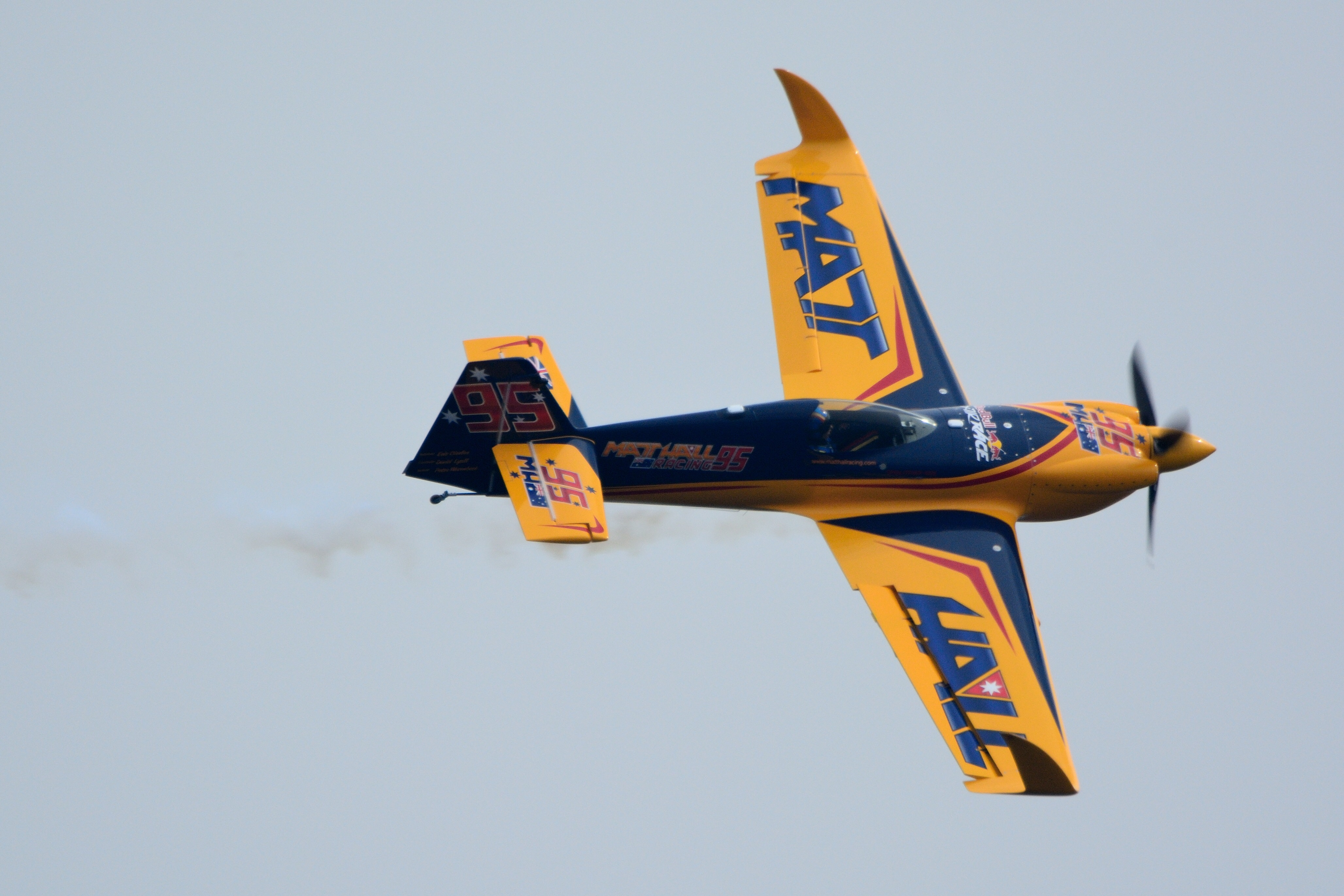
Hall finished second in the 2015 Red Bull Air Race of Chiba.

Hall has flown aerobatics for many years, becoming more serious about competition and display aerobatics whilst on his military exchange in the USA. He travelled widely to air shows, fly-ins and aerobatic competitions, and was inspired by performances at the 2003 World Aerobatic Championships (WAC) in Florida. Through involvement at competitions and as a member of the International Aerobatic Club, he was able to be coached and mentored by many of the top US competitors and performers.

Initially competing in his Acrosport II biplane, he won the US East Coast Aerobatic Championship at the Sportsman level. He soon reached the limits of the aircraft's capabilities, and moved up to the Giles G-202, which he brought back to Australia, as the first of type. He won the NSW State Aerobatic Championships at Intermediate level in the Giles G-202 in October 2005.

In April 2006 Hall won the Australian Aerobatic Championships at the Advanced level, his first Nationals and Advanced competition. In April 2007 he moved up to Unlimited, and competed at the Australian National Aerobatic Championships, placing second overall, but first in Freestyle. He then went on to compete in the US Nationals in September, using Rob Holland's MX-2, achieving 10th place overall, and 5th in the Freestyle competition.

In November 2007, the Red Bull Air Race offered him the chance to participate in a series of Training Camps under former world champion Patrick Paris, as a lead up to the 2008 European Aerobatic Championships. During the lead up, he competed in the World Aerobatics Cup in Prague, finishing 8th, then achieved the required top half finish in the European Championships, finishing his eligibility requirements for selection for a Red Bull Air Race Qualification Camp. Racing aside, he aims to be aerobatic World Champion in the future.

In September 2008, he successfully completed the Red Bull Air Race Qualification Camp, becoming the first Australian to be awarded the coveted Red Bull Air Race Super Licence. Finally, in November 2008 he heard the news that he was selected to join Red Bull Air Race World Championship circuit in 2009.

In June 2010 while qualifying for first session in Windsor, Ontario for the Red Bull Air Race his plane touched the water of the Detroit River due to aerodynamic wing stall but he recovered and landed safely. The plane received "superficial damage", mainly to the right aileron.

Competition aside, Hall also spends a significant amount of his aerobatic flying working on his high energy display flying. This is a new style of "freestyle" flying, in which the pilot uses the aircraft surfaces in novel ways to develop new manoeuvres such as end-over-end tumbling. He is based at Belmont Airport, near his hometown of Newcastle, having purchased the site with other investors including a skydiving company in July 2014.

== Achievements ==
=== Red Bull Air Race ===
Year	Class	Aircraft	1	2	3	4	5	6	7	8	Position	Points
2009	Master	MX Aircraft MXS	ABU; 5	SDE; 5	WIN; 7	BUD; 7	POR; 3	BAR; 9			3rd	36
2010	Master	MX Aircraft MXS	ABU; 8	PER; 2	RIO; 4	WIN; DSQ	NYC; DSQ	LAU; 3	BUD; CAN	LIS; CAN	7th	31
2014	Master	MX Aircraft MXS	ABU; 4	ROV; 7	PUT; 3	GDY; 3	ASC; 5	FTW; 6	LVG; 4	SPI; 10	6th	33
2015	Master	MX Aircraft MXS	ABU; 2	CHI; 2	ROV; 3	BUD; 5	ASC; 2	SPI; 1	FTW; 2	LVG; 1	2nd	71
2016	Master	MX Aircraft MXS	ABU; 9	SPI; 5	CHI; 7	BUD; 3	ASC; 1	LAU; 1	IND; 4	LVG; CAN	2nd	55.75
2017	Master	Zivko Edge 540	ABU; 10	SDE; 9	CHI; 6	BUD; 8	KAZ; 6	POR; 3	LAU; 2	IND; 8	6th	40
2018	Master	Zivko Edge 540	ABU; 5	CAN; 1	CHI; 1	BUD; 3	KAZ; 7	WIN; 3	IND; 6	FTW; 2	2nd	75
2019	Master	Zivko Edge 540	ABU; 5	KAZ; 2	ZAM; 1	EUR; C	CHI; 3	ASI; C	IND; C	KSA; C	1st	81

== Media ==
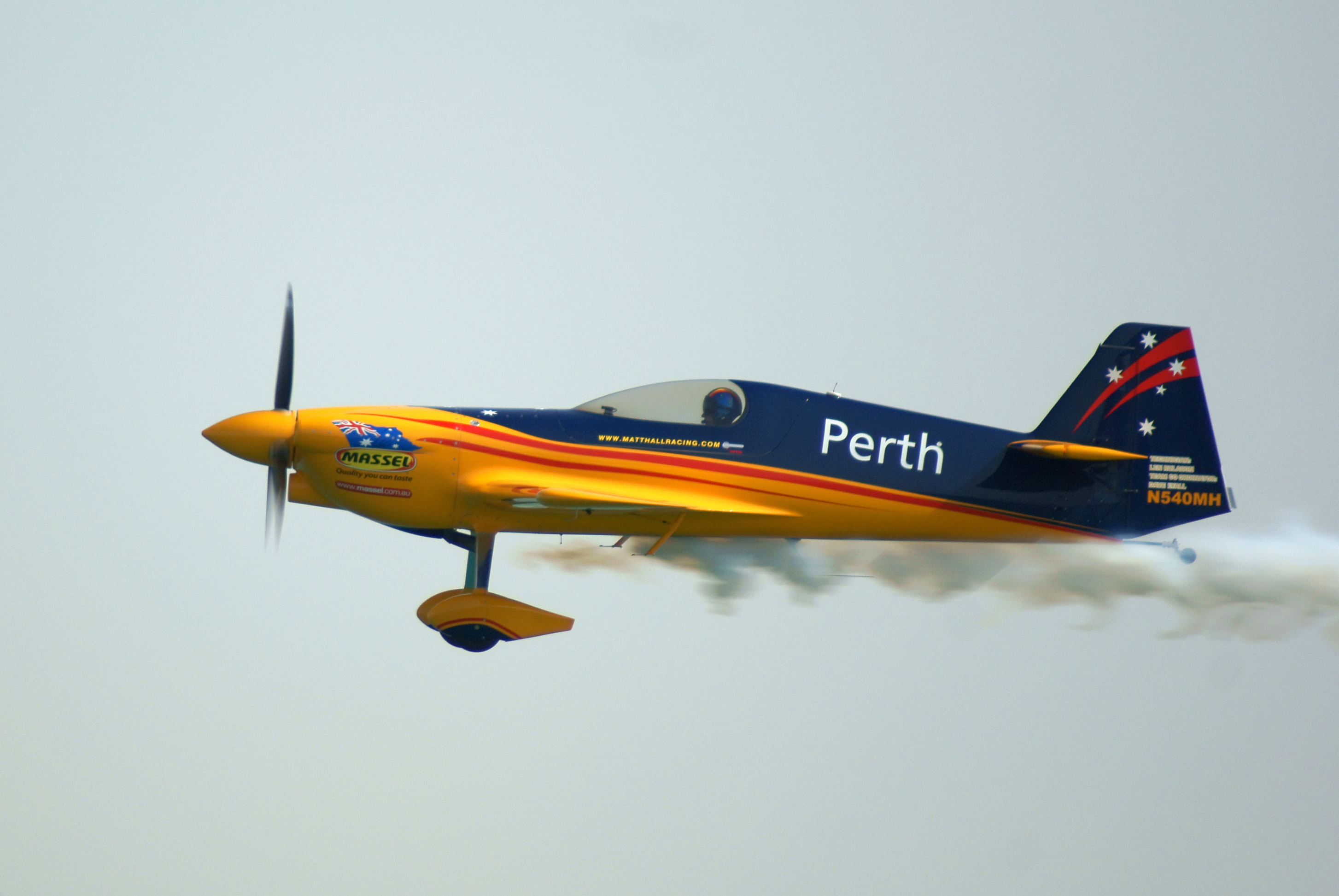
Competing in the 2010 Abu Dhabi event

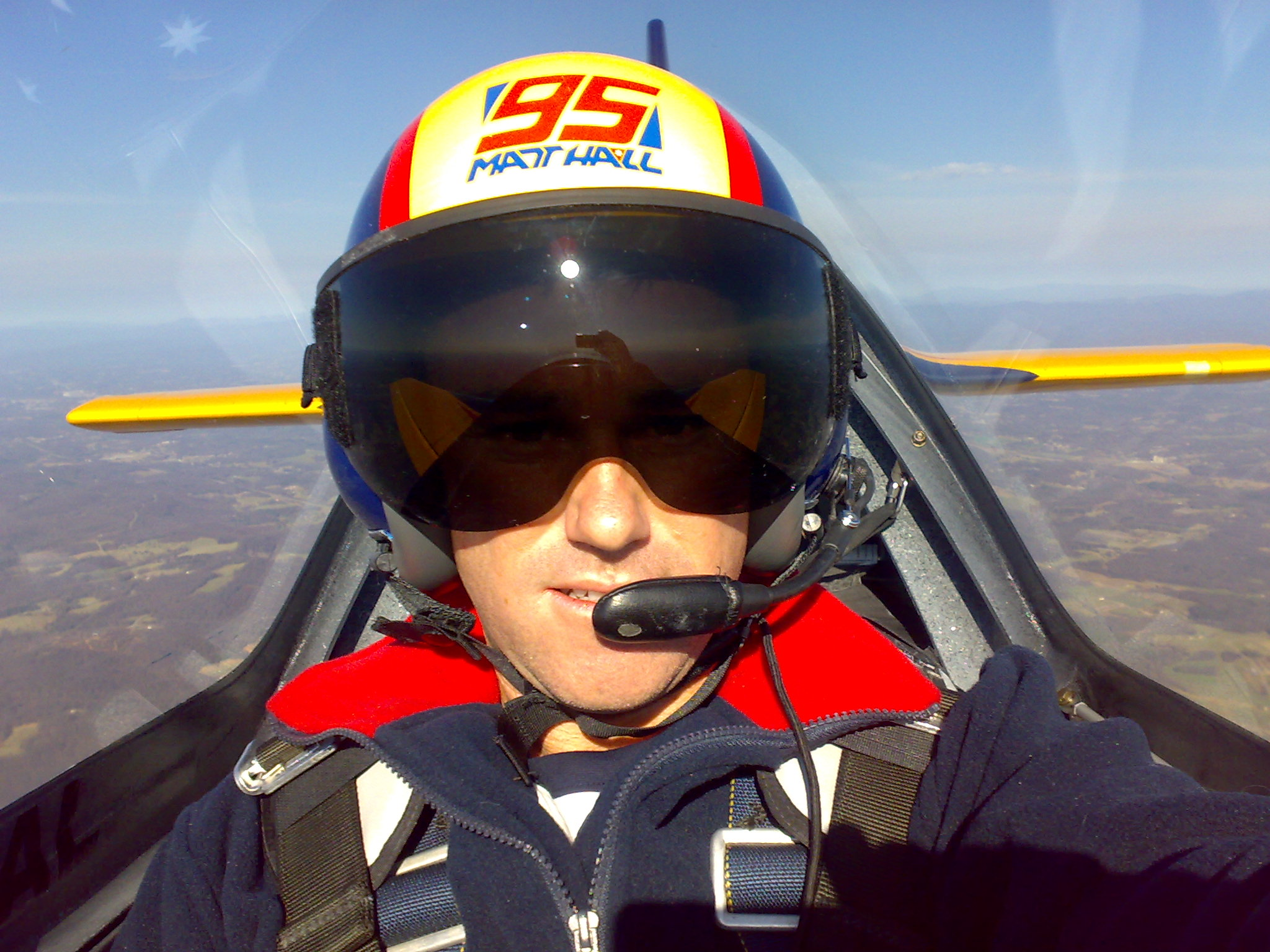
In flight

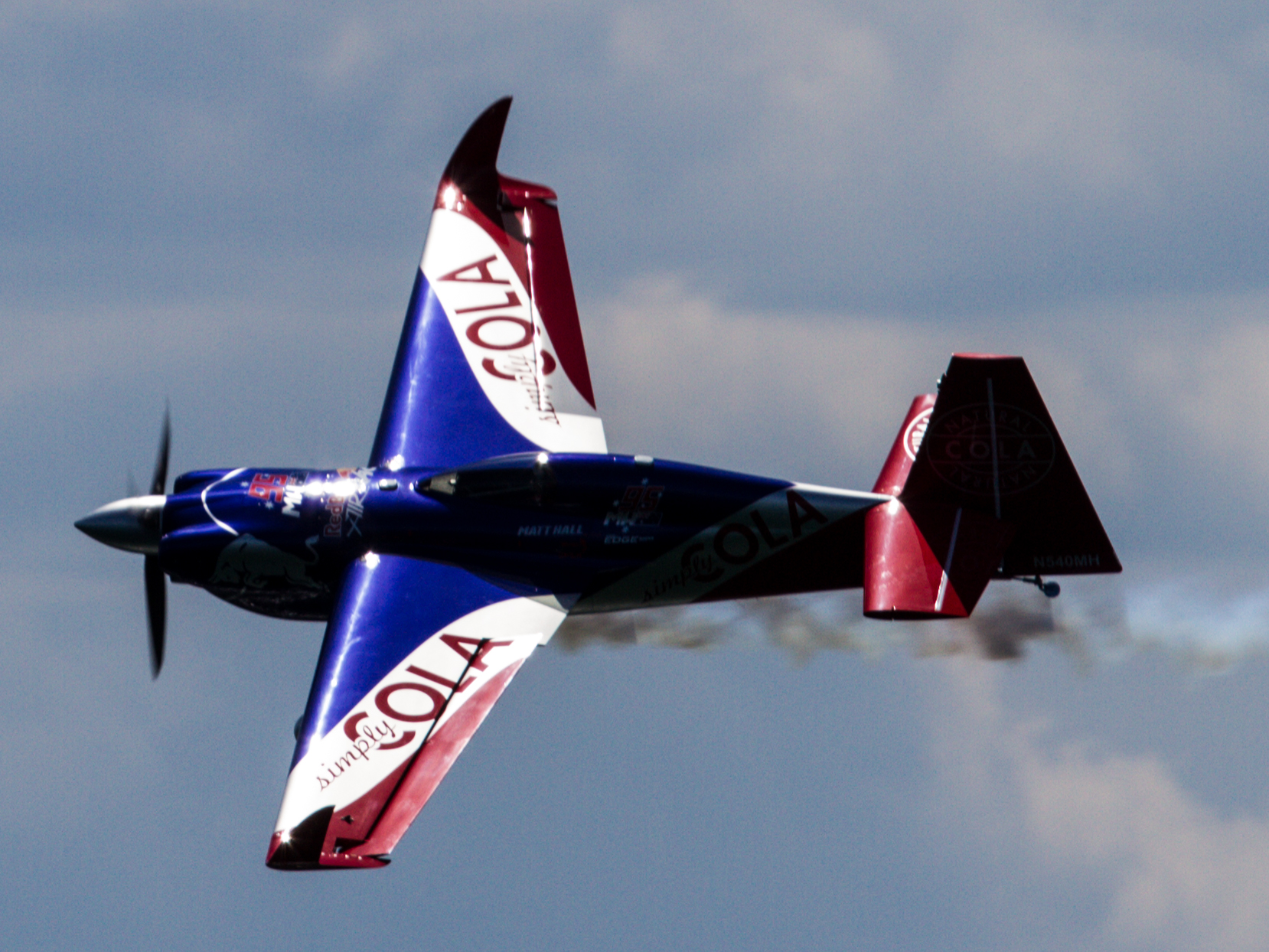
2017 Red Bull Air Race of Chiba – N540MH
