= Ueli Gegenschatz =

Swiss skydiver (1971–2009)

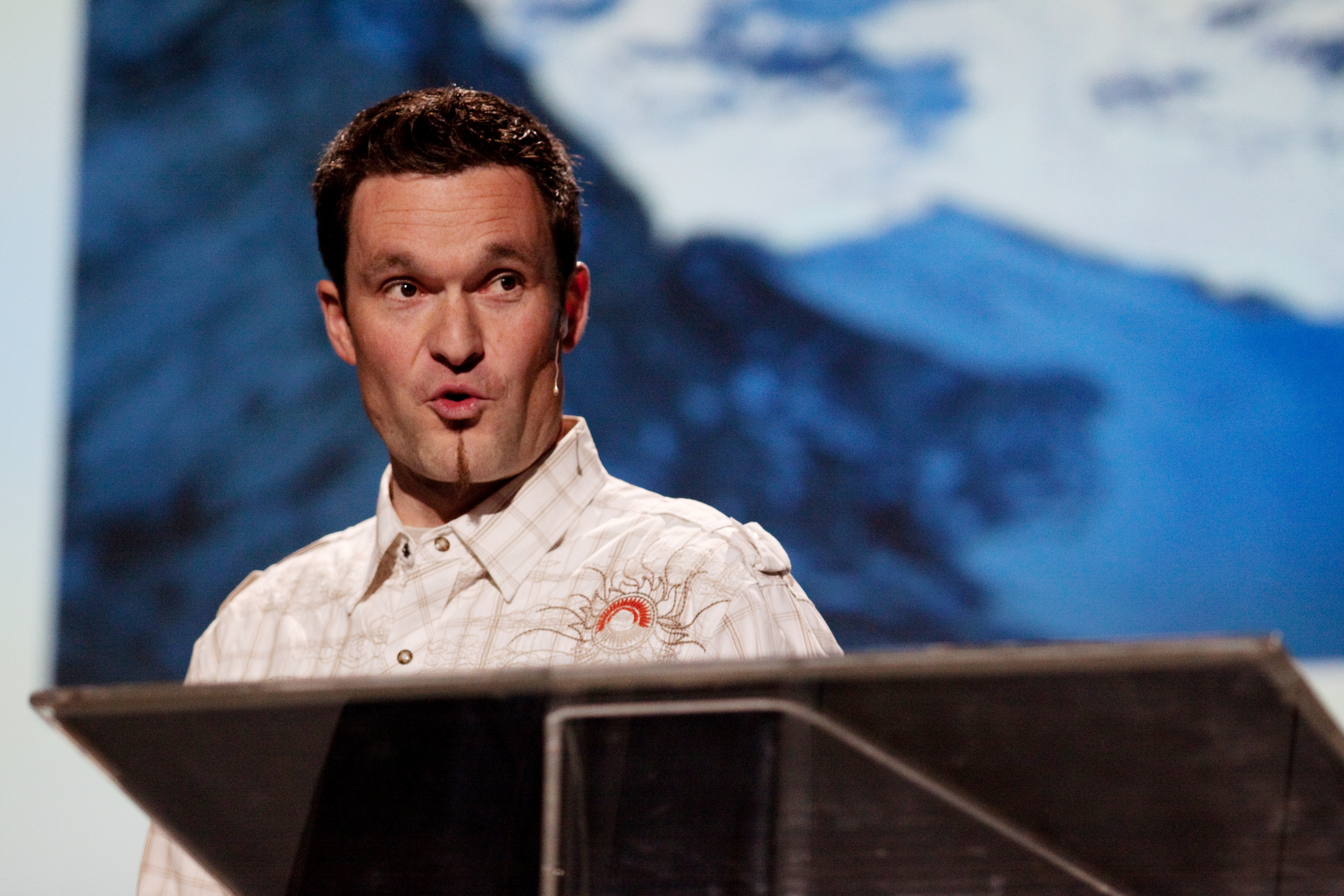
- Gegenschatz at TED 2009
- Born: January 3, 1971; Wald, Appenzell Ausserrhoden, Switzerland
- Died: November 13, 2009 (aged 38); Zurich, Switzerland
- Cause of death: Multiple injuries from high-altitude fall
- Occupations: Paratrooper, BASE jumper, public speaker, insurance agent
- Known for: First BASE jumper to jump from the north face of the Eiger (2000), and from the Matterhorn (2005)

Ueli "The Sputnik" Gegenschatz (January 3, 1971, Wald – November 13, 2009, Zurich) was a Swiss BASE jumper, paraglider and skydiver who made over 1,500 jumps in his career. Ueli Gegenschatz was known for his expert paragliding, skydiving and BASE jumping and Wingsuit flying, and was considered an idol of the Swiss BASE jumping scene.

== Biography ==
Ueli Gegenschatz was born in the Swiss canton of Appenzell. He completed his first parachute jump in the military preliminary course for long-distance scouts in 1989. Although Gegenschatz did not become a scout, he remained true to jumping: in 1990 he flew with a paraglider for the first time and from then on, as an amateur, he was part of the extended world elite. He would go on to make 1,500 jumps.

In 1997, he made his first object jump from a 1000-metre high rock face in Norway. A member of the Swiss national paragliding team for four years, Gegenschatz co-founded the Red Bull acro team in 1995.

Among his BASE jumping achievements were jumps off Eiffel Tower, Kuala Lumpur's Petronas Towers (22 times in one day) as well as jumps off of the Eiger, Mönch and Jungfrau peaks all in one day. In 2000, he and Felix Baumgartner completed a successful BASE jump from the Forth Road Bridge in Scotland, UK. The pair escaped in a dinghy to avoid the authorities as BASE jumping is not legal in the UK.

In 2000, he and Hannes Arch were the first BASE jumpers to jump from the north face of the Eiger, and in 2005, he was the first to jump from the Matterhorn. In 2008, he reached a velocity of 250 km per hour on a wingsuit jump in County Galway, Ireland. The stunt, covering 17km claimed to be faster than an airplane taking the same distance.

While a world-class extreme athlete, Gegenschatz estimated he spent 60 percent of his time working as an insurance agent, working nights and weekends to be able to spend the rest of his time pursuing his career in extreme sports. In February 2009, Gegenschatz spoke about overcoming fears and extreme wingsuit flying at the TED 2009 event in Long Beach, California.

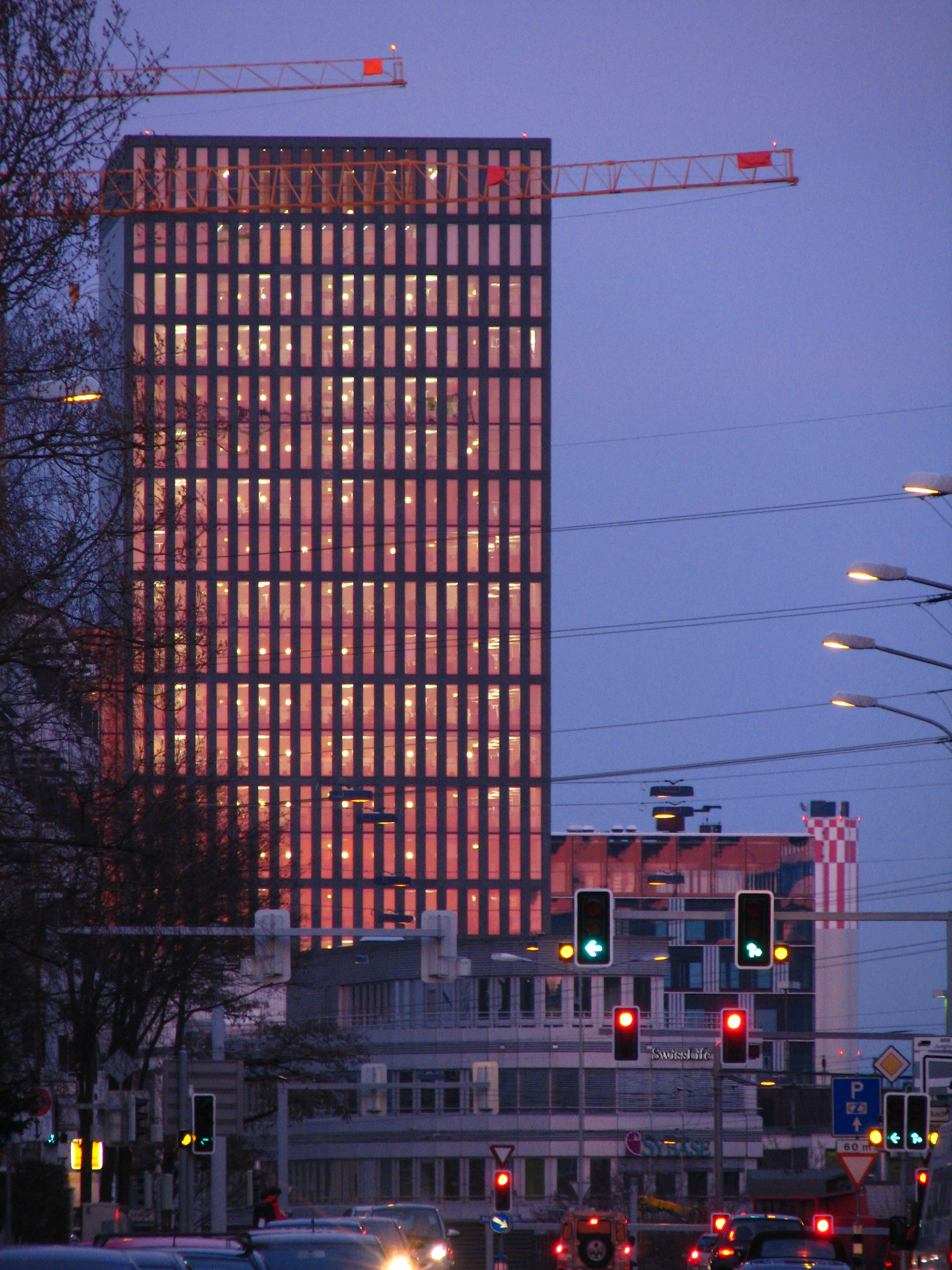
Zürich's Sunrise Tower, the structure where Gegenschatz would make his final BASE jump

=== Final BASE jump ===
On November 11, 2009, during a BASE jump for Red Bull from the 90 m (300 ft) Sunrise Tower in Zurich, Switzerland, Gegenschatz lost control of his parachute after he was blown by a gust of wind. He hit the ground and was seriously injured. Gegenschatz was conscious upon landing and reportedly apologized for his failed jump. He died two days later of internal injuries on November 13.

=== Aftermath ===
Gegenschatz's death during a Red Bull sponsored stunt highlighted the relationship between sponsorship and risk taking in extreme sports. His was the third death of a Red Bull sponsored extreme sports athlete that year (the second death in Switzerland) after Shane McConkey and Eli Thompson. His death led to increased criticism of the company's marketing tactics, and was later featured in The Dark Side of Red Bull - The Perils of Extreme Sports, a documentary by German public broadcaster Deutsche Welle. His death also features on "Dangerous Games: Red Bull's Killer PR", a podcast by Tortoise Media.

== See also ==
- List of deaths from wingsuit flying
- Hannes Arch, Red Bull athlete whom Gegenschatz shared the first Eiger BASE jump record with
