= 2016 Red Bull Air Race World Championship =

Eleventh Red Bull Air Race World Championship series

Seasons
- ← 2015 2017 →

Location

The 2016 Red Bull Air Race World Championship was the eleventh Red Bull Air Race World Championship series.

== Aircraft and pilots ==
=== Master Class ===
Team	No.	Pilot	Aircraft	Rounds
Cristian Bolton Racing	5	(Chile) Cristian Bolton	Zivko Edge 540 V2	7–8
Team Sonka	8	(Czech Republic) Martin Šonka	Zivko Edge 540 V3	All
Breitling Racing Team	9	(United Kingdom) Nigel Lamb	MX Aircraft MXS-R	All
Breitling Racing Team	11	(France) Mikaël Brageot	Master Mentoring Program	
Breitling Racing Team	12	(France) François Le Vot	Zivko Edge 540 V2	All
Team Chambliss	10	(United States) Kirby Chambliss	Zivko Edge 540 V3	All
Team Spielberg	18	(Czech Republic) Petr Kopfstein	Zivko Edge 540 V3	All
Matthias Dolderer Racing	21	(Germany) Matthias Dolderer	Zivko Edge 540 V3	All
Hannes Arch Racing 22	22	(Austria) Hannes Arch	Zivko Edge 540 V3	1–6
Team Velarde	26	(Spain) Juan Velarde	Zivko Edge 540 V2	All
Team Hamilton	27	(France) Nicolas Ivanoff	Zivko Edge 540 V2	All
Team Falken	31	(Japan) Yoshihide Muroya	Zivko Edge 540 V3	All
Peter Podlunšek Racing	37	(Slovenia) Peter Podlunšek	Zivko Edge 540 V2	All
Team Garmin	84	(Canada) Pete McLeod	Zivko Edge 540 V3	All
Matt Hall Racing	95	(Australia) Matt Hall	MX Aircraft MXS-R	1–7
Team Goulian	99	(United States) Michael Goulian	Zivko Edge 540 V2	All

==== Pilot changes ====
- Reigning champion Paul Bonhomme and inaugural champion Péter Besenyei retired from the sport following the final round of the 2015 season.
- Petr Kopfstein and Peter Podlunšek made their debuts in the Master Class, having finished equal 1st and 5th respectively in the previous years' Challenger Class standings.

==== Mid-season changes ====
- Cristian Bolton stepped up to the Master Class following the death of Hannes Arch before the Indianapolis round of the series.

=== Challenger Class ===
- All Challenger Cup Pilots used an Extra 330LX.

No.	Pilot	Rounds
33	(France) Mélanie Astles	2–8
77	(Brazil) Francis Barros	1–3
62	(Germany) Florian Bergér	1–2, 4–6, 8
5	(Chile) Cristian Bolton	1–5
48	(United States) Kevin Coleman	1–3, 5–8
6	(Poland) Luke Czepiela	1, 3–4, 6–8
24	(United Kingdom) Ben Murphy	1, 3–8
17	(Sweden) Daniel Ryfa	1–2, 4–6, 8

==== Pilot changes ====
- Mélanie Astles, Kevin Coleman, Luke Czepiela and Ben Murphy will make their debuts in the Challenger Class. Astles will become the first female pilot to compete in a Red Bull Air Race event.

== Race calendar and results ==
The eight-event calendar for the 2016 season was announced on 16 December 2015.

Round	Country	Location	Date	Fastest Qualifying	Winning Pilot	Winning Aircraft	Winning Challenger	Report
1	United Arab Emirates	Abu Dhabi	11–12 March	(Australia) Matt Hall	(France) Nicolas Ivanoff	Zivko Edge 540	(Sweden) Daniel Ryfa	report
2	Austria	Red Bull Ring, Spielberg	23–24 April	(Spain) Juan Velarde	(Germany) Matthias Dolderer	Zivko Edge 540	(Germany) Florian Bergér	report
3	Japan	Makuhari, Chiba	4–5 June	cancelled	(Japan) Yoshihide Muroya	Zivko Edge 540	(Chile) Cristian Bolton	report
4	Hungary	Budapest	16–17 July	cancelled	(Germany) Matthias Dolderer	Zivko Edge 540	(Sweden) Daniel Ryfa	report
5	United Kingdom	Ascot Racecourse, Ascot	13–14 August	(Germany) Matthias Dolderer	(Australia) Matt Hall	MX Aircraft MXS	(United States) Kevin Coleman	report
6	Germany	Lausitzring, Klettwitz	3–4 September	(United Kingdom) Nigel Lamb	(Australia) Matt Hall	MX Aircraft MXS	(Germany) Florian Bergér	report
7	United States	Indianapolis Motor Speedway, Indiana	1–2 October	(Japan) Yoshihide Muroya	(Germany) Matthias Dolderer	Zivko Edge 540	(Poland) Luke Czepiela	report
8	United States	Las Vegas Motor Speedway, Las Vegas	15–16 October	cancelled due to high winds				report

== Championship standings ==
=== Master Class ===
Master Class scoring system

Position	**1st**	**2nd**	**3rd**	**4th**	**5th**	**6th**	**7th**	**8th**	**9th**	**10th**	**11–14th**
Points	15	12	9	7	6	5	4	3	2	1	0

Pos.	Pilot	ABU (United Arab Emirates)	SPE (Austria)	CHI (Japan)	BUD** (Hungary)	ASC (United Kingdom)	LAU (Germany)	IND (United States)	LVG (United States)	Points
1	(Germany) Matthias Dolderer	2	1	8	1	**2**	2	1	C	80.25
2	(Australia) Matt Hall	**9**	5	7	3	1	1	4		55.75
3	(Austria) Hannes Arch †	EX *	2	6	2	3	5			41
4	(United Kingdom) Nigel Lamb	11	3	4	6	6	**10**	2	C	37.75
5	(France) Nicolas Ivanoff	1	7	DNS	7	7	7	6	C	35
6	(Japan) Yoshihide Muroya	8	13	1	5	8	14	**5**	C	31.5
7	(Czech Republic) Martin Šonka	DSQ	9	2	13	5	4	7	C	31
8	(Canada) Pete McLeod	7	4	12	9	13	3	3	C	30.5
9	(United States) Kirby Chambliss	5	6	3	4	9	8	DSQ	C	30.25
10	(United States) Michael Goulian	6	10	13	10	4	6	10	C	19.75
11	(Spain) Juan Velarde	10	**14**	5	8	11	9	8	C	14.25
12	(France) François Le Vot	3	12	10	14	12	12	12	C	10
13	(Slovenia) Peter Podlunšek	12	8	11	11	10	13	11	C	4
14	(Czech Republic) Petr Kopfstein	13	11	9	12	14	11	9	C	4
15	(Chile) Cristian Bolton							13	C	0
Pos.	Pilot	ABU (United Arab Emirates)	SPE (Austria)	CHI (Japan)	BUD (Hungary)	ASC (United Kingdom)	LAU (Germany)	IND (United States)	LVG (United States)	Points

Colour	Result
Gold	Winner
Silver	Second place
Bronze	Third place
Green	Points classification
Blue	Non-points classification
Blue	Non-classified finish (NC)
Purple	Retired, not classified (Ret)
Red	Did not qualify (DNQ)
Red	Did not pre-qualify (DNPQ)
Black	Disqualified (DSQ)
White	Did not start (DNS)
White	Withdrew (WD)
White	Race cancelled (C)
Blank	Did not practice (DNP)
Blank	Did not arrive (DNA)
Blank	Excluded (EX)

**Bold** – Fastest Qualifying Pilot

* Arch finished 4th but was later excluded from the results; thus the points for 4th place were not awarded to any pilot.
** The final four wasn't held because of bad weather, 75% of points were awarded for this situation.

=== Challenger Class ===
Challenger Class scoring system

Position	**1st**	**2nd**	**3rd**	**4th**	**5th**	**6th**
Points	10	8	6	4	2	0

Pos.	Pilot	ABU (United Arab Emirates)	SPE (Austria)	CHI (Japan)	BUD (Hungary)	ASC (United Kingdom)	LAU (Germany)	IND (United States)	LVG (United States)	Drop	Points
1	(Germany) Florian Bergér	3	1		4	2	1		C	10	28
2	(Sweden) Daniel Ryfa	1	3		1	5	4		C	6	26
3	(United States) Kevin Coleman	2	2	2		1	6	4	C	12	26
4	(Poland) Luke Czepiela	5		3	3		2	1	C	14	26
5	(Chile) Cristian Bolton		4	1	6	3					20
6	(United Kingdom) Ben Murphy	4		5	2	6	3	3	C	6	20
7	(France) Mélanie Astles		6	4	5	4	5	2	C	4	16
8	(Brazil) Francis Barros	DSQ	5	6							2
Pos.	Pilot	ABU (United Arab Emirates)	SPE (Austria)	CHI (Japan)	BUD (Hungary)	ASC (United Kingdom)	LAU (Germany)	IND (United States)	LVG (United States)	Drop	Points
