= Martin Šonka =

Czech aviator

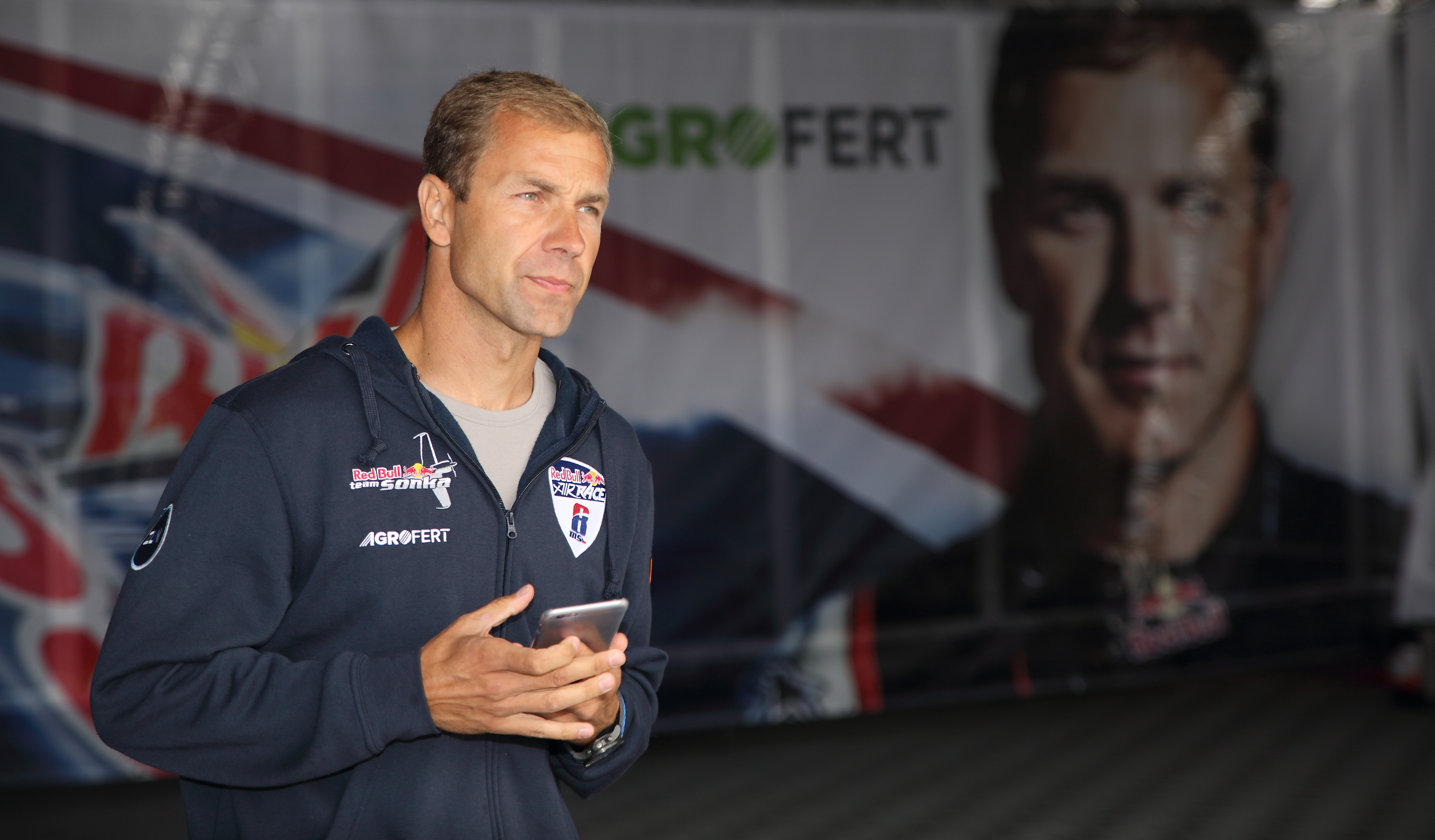
- Born: 26 March 1978 (age 48); Dvůr Králové nad Labem, Czechoslovakia
- Education: University of Defence
- Aviation career
- Air force: Czech Air Force

Racing career
- First race: 2010
- Best position: 1st (2018)
- Aircraft: Zivko Edge 540 V3
- Website: martin-sonka.cz

Martin Šonka (born 26 March 1978 in Dvůr Králové nad Labem) is a Czech aerobatics (unlimited) and a former fighter pilot in the Czech Air Force. He has raced in Red Bull Air Race World Championship since 2010, becoming the World Champion in the 2018 Red Bull Air Race World Championship season.

== Biography ==
=== Beginnings ===
Martin Šonka began his aviation career in 1997. In this year he flew a glider for the first time and started his studies at University of Defence in Brno as a pilot. In 1999 he gained his Private Pilot Licence. Between 2001 and 2005 he attended Jan Perner Transport Faculty at University of Pardubice (Department of Transport Management, Marketing and Logistics). He finished his studies with a master's degree in 2005.

=== The Czech Air Force ===
His military career started in 2000 in Pardubice. Two years after he moved to the air base in Náměšť nad Oslavou and in 2006 to 21st Tactical Air Force Base at Čáslav where he began flying L-159 Alca. In 2012 he has finished the type rating for the Saab JAS 39 Gripen. In 2014 he was forced to leave the army due to his busy racing schedule.

=== Aerobatics ===
In 2005 he became a member of the Czech national aerobatic team. He used to fly Su-31, however in the past few years he is training and competing with Extra 300SR.

== Red Bull Air Race ==
In 2009 Šonka passed all Red Bull Air Race qualifying camps and gained The Red Bull Air Race Super Licence. Then he was nominated for a 2010 season rookie.

== Achievements ==
Red Bull Air Race

(Czech Republic) Martin Šonka at the Red Bull Air Race World Championship
Year	1	2	3	4	5	6	7	8	Points	Wins	Rank
2010	(United Arab Emirates); 13th	(Australia); 14th	(Brazil); 13th	(Canada); 12th	(United States); 11th	(Germany); 11th	(Hungary); CAN	(Portugal); CAN	2	0	14th
Series not held between 2011 and 2013
2014	(United Arab Emirates); 7th	(Croatia); 6th	(Malaysia); 6th	(Poland); 10th	(United Kingdom); 9th	(United States); 7th	(United States); 8th	(Austria); 3rd	18	0	8th
2015	(United Arab Emirates); 10th	(Japan); 10th	(Croatia); 2nd	(Hungary); 3rd	(United Kingdom); 7th	(Austria); 4th	(United States); 4th	(United States); 8th	29	0	4th
2016	(United Arab Emirates); DSQ	(Austria); 9th	(Japan); 2nd	(Hungary); 13th	(United Kingdom); 5th	(Germany); 4th	(United States); 7th	(United States); CAN	31	0	7th
2017	(United Arab Emirates); 1st	(United States); 5th	(Japan); 3rd	(Hungary); 4th	(Russia); 9th	(Portugal); 1st	(Germany); 3rd	(United States); 4th	70	2	2nd
2018	(United Arab Emirates); 4th	(France); 8th	(Japan); 3rd	(Hungary); 1st	(Russia); 1st	(Austria); 1st	(United States); 10th	(United States); 1st	80	4	1st
2019	(United Arab Emirates); 2nd	(Russia); 3rd +2	(Hungary); 4th +3	(Japan); 13th +2	Season shortened				68	0	3rd

Legend: * CAN: Cancelled * DNP: Did not take part * DNS: Did not start * DSQ: Disqualified

2009

- World Championship, Unlimited - Free Style, Powered, 9th place
- Slovenian Nationals, Unlimited, Powered, 1st place
- World Air Games, Unlimited, Powered, 5th place

2008

- World Aerobatic Cup, Unlimited, Powered, 3rd place
- European Championship, Unlimited, Powered, 17th place
- National Championship, Unlimited, Powered, 1st place

2007

- World Championship, Unlimited, Powered, 29th place.
- National Championship, Unlimited, Powered, 2nd place

2006

- European Championship, Unlimited, Powered, 14th place
- National Championship, Unlimited, Powered, 3rd place

2005

- European Championship, Advanced, Powered, 14th place
- National Championship, Advanced, Powered, 4th place

2004

- National Championship, Sportsman, Powered, 1st place
- National Championship, Intermediate, Gliders, 1st place

2003

- National Championship, Sportsman, Gliders, 1st place

2002

- National Championship, Sportsman, Gliders, 3rd place

== Gallery ==
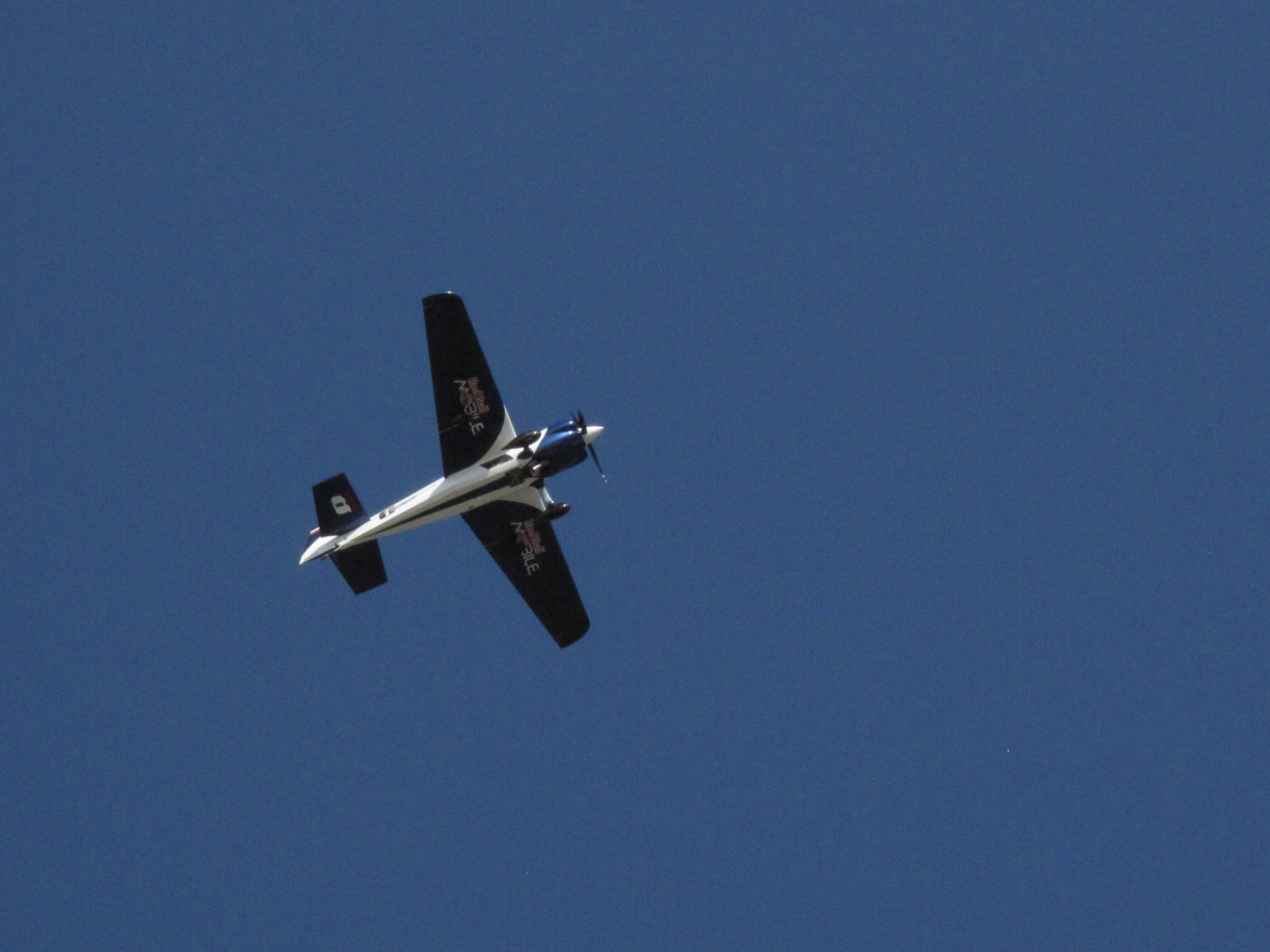
Šonka taking off from Jandakot airport for the final practice before the Perth Red Bull Air Race

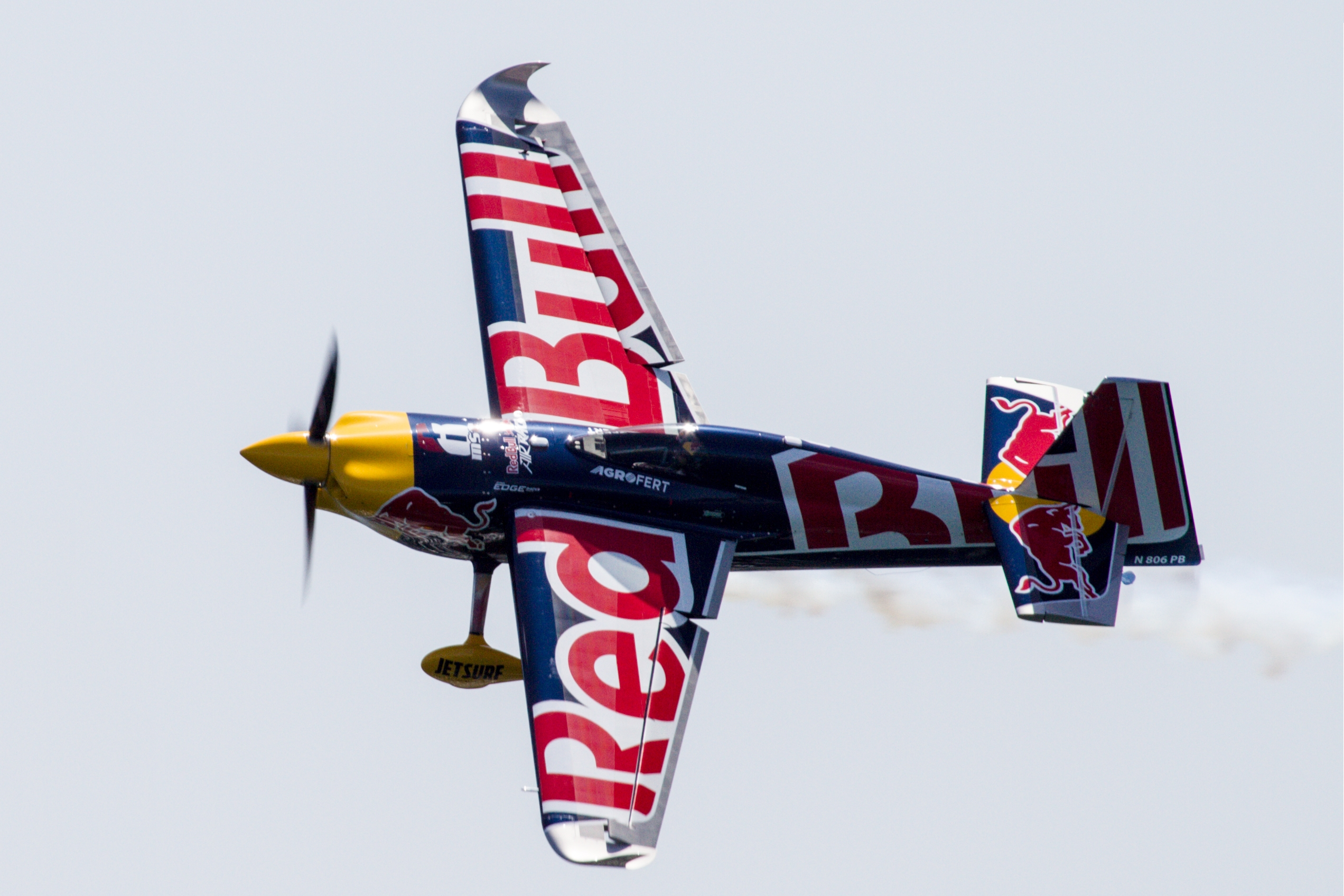
2017 Red Bull Air Race of Chiba - N806PB

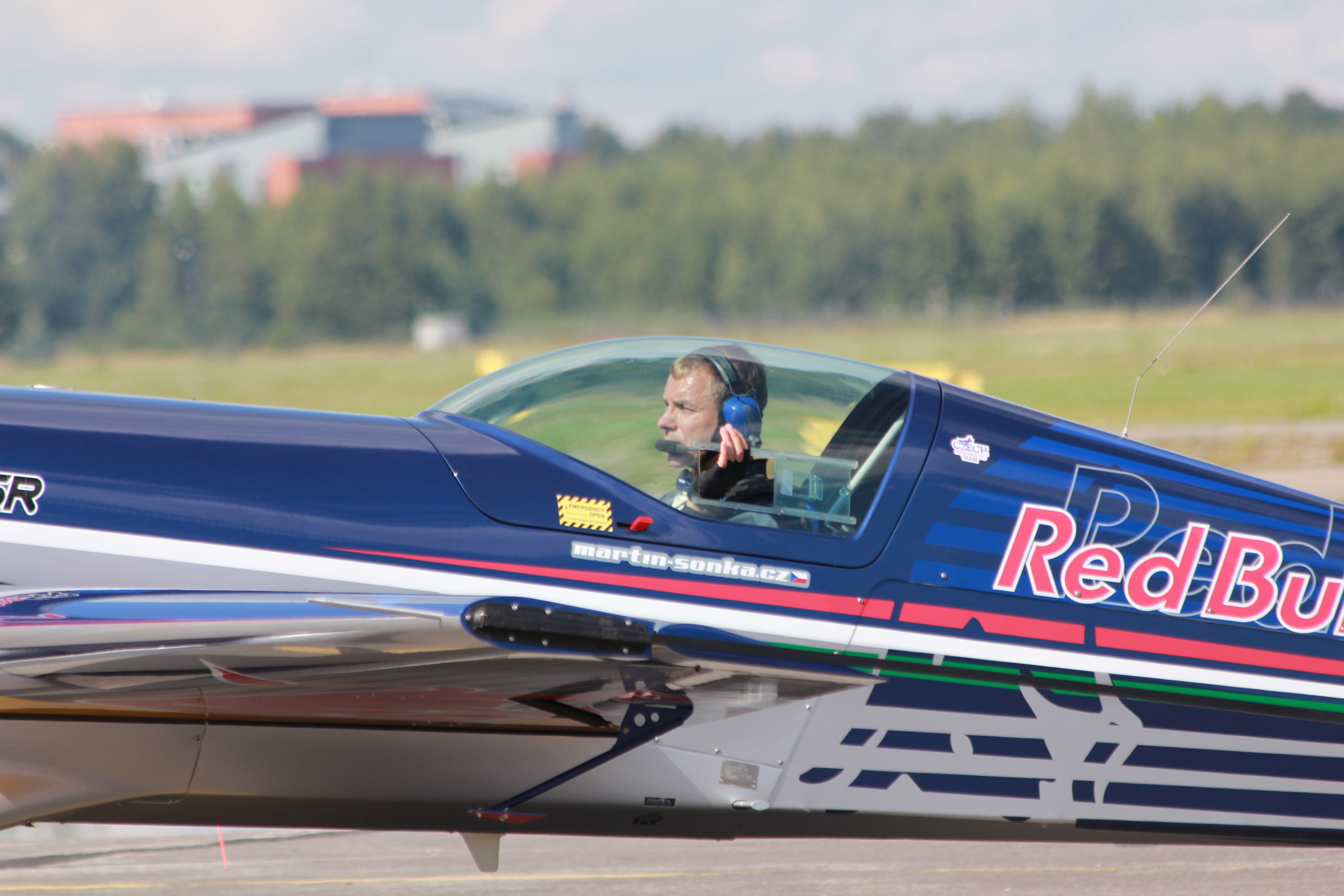
Šonka in the cockpit of his Extra 300SR aircraft at Helsinki-Malmi airport
