= Hannes Arch =

Austrian pilot (1967–2016)

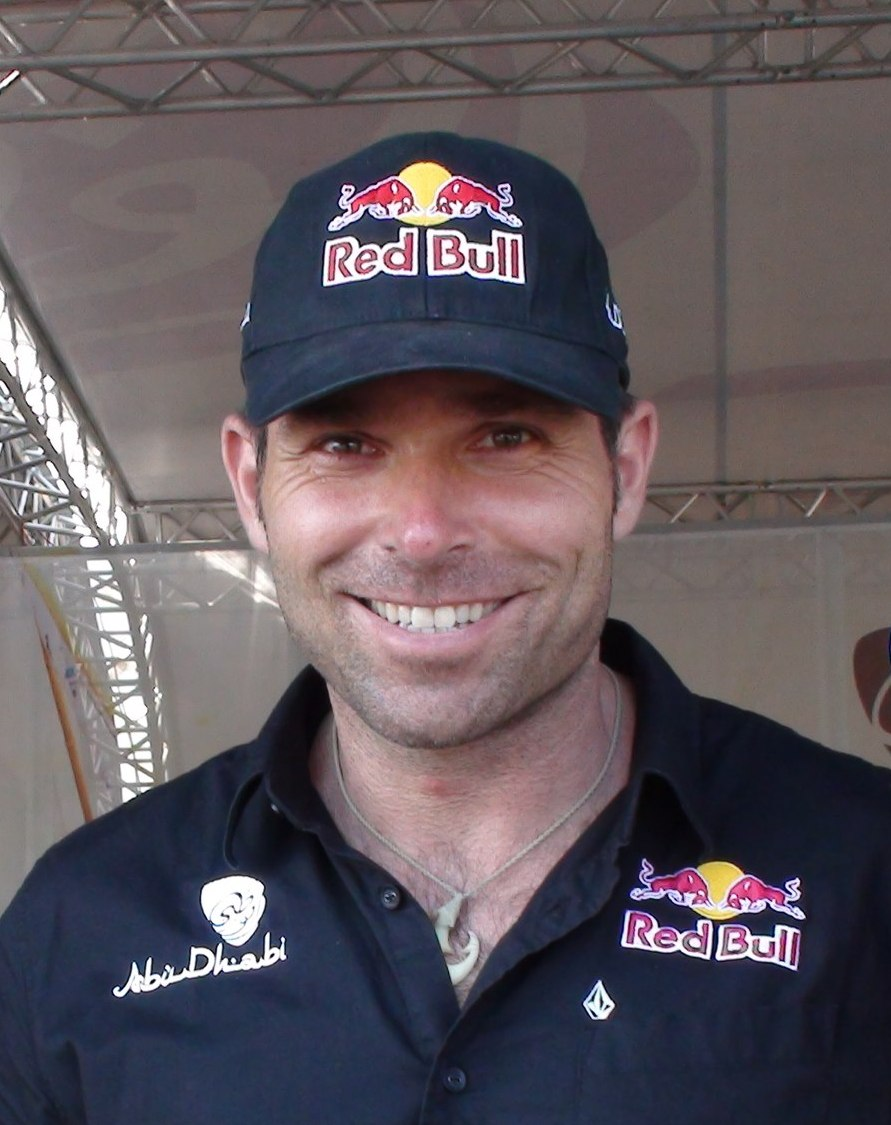
- Arch in 2010
- Born: 22 September 1967; Leoben, Styria, Austria
- Died: 8 September 2016 (aged 48); Heiligenblut am Großglockner, Carinthia, Austria
- Aviation career

Racing career
- First race: 2007
- Best position: 1st (2008)
- Aircraft: Zivko Edge 540
- Website: hannesarch.com

Hannes Arch (22 September 1967 – 8 September 2016) was an Austrian pilot who competed in the Red Bull Air Race World Championship from 2007 to 2016. Arch won the World Championship in the 2008 season.

== Life ==
Hannes Arch was born in Leoben, Austria in 1967. He grew up in Trofaiach, attended the BORG Eisenerz and most recently lived in the city of Salzburg. Since the 2007 season, the state-certified mountain and ski guide has been the first Austrian participant in the Red Bull Air Race World Championship, after winning a qualifying round in Phoenix (Arizona) in October 2006.

He contested his first race in the series on 6 April 2007 in Abu Dhabi (UAE), where he did not make it past the qualifying round. He achieved this for the first time in his second race in Rio de Janeiro on April 21, finishing fourth and scoring 3 points. However, he did not score any further points during the rest of the season, which meant he finished 10th overall.

His second season in the Red Bull Air Race World Championship in 2008 was much more successful: in the first five competitions, Arch achieved two second and third places as well as a fourth place, before achieving his first victory at the competition in Budapest on 19 and 20 August. After also winning the competition in Porto, he took the lead in the overall standings. On 1 November 2008, he was crowned World Champion of the 2008 Red Bull Air Race World Championship in Perth, Australia, with victory in qualifying.

Arch started the 2009 season with a victory in the first event of the season in Abu Dhabi; he achieved four podium places in six events during the season, never finished lower than fourth and ended the year as runner-up behind Paul Bonhomme.

Like most of the pilots in the series, he flew a Zivko Edge 540.

Arch has also made a name for himself in base jumping and caused quite a stir when he and Ueli Gegenschatz performed a base jump from the north face of the Eiger in 2000 and from the north face of the Matterhorn in 2003.

Since 2010, he was in a relationship with German stuntwoman and action model Miriam Höller.

In 2014, he was sponsored by YAVER under the leadership of Yaver Demir and achieved an impressive second place at the Red Bull Air Race in Abu Dhabi, completing the final 4 round with a time of 56.776 seconds.

In 2014, AKG Acoustics launched a professional headset for pilots, which Arch played a key role in developing.

== Death ==
Hannes Arch died on 8 September 2016 in a helicopter crash in the Austrian Alps during a helicopter supply flight to a remote mountain lodge, the Elberfelder Hut. Shortly after takeoff at about 9:15 p.m., the helicopter struck the side of a mountain. Arch died of a broken neck. Arch was accompanied in the helicopter by the mountain hut's owner Reinhard B., a 62-year-old German who ran the Alpine hut which Arch had delivered supplies to. The German was seriously injured in the crash but survived.

Hannes Arch was buried at a funeral attended by his closest relatives in Trofaiach on 13 September 2016.

== Red Bull X-Alps ==
Hannes made his mark on the paragliding scene inventing the grueling international competition known as the Red Bull X-Alps, taking the world's most elite paragliding pilots across the Alps from Austria to Monaco entirely by air or foot in a race against the clock. The event quickly gained a reputation as one of the world's toughest adventure races.

== Red Bull Air Race Results ==
(Austria) Hannes Arch at the Red Bull Air Race World Series
Year	1	2	3	4	5	6	7	8	9	10	11	12	Points	Wins	Rank
2007	(United Arab Emirates); DNQ	(Brazil); 4th	(United States); 10th	(Turkey); 11th	(Spain); CAN	(Switzerland); 12th	(United Kingdom); 11th	(Hungary); 10th	(Portugal); 12th	(United States); 10th	(Mexico); CAN	(Australia); 9th	3	0	10th
2008	(United Arab Emirates); 2nd	(United States); 4th	(United States); 3rd	(Sweden); CAN	(Netherlands); 2nd	(United Kingdom); 3rd	(Hungary); 1st	(Portugal); 1st	(Spain); CAN	(Australia); 3rd			61	2	1st
2009	(United Arab Emirates); 1st	(United States); 3rd	(Canada); 2nd	(Hungary); 4th	(Portugal); 2nd	(Spain); 4th							60	1	2nd
2010	(United Arab Emirates); 11th	(Australia); 1st	(Brazil); 1st	(Canada); 1st	(United States); 4th	(Germany); 1st	(Hungary); CAN	(Portugal); CAN					60	4	2nd
2014	(United Arab Emirates); 2nd	(Croatia); 1st	(Malaysia); 2nd	(Poland); 1st	(United Kingdom); 8th	(United States); 8th	(United States); 5th	(China); 4th					53	1	2nd
2015	United Arab Emirates; 4	Japan; 11	Croatia; 1	Hungary; 1	United Kingdom; 8	Austria; 12	United States; 9	United States; 5					34	2	3rd
2016	United Arab Emirates; EX	Austria; 2	Japan; 6	Hungary; 2	United Kingdom; 3	Germany; 5	United States; DNP	United States; DNP					41	0	3rd

Legend:

- CAN: Cancelled
- DNP: Did not participate
- DNQ: Did not qualify
- DNS: Did not show
- DQ: Disqualified
- NC: Not classified

== See also ==
- Competition aerobatics

Sporting positions
Preceded by Mike Mangold	Red Bull Air Race World Series Champion; 2008	Succeeded by Paul Bonhomme
