= Matthias Dolderer =

German air racer

Mattias Dolderer
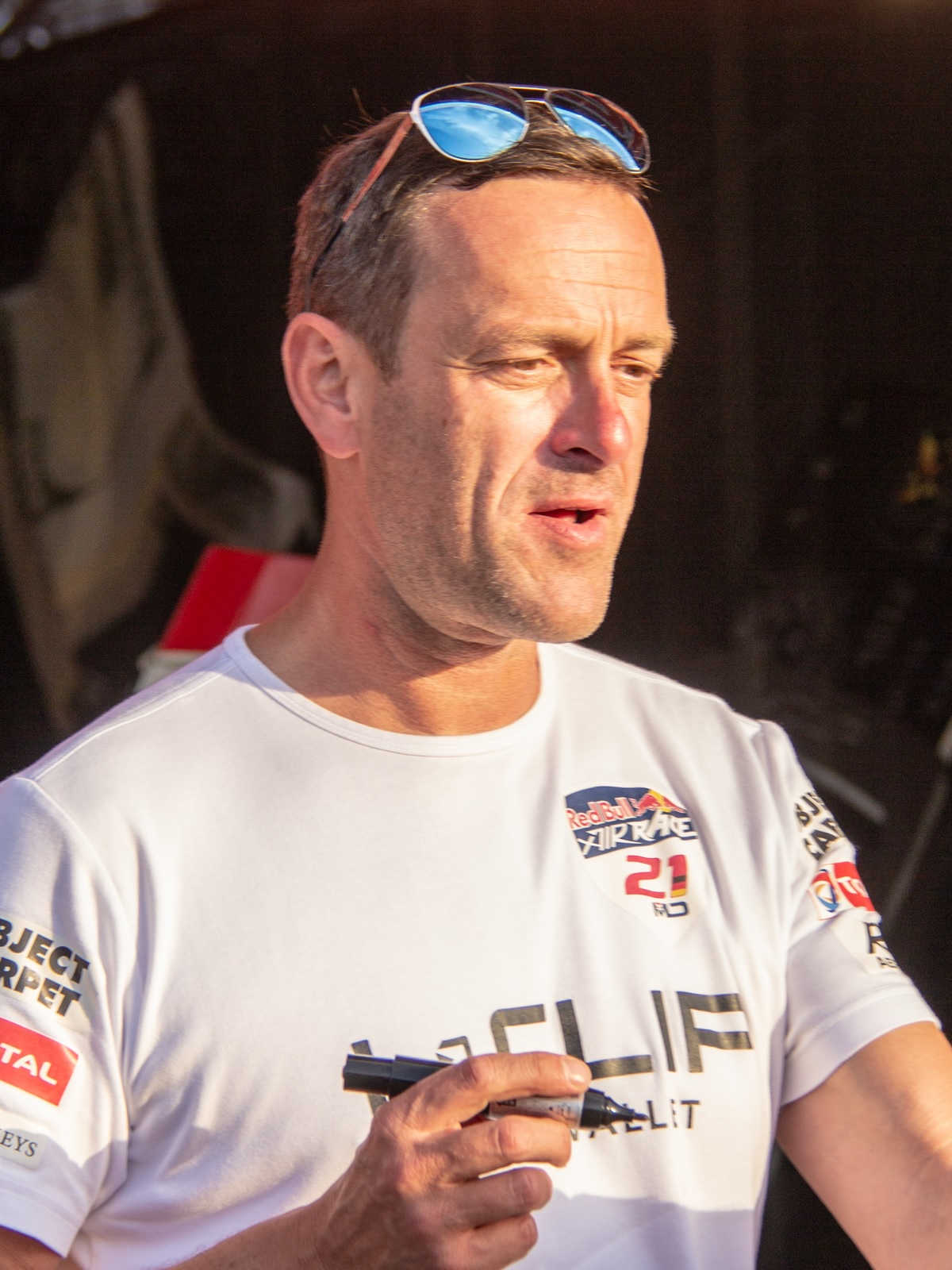
- Born: 15 September 1970 (age 56); Ochsenhausen, West Germany
- Aviation career

Racing career
- First race: 2009
- Best position: 1st (2016)
- Aircraft: Zivko Edge 540
- Website: matthiasdolderer.com

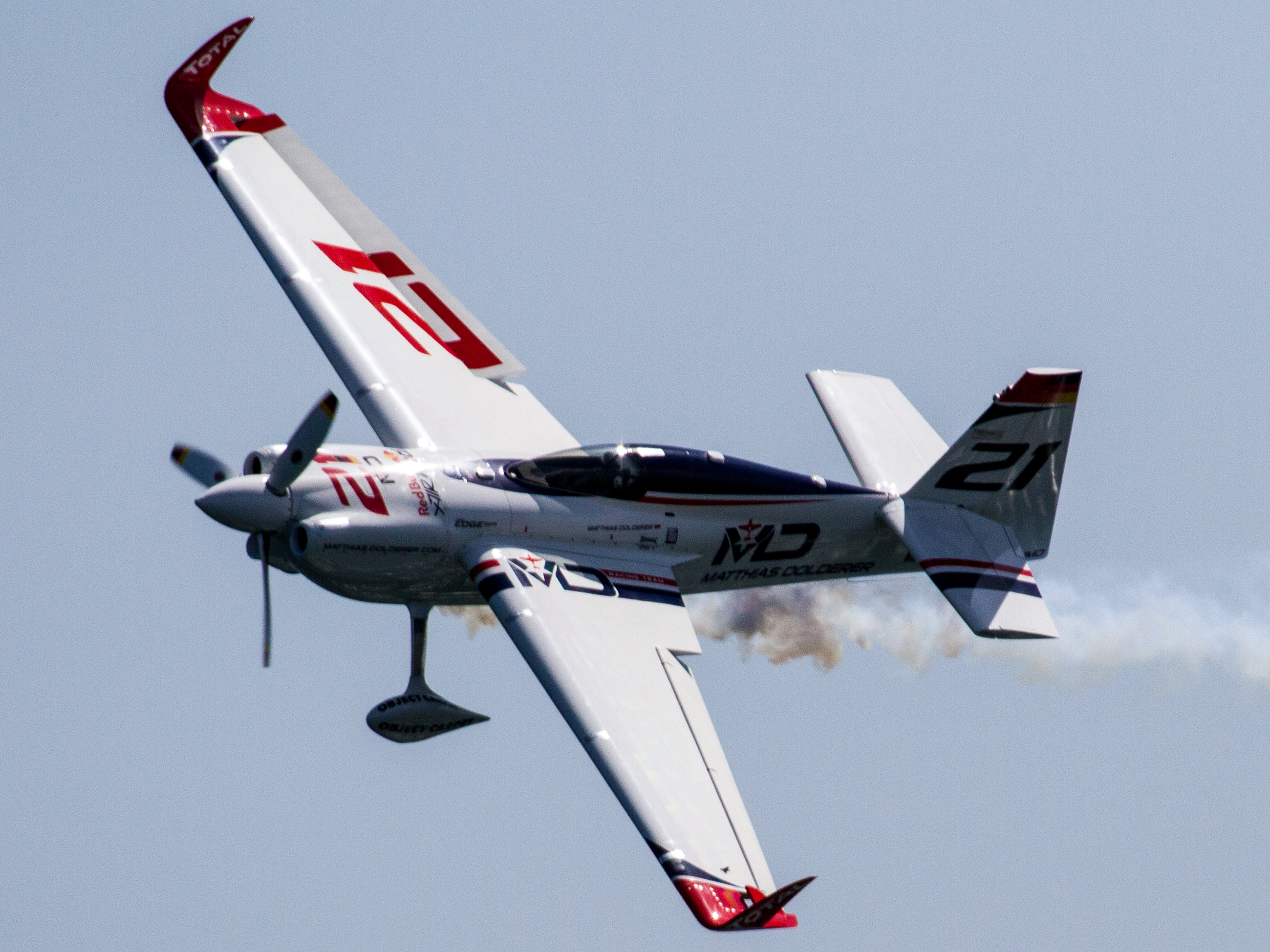
2017 Red Bull Air Race of Chiba - N721MD

Matthias Dolderer (born 15 September 1970 in Ochsenhausen, Baden Württemberg) is a German professional race pilot. He is the 2016 champion of the Red Bull Air Race.

== Flying career ==
=== Beginnings ===
Dolderer, who once colourfully compared the precision-flying of the Red Bull Air Race to trying to park a car in a garage while travelling at nearly 400 kilometres per hour, first went flying with his father when he was three years old. He was raised at his parents' flight school and at the early age of five became hooked on machines and fast cars making his first solo flight at 14. His life has revolved around aviation ever since. "Flying was my passion from the very first moment and my inspiration. I've spent my whole life in hangars, on airfields and in cockpits," says Dolderer.

Dolderer gained a glider and ultralight license at the age of 17 and the following year obtained his private pilot's license. Just a few days later he finished 3rd in the German Championships. From 1988 until 1991, Matthias Dolderer took part in four German and two European Championships, and the World Championships as a member of the national ultralight team. He ended his ultralight aviator career as the German Champion.

At the age of 21, Dolderer became the youngest flight teacher in Germany. He and his sister Verena took over Tannheim Airfield to continue their family's vision: 'To establish a meeting place for aviators, enthusiasts, amateurs as well as professionals.' The legendary Tannkosh event, Europe's biggest Fly-In, became a reality in 1993.

Dolderer has spent almost 300 days of his life in the cockpit in more than 150 different aircraft types, with 25,000 landings all over the world and has performed in many air shows across Europe since 1993. In 2002 he became an official pilot of the Flying Bulls, Austria, where he still performs with different aircraft.

=== Competition aerobatics ===
In 2006, Dolderer intensified his aerobatic activities to become a Red Bull Air Race pilot in the near future. Just one year later, he took part at the World Aerobatic Championship, category "Unlimited". In 2008, Dolderer made his breakthrough after hard training. He won the German Aerobatic Championship and achieved also top standings at international competitions such as the World Aerobatics Cup.

=== Red Bull Air Race pilot ===
Dolderer's achievements opened him the way for an invitation to attend the Red Bull Air Race qualification camp in Casarrubios, Spain, at the end of September 2008. Of the six candidates, five qualified for the "super license" required to compete in the world championship. Dolderer was one of four rookies selected for active race status. He flies a white Zivko Edge 540 V3 with the German colours of red, black and yellow on his tail and winglets. He flies under the number 21.

== Achievements ==
=== 2009-2010 ===
(Germany) Matthias Dolderer at the Red Bull Air Race World Championship
Year	1	2	3	4	5	6	7	8	Points	Wins	Rank
2009	(United Arab Emirates); 11th	(United States); 13th	(Canada); 13th	(Hungary); 5th	(Portugal); 6th	(Spain); 3rd			23	0	9th
2010	(United Arab Emirates); 7th	(Australia); 7th	(Brazil); 10th	(Canada); 5th	(United States); 10th	(Germany); 7th			26	0	8th

=== 2014- ===
Year	1	2	3	4	5	6	7	8	Points	Wins	Rank
2014	(United Arab Emirates); 6th	(Croatia); 9th	(Malaysia); 8th	(Poland); 11th	(United Kingdom); 4th	(United States); 4th	(United States); 3rd	(Austria); 11th	21	0	7th
2015	(United Arab Emirates); 9th	(Japan); 3rd	(Croatia); 6th	(Hungary); 7th	(United Kingdom); 10th	(Austria); 6th	(United States); 5th	(United States); 3rd	26	0	5th
2016	(United Arab Emirates); 2nd	(Austria); 1st	(Japan); 8th	(Hungary); 1st	(United Kingdom); 2nd	(Germany); 2nd	(United States); 1st	(United States); CAN	80,25	3	1st
2017	(United Arab Emirates); 4th	(United States); 3rd	(Japan); 4th	(Hungary); 13th	(Russia); 10th	(Portugal); 8th	(Germany); 12th	(United States); 2nd	39	0	7th
2018	(United Arab Emirates); 13th-DNF	(France); 2nd	(Japan); 8th	(Hungary); DNS	(Russia); 13th	(Austria); 9th	(United States); 11th	(United States); 13th	17	0	12th
2019	(United Arab Emirates); 11th								3	0	11th

Legend: * CAN: Cancelled * DNP: Did not take part * DNS: Did not start * DSQ: Disqualified * DNF: Did not finish

2008

- European Aerobatic Championships, "Unlimited" Category, 19th place
- World Aerobatics Cup, Czech Republic, "Unlimited" Category, 2nd place
- German Aerobatic Championships, "Unlimited" Category, 1st place
- German Aerobatic Championships, 4-minute freestyle program, 2nd place
- Qualified at the Red Bull Air Race Qualification Camp and selected to race in 2009

2007

- Participation German Aerobatic Championships "Unlimited" Category
- Participation World Aerobatics Championships "Unlimited" Category

2006

- Participation German Aerobatic Championship, "Advanced" Category

1991

- Microlight European Championships, German Champion

1990

- Microlight World Championships

1988

- Microlight European Championships

1988 till 1991

- Microlight German Championships

== See also ==
- Competition aerobatics
- FAI
