= Yoshihide Muroya =

Japanese aerobatics pilot

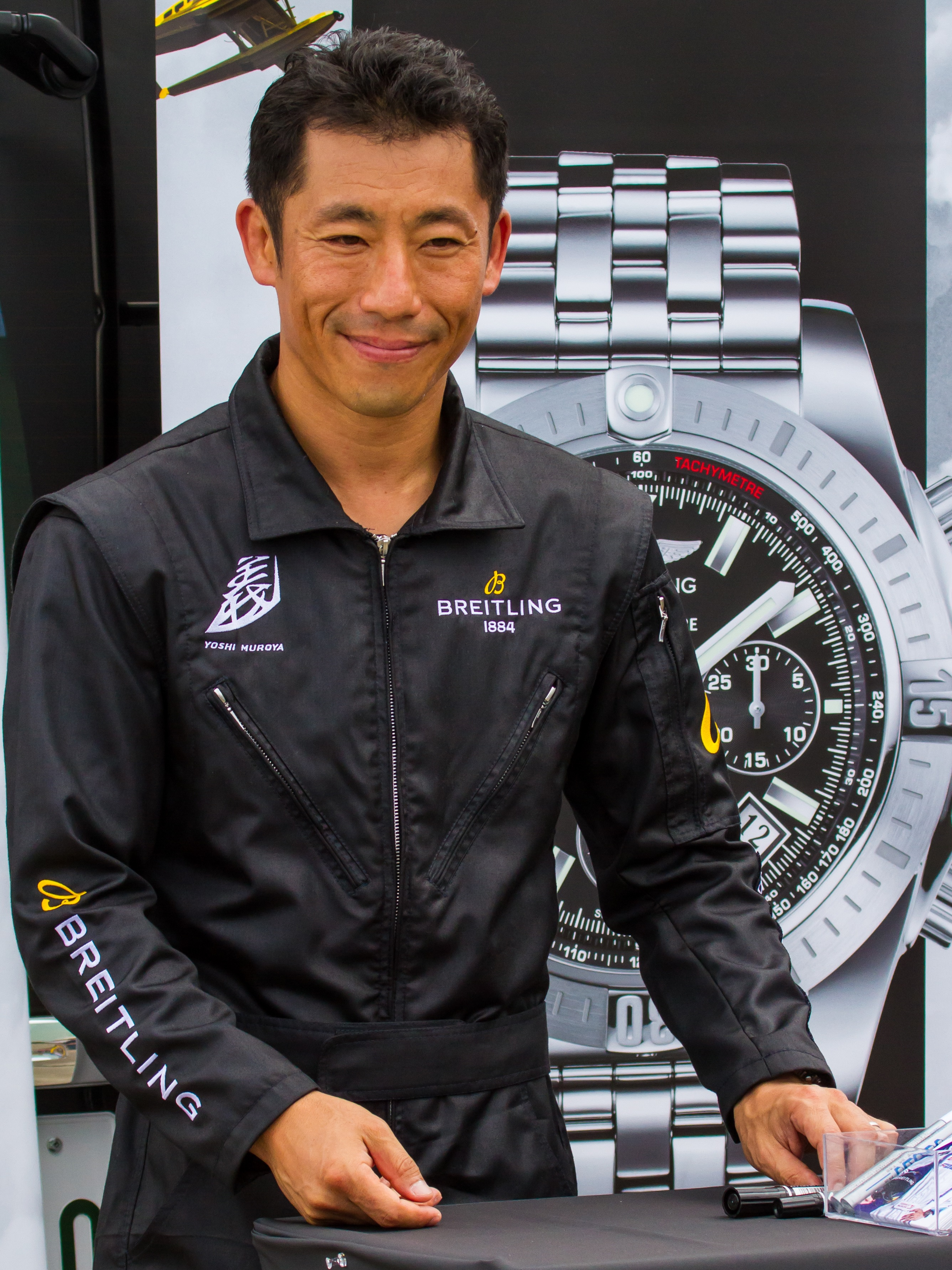
- Born: 27 January 1973 (age 53)
- Aviation career

Racing career
- First race: 2009
- Best position: 1st (2017)
- Aircraft: Zivko Edge 540
- Website: yoshi-muroya.jp

Yoshihide "Yoshi" Muroya (室屋 義秀, Muroya Yoshihide; born 27 January 1973) is a Japanese aerobatics pilot and race pilot of the Red Bull Air Race World Championship. He started glider flight training in 1991 because it was an inexpensive way to fly. Muroya went to the United States privately to earn his airplane license at the age of twenty.

After that, he worked long hours to earn enough money to get his training in the United States for a period of two months a year. At the same time, he continued glider training in Japan and learned long-distance flight techniques in Australia.

In 2009 he participated in the Red Bull Air Race World Championship as first Japanese and first Asian pilot. Special Team Mate Robert Fry joined as Team coordinator. In the final race in Barcelona, Spain he took 6th place. In 2017 he became Red Bull Air Race's World Champion.

Until now, he has held some 170 air-shows over 12 years without incident.

In 2021, Muroya partnered with Lexus to launch Lexus/Pathfinder Air Racing, a joint team competing in the Air Race World Championship.

== Racing record ==
=== Red Bull Air Race World Championship ===
(Japan) Yoshihide Muroya at the Red Bull Air Race World Championship
Year	1	2	3	4	5	6	7	8	Points	Wins	Rank
2009	(United Arab Emirates); 13th	(United States); 11th	(Canada); 14th	(Hungary); 12th	(Portugal); 10th	(Spain); 6th			9	0	14th
2010	(United Arab Emirates); 10th	(Australia); 9th	(Brazil); 12th	(Canada); DNS	(United States)	(Germany); 12th	(Hungary); CAN	(Portugal); CAN	5	0	12th
Series not held between 2011 and 2013
2014	(United Arab Emirates); 9th	(Croatia); 3rd	(Malaysia); 10th	(Poland); 12th	(United Kingdom); 6th	(United States); 9th	(United States); 9th	(Austria); 9th	10	0	9th
2015	(United Arab Emirates); 6th	(Japan); 8th	(Croatia); 10th	(Hungary); 9th	(United Kingdom); 3rd	(Austria); 10th	(United States); 3rd	(United States); 4th	23	0	6th
2016	(United Arab Emirates); 7th	(Austria); 14th	(Japan); 1st	(Hungary); 5th	(United Kingdom); 8th	(Germany); 14th	(United States); 5th	(United States); CAN	31.5	1	6th
2017	(United Arab Emirates); 13th	(United States); 1st	(Japan); 1st	(Hungary); 3rd	(Russia); 13th	(Portugal); 6th	(Germany); 1st	(United States); 1st	74	4	1st
2018	(United Arab Emirates); 2nd	(France); 4th	(Japan); 14th	(Hungary); 11th	(Russia); 8th	(Austria); 2nd	(United States); 12th	(United States); 5th	40	0	5th
2019	(United Arab Emirates); 1st								28	1	1st

Legend: * CAN: Cancelled * DNP: Did not take part * DNS: Did not start * DSQ: Disqualified

== Gallery ==
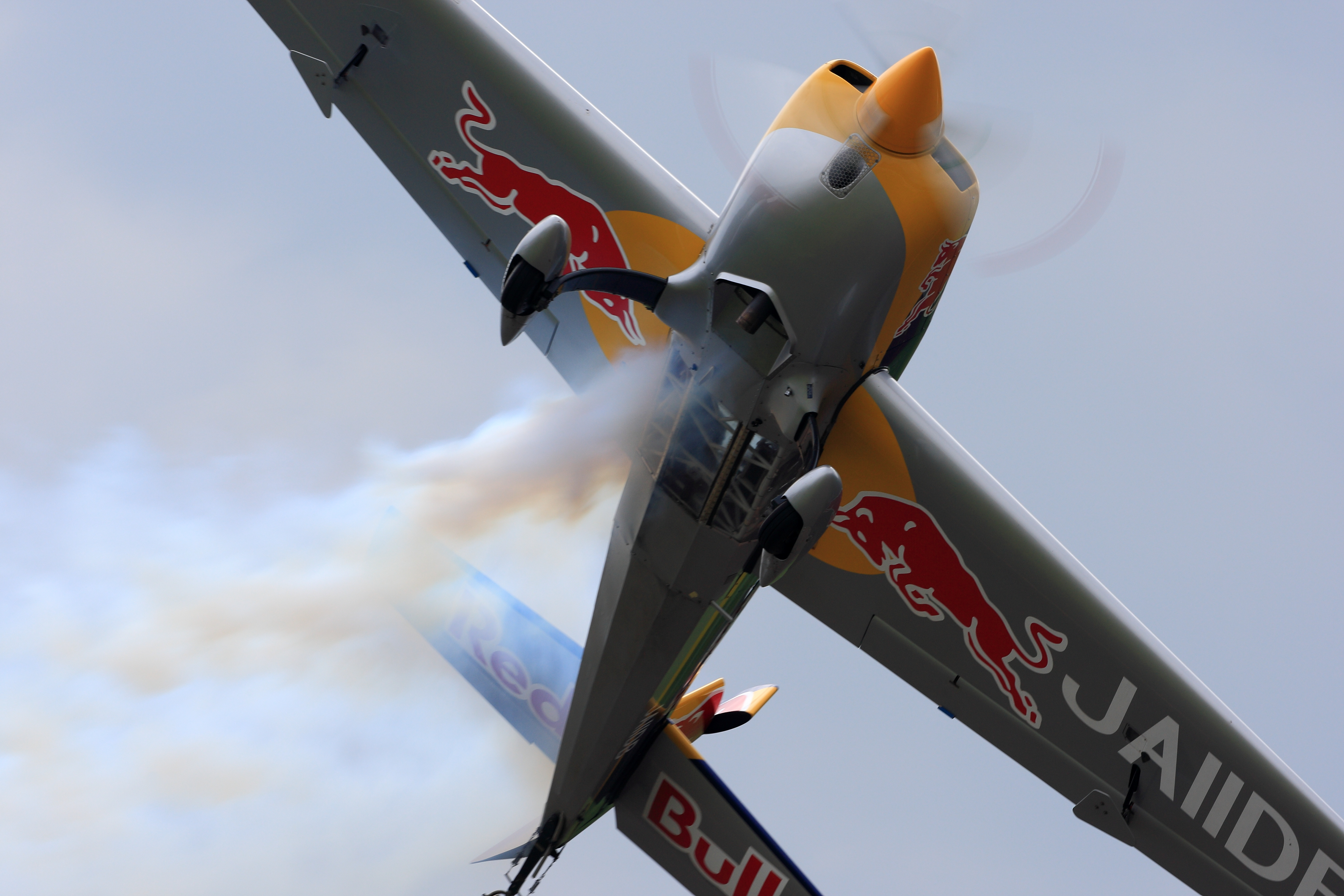
Aerobatics by Extra 300S

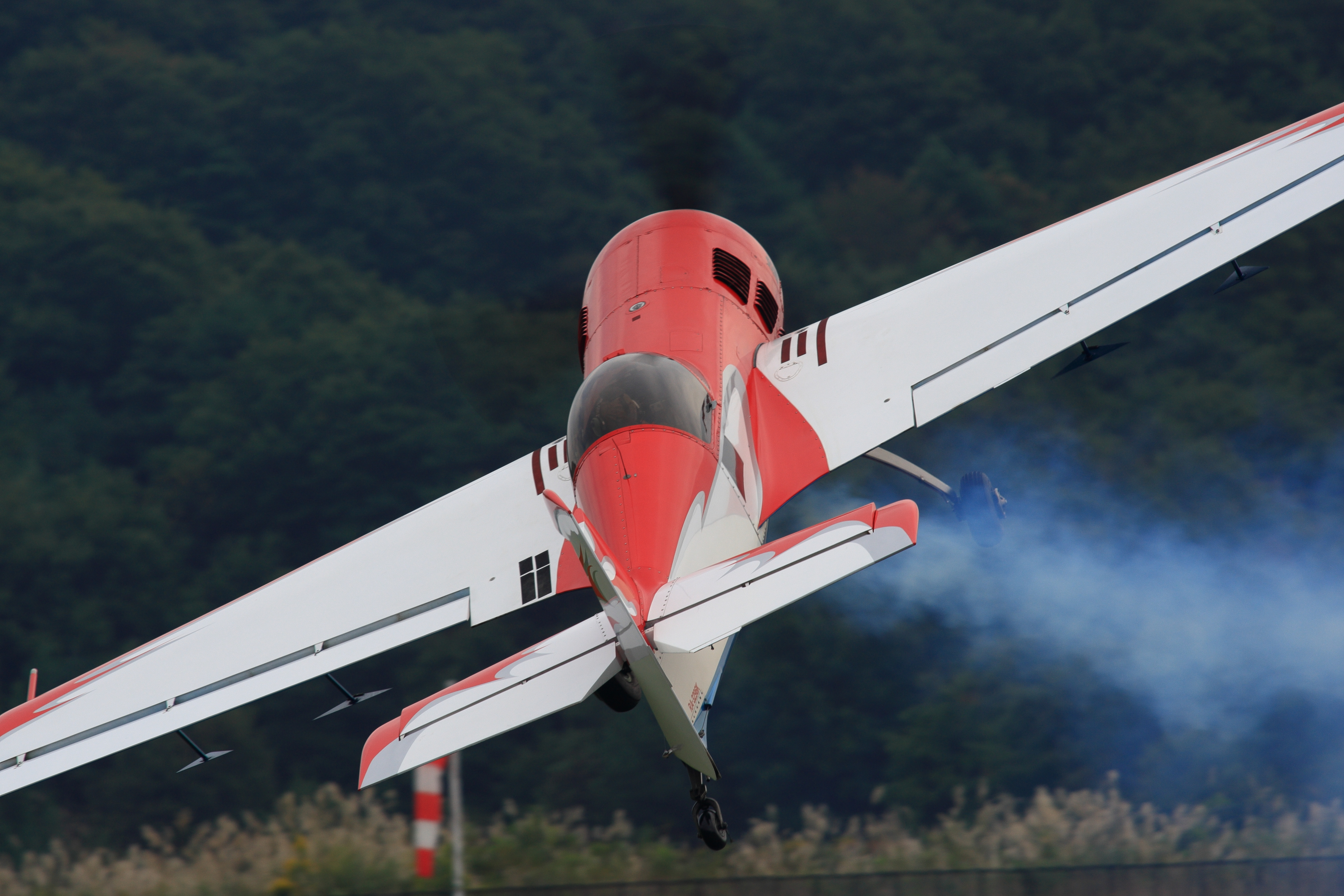
Sukhoi Su-26

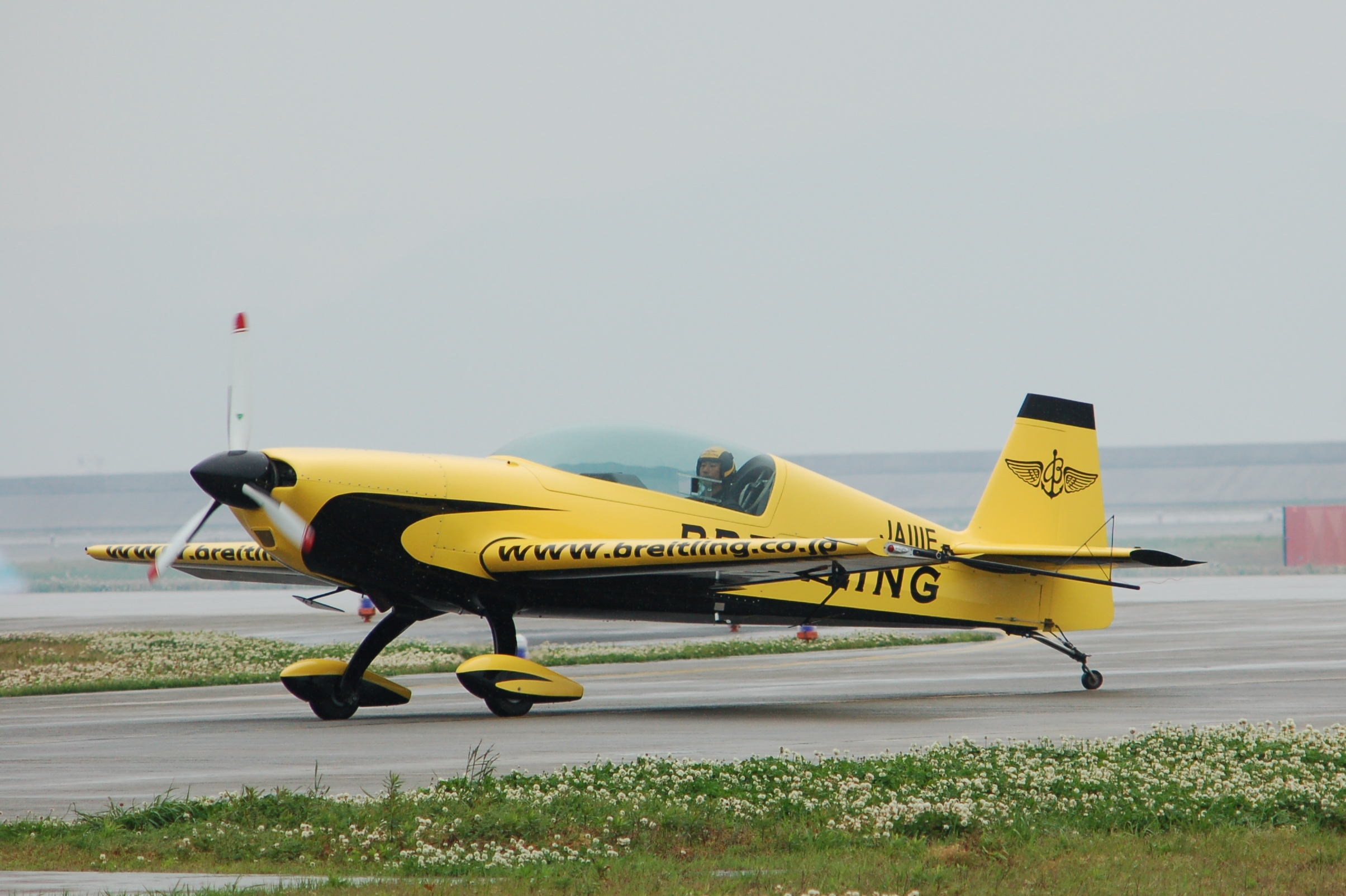
Extra 300L

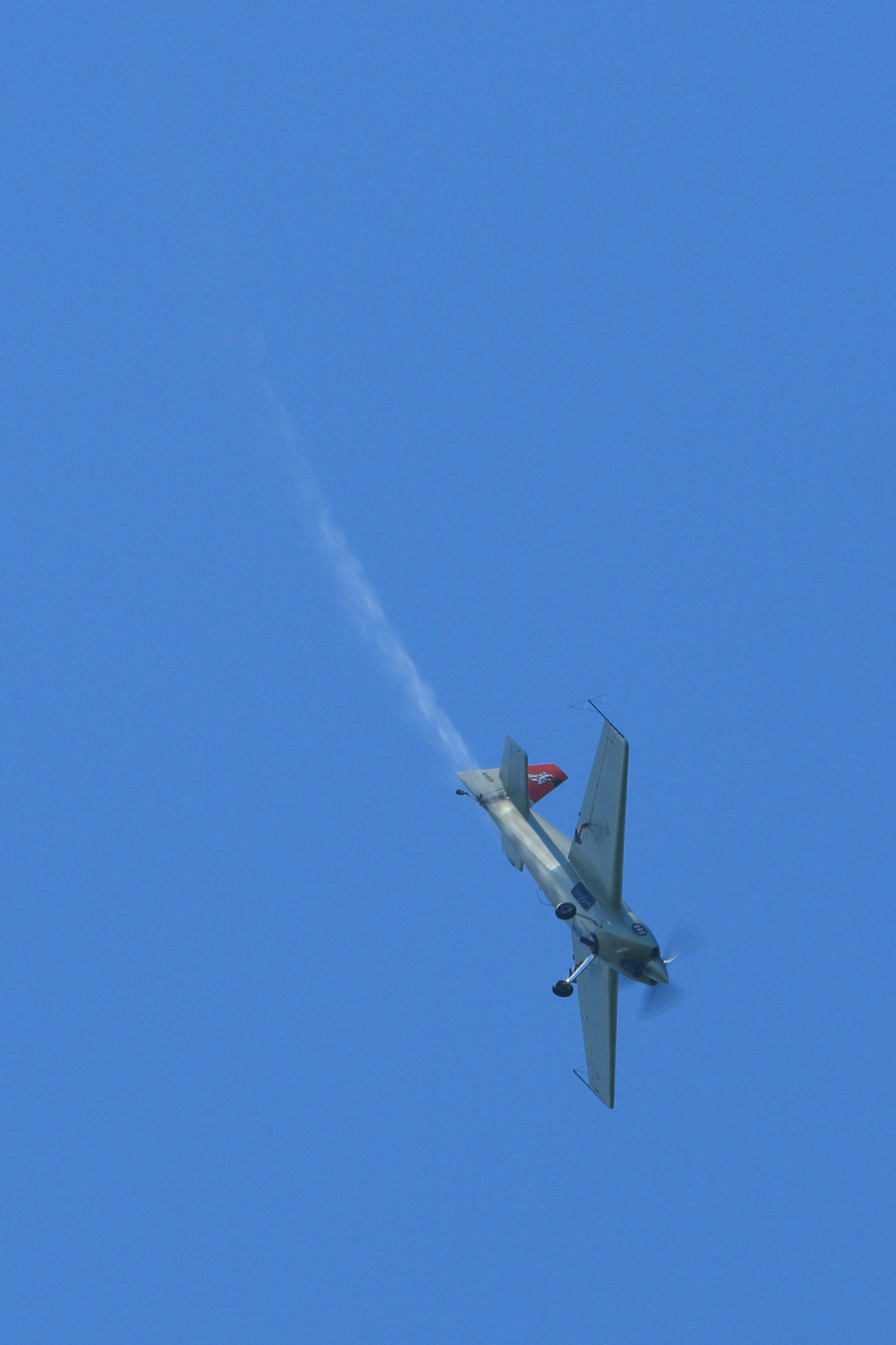
Zivko Edge 540 V2

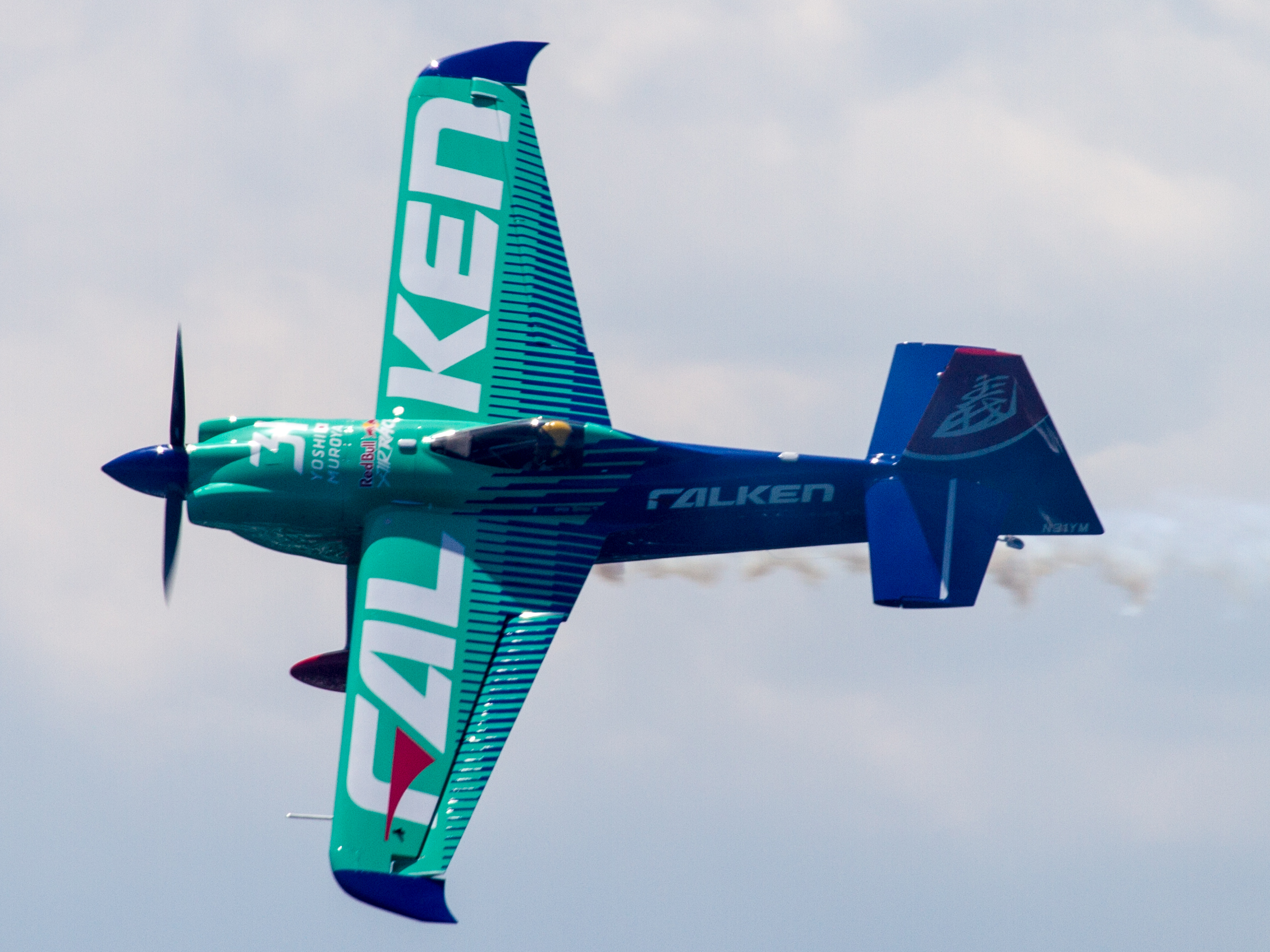
Zivko Edge 540 V3 of FALKEN color

== See also ==
- Competition aerobatics
