= 2019 Red Bull Air Race World Championship =

The 2019 Red Bull Air Race World Championship was the fourteenth and final Red Bull Air Race World Championship series. Red Bull has decided not to continue the Red Bull Air Race World Championship beyond the 2019 season.

== Aircraft and pilots ==
=== Master Class ===
No.	Pilot	Aircraft	Rounds
5	(Chile) Cristian Bolton	Zivko Edge 540 V2	All
11	(France) Mikaël Brageot	MX Aircraft MXS	All
10	(United States) Kirby Chambliss	Zivko Edge 540 V3	All
21	(Germany) Matthias Dolderer	Zivko Edge 540 V3	All
99	(United States) Michael Goulian	Zivko Edge 540 V2	All
95	(Australia) Matt Hall	Zivko Edge 540 V3	All
27	(France) Nicolas Ivanoff	Zivko Edge 540 V3	All
18	(Czech Republic) Petr Kopfstein	Zivko Edge 540 V3	All
12	(France) François Le Vot	Zivko Edge 540 V2	All
84	(Canada) Pete McLeod	Zivko Edge 540 V3	All
31	(Japan) Yoshihide Muroya	Zivko Edge 540 V3	All
24	(United Kingdom) Ben Murphy	Zivko Edge 540 V2	All
8	(Czech Republic) Martin Šonka	Zivko Edge 540 V3	All
26	(Spain) Juan Velarde	Zivko Edge 540 V2	All

=== Challenger Class ===
- All Challenger Cup Pilots used a Zivko Edge 540 V2.

No.	Pilot	Rounds
33	(France) Mélanie Astles	1, 3
62	(Germany) Florian Bergér	1–2, 4
7	(Hong Kong) Kenny Chiang	2, 4
48	(United States) Kevin Coleman	1–2, 4
32	(Italy) Dario Costa	1, 3
6	(Poland) Luke Czepiela	1, 3–4
77	(South Africa) Patrick Davidson	2–3
25	(United States) Sammy Mason	1, 3
17	(Sweden) Daniel Ryfa	2–3
23	(Austria) Patrick Strasser	2–3
15	(France) Baptiste Vignes	2–4
87	(Switzerland) Vito Wyprächtiger	3–4

Pilot changes

- USA's Sammy Mason, Austrian Patrick Strasser and Swiss Vito Wyprächtiger will make their debuts in the Challenger Class.

== Race calendar and results ==
On 23 January 2019, it was announced that Red Bull Air Race will be held in Chiba on September 7 and 8 at the Muroya's kickoff meeting held in Tokyo. The eight-event calendar for the 2019 season was announced on 29 January 2019.

Round	Country	Location	Date	Fastest Qualifying	Winning Pilot	Winning Aircraft	Winning Challenger
1	United Arab Emirates	Abu Dhabi	8–9 February	(Japan) Yoshihide Muroya	(Japan) Yoshihide Muroya	Zivko Edge 540 V3	R1: (Germany) Florian Bergér; R2: (Germany) Florian Bergér
2	Russia	Kazan, Tatarstan	15–16 June	(France) Mikaël Brageot	(Japan) Yoshihide Muroya	Zivko Edge 540 V3	R1: (Hong Kong) Kenny Chiang; R2: (Germany) Florian Bergér
3	Hungary	Zamárdi, Lake Balaton	13–14 July	(Czech Republic) Martin Šonka	(Australia) Matt Hall	Zivko Edge 540 V3	R1: (Italy) Dario Costa; R2: (Sweden) Daniel Ryfa
4	Japan	Makuhari, Chiba	7–8 September	(Spain) Juan Velarde	(Japan) Yoshihide Muroya	Zivko Edge 540 V3	R1: cancelled R2: cancelled

Races in Indianapolis, US, and Saudi Arabia which were to be held in October and November respectively were cancelled. Two more planned races, one in Europe and the other in Asia, did not have a venue at the time of the calendar reveal.

== Championship standings ==
=== Master Class ===
Master Class Qualifying scoring system

Position	**1st**	**2nd**	**3rd**
Points	3	2	1

Master Class scoring system

Position	**1st**	**2nd**	**3rd**	**4th**	**5th**	**6th**	**7th**	**8th**	**9th**	**10th**	**11th**	**12th**	**13th**	**14th**
Points	25	22	20	18	14	13	12	11	5	4	3	2	1	0

Pos.	Pilot	ABU (United Arab Emirates)	KAZ (Russia)	ZAM (Hungary)	CHI (Japan)	Points
1	(Australia) Matt Hall	5	2	1	3	81
2	(Japan) Yoshihide Muroya	**1** 1	1	12	1	80
3	(Czech Republic) Martin Šonka	2	3 2	**4** 1	13 2	68
4	(Canada) Pete McLeod	9 2	9	3	4	50
5	(United Kingdom) Ben Murphy	13	5	2	8	48
6	(United States) Kirby Chambliss	8	12	6	2	48
7	(France) Nicolas Ivanoff	4	7	11	5	47
8	(France) Mikaël Brageot	7	**8** 1	10 3	6	44
9	(United States) Michael Goulian	3 3	10	7	9	42
10	(Spain) Juan Velarde	6	11	5 2	**10** 1	39
11	(France) François Le Vot	12	4 3	14	7 3	34
12	(Chile) Cristian Bolton	14	6	8	11	27
13	(Czech Republic) Petr Kopfstein	10	13	9	14	10
14	(Germany) Matthias Dolderer	11	DNS	13	12	6
Pos.	Pilot	ABU (United Arab Emirates)	KAZ (Russia)	ZAM (Hungary)	CHI (Japan)	Points

Colour	Result
Gold	Winner
Silver	Second place
Bronze	Third place
Green	Points classification
Blue	Non-points classification
Blue	Non-classified finish (NC)
Purple	Retired, not classified (Ret)
Red	Did not qualify (DNQ)
Red	Did not pre-qualify (DNPQ)
Black	Disqualified (DSQ)
White	Did not start (DNS)
White	Withdrew (WD)
White	Race cancelled (C)
Blank	Did not practice (DNP)
Blank	Did not arrive (DNA)
Blank	Excluded (EX)

**Bold** – Fastest Qualifying Pilot

=== Challenger Class ===
Challenger Class scoring system

Position	**1st**	**2nd**	**3rd**	**4th**	**5th**	**6-8th**
Points	10	8	6	4	2	0

Pos.	Pilot	ABU (United Arab Emirates)	KAZ (Russia)	ZAM (Hungary)	CHI (Japan)	Drop	Points
1	(Germany) Florian Bergér	**1**	**1**				20
2	(France) Mélanie Astles	2		4			12
3	(United States) Kevin Coleman	3	4				10
4	(United States) Sammy Mason	4	8				12
5	(Italy) Dario Costa	5		1			12
6	(Poland) Luke Czepiela	6		5			2
-	(France) Baptiste Vignes	-	2	3			14
-	(Hong Kong) Kenny Chiang	-	1				10
-	(Sweden) Daniel Ryfa	-	6	1			10
-	(South Africa) Patrick Davidson	-	2	3			14
-	(Austria) Patrick Strasser	-	5	4			6
-	(Switzerland) Vito Wyprächtiger	-		6			0
Pos.	Pilot	ABU (United Arab Emirates)	KAZ (Russia)	BUD (Hungary)	CHI (Japan)	Drop	Points
