= Simon de la Bretèche =

French pilot (1982–2022)

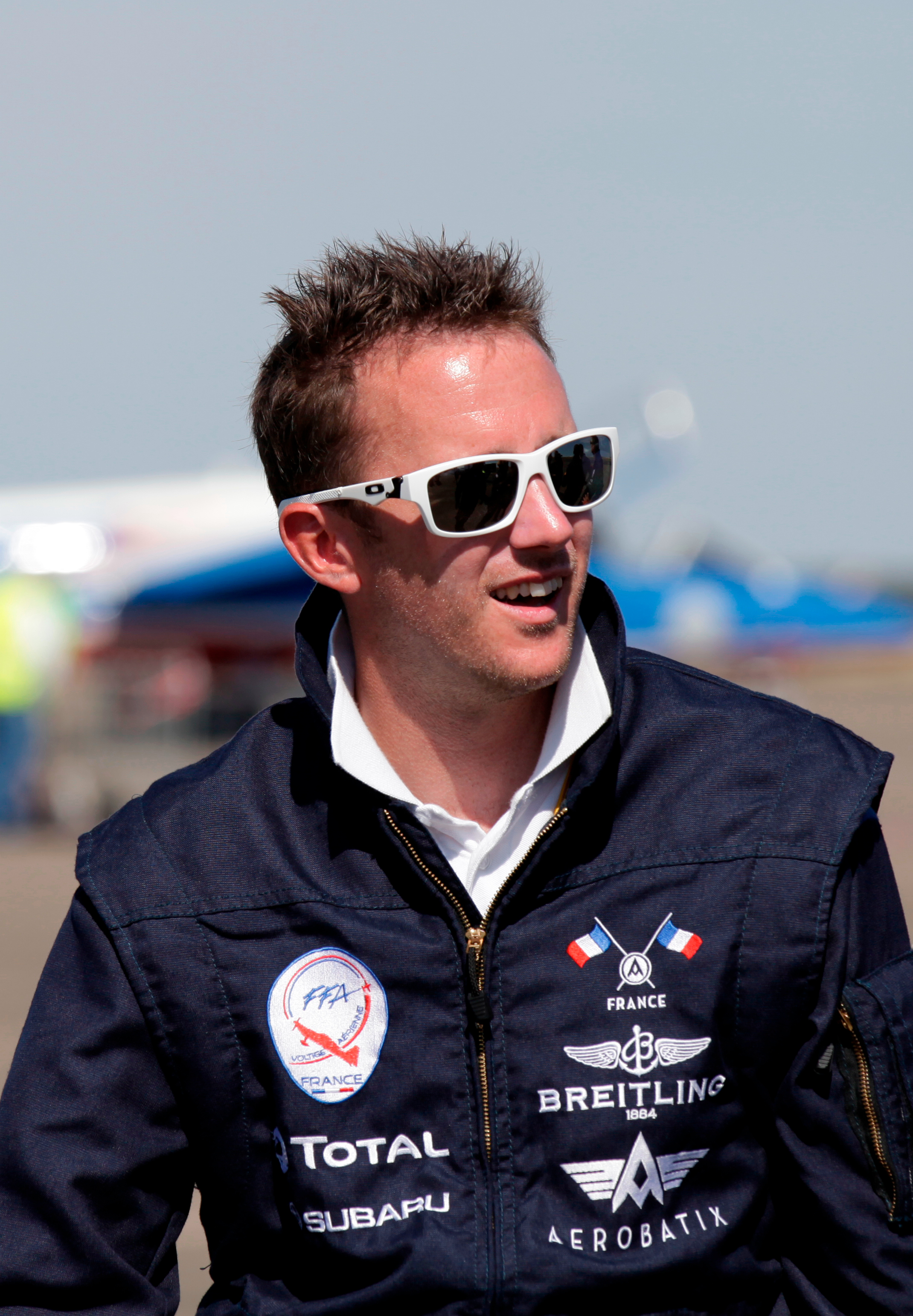
- Bretèche in 2015
- Born: 7 August 1982; Le Mans, Sarthe, France
- Died: 12 April 2022 (aged 39); Prat-Bonrepaux, Ariège (department), France
- Cause of death: Work accident, plane crash
- Resting place: Ancinnes

Simon de la Bretèche (7 August 1982 – 12 April 2022) was a pilot, aeronautical engineer and international aerobatic competitor.

== Biography ==
Simon spent his youth in Ancinnes, Sarthe. He made his debut in aeronautics at the age of 14 at the Aéroclub d'Alençon to which he will always remain attached. Then, he trained in aerobatics at the regional aeroclub of Caen with his instructor/mentor: Patrick Gigot. In 2005, he obtained a Master of Science degree in aeronautics from the Institut polytechnique des sciences avancées. He then worked in Toulouse for Sogeclair Aerospace, an Airbus subcontractor.

In May 2020, he was hired by the company Aura Aero as an engineer to work on an aerobatic plane called Integral R. He died with his colleague and friend Baptiste Vignes following the crash of a prototype of this plane at during a test flight. The BEA-É released an investigation report. A judicial investigation by the Ariège gendarmerie group and the air transport gendarmerie. is still underway.

== Achievements ==
=== With the french national team ===
Year	Title	Championship
2009	1st	Europe
2010	1st	World
2011	1st	Europe
2012	1st	World
2013	1st	Europe

=== Individual ===
Year	Title	Championship	Category
2007	2nd	France	Advanced
2008	1st	France	Advanced
2009	2nd	France	Advanced
2009	4th	Europe	Advanced
2010	4th	Europe	Advanced
2010	2nd	France	Advanced
2011	3rd	Europe	Advanced
2011	4th	France	Excellence
2012	1st	France	Excellence
2012	2nd	World	Advanced
2013	2nd	France	Excellence
2013	1st	Europe	Advanced
2014	3rd	France	Unlimited
