= 2018 Red Bull Air Race World Championship =

Location

The 2018 Red Bull Air Race World Championship was the thirteenth Red Bull Air Race World Championship series.

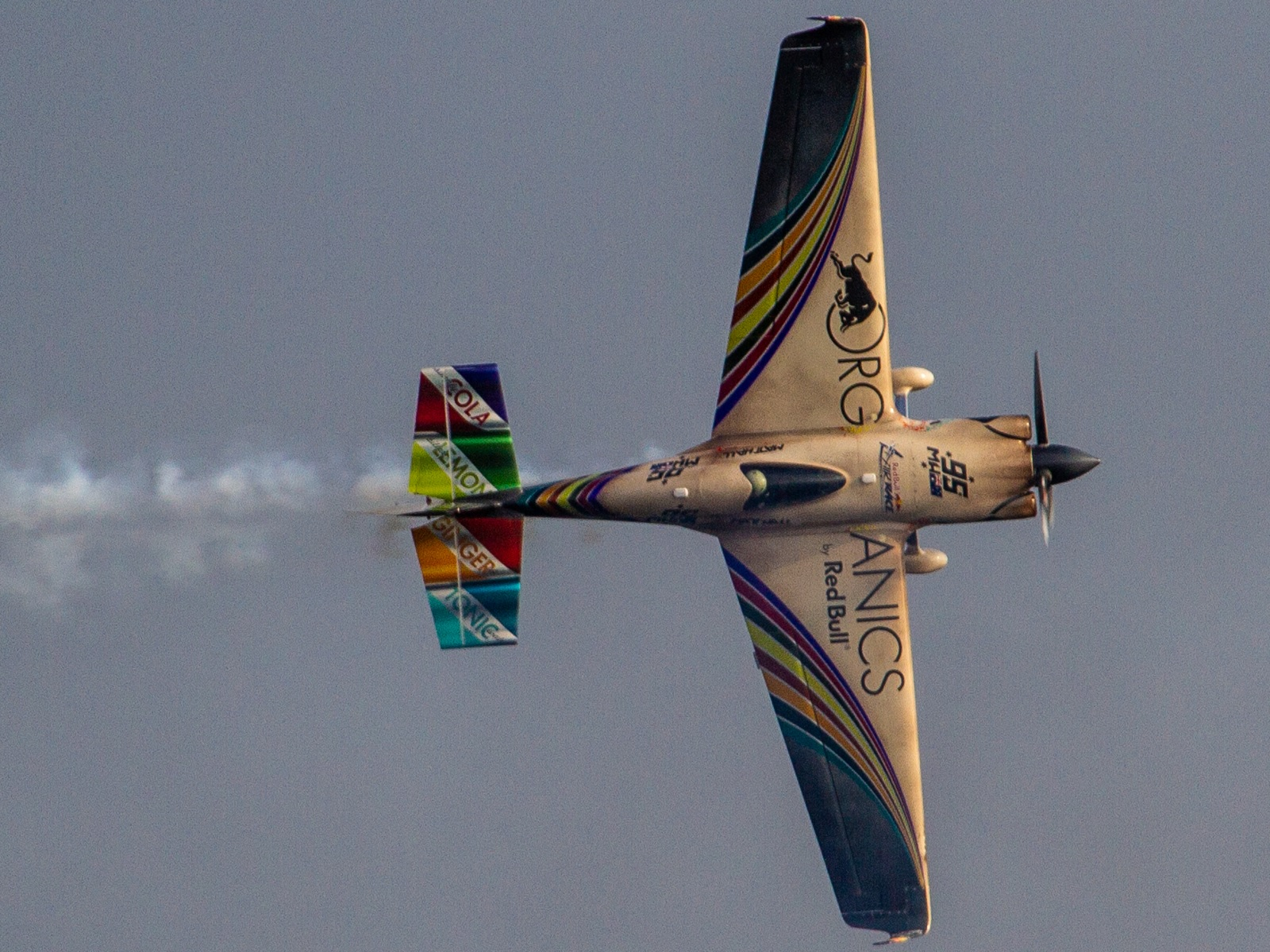
Matt Hall at the 2018 Red Bull Air Race of Chiba.

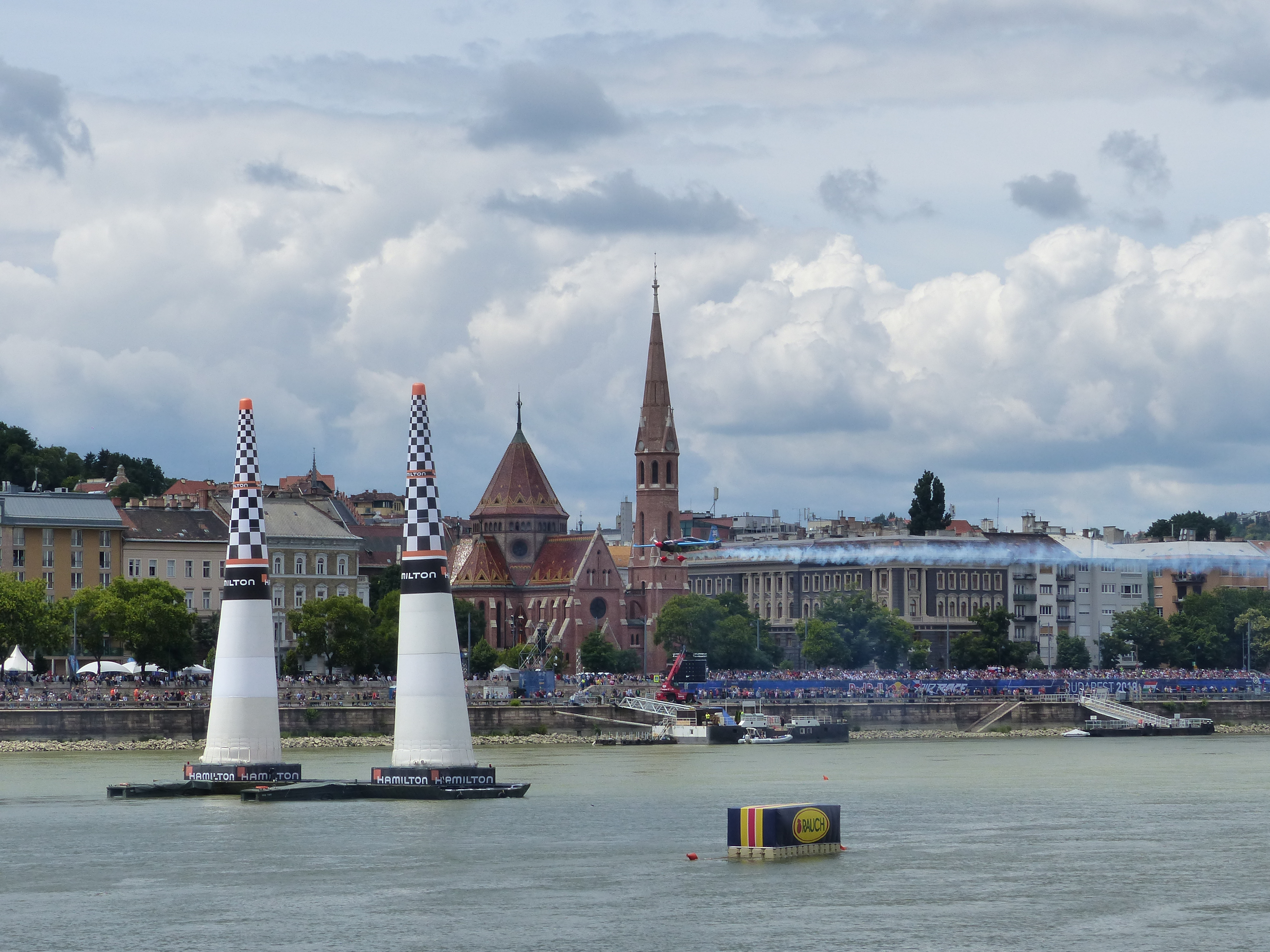
2018 Red Bull Air Race of Budapest.

== Aircraft and pilots ==
=== Master Class ===
| No. | Pilot | Aircraft | Rounds |
|---|---|---|---|
| 5 | (Chile) Cristian Bolton | Zivko Edge 540 V2 | All |
| 11 | (France) Mikaël Brageot | MX Aircraft MXS | All |
| 10 | (United States) Kirby Chambliss | Zivko Edge 540 V3 | All |
| 21 | (Germany) Matthias Dolderer | Zivko Edge 540 V3 | All |
| 99 | (United States) Michael Goulian | Zivko Edge 540 V2 | All |
| 95 | (Australia) Matt Hall | Zivko Edge 540 V3 | All |
| 27 | (France) Nicolas Ivanoff | Zivko Edge 540 V3 | All |
| 18 | (Czech Republic) Petr Kopfstein | Zivko Edge 540 V3 | All |
| 12 | (France) François Le Vot | Zivko Edge 540 V2 | All |
| 84 | (Canada) Pete McLeod | Zivko Edge 540 V3 | All |
| 31 | (Japan) Yoshihide Muroya | Zivko Edge 540 V3 | All |
| 24 | (United Kingdom) Ben Murphy | Zivko Edge 540 V2 | All |
| 8 | (Czech Republic) Martin Šonka | Zivko Edge 540 V3 | All |
| 26 | (Spain) Juan Velarde | Zivko Edge 540 V2 | All |

Pilot changes

- Peter Podlunšek retired the master class pilot of Red Bull Air Race following the final round of the 2017 season.
- 2017 Challenger Class pilot of Red Bull Air Race Ben Murphy made his debut in the Master Class.

=== Challenger Class ===
- All Challenger Cup Pilots used a Zivko Edge 540 V2.

| No. | Pilot | Rounds |
|---|---|---|
| 33 | (France) Mélanie Astles | 2–4, 6 |
| 62 | (Germany) Florian Bergér | 1, 3, 7–8 |
| 7 | (Hong Kong) Kenny Chiang | 3–8 |
| 48 | (United States) Kevin Coleman | 1, 4–5, 7–8 |
| 32 | (Italy) Dario Costa | 1–2, 4, 6–7 |
| 6 | (Poland) Luke Czepiela | 1, 3–4, 6, 8 |
| 77 | (South Africa) Patrick Davidson | 1–2, 4–5, 7 |
| 78 | (Hungary) Daniel Genevey | 1–3, 5, 7 |
| 17 | (Sweden) Daniel Ryfa | 1–2, 5–6, 8 |
| 15 | (France) Baptiste Vignes | 2–3, 5–8 |

Pilot changes

- Italy's Dario Costa and South Africa's Patrick Davidson will make their debuts in the Challenger Class.

== Race calendar and results ==
The eight-event calendar for the 2018 season was announced on 8 November 2017. Chiba of rounds 3 were announced on 6 March 2018. On 24 July 2018, the season finale was announced to be held at the Texas Motor Speedway in Fort Worth, Texas.

| Round | Country | Location | Date | Fastest Qualifying | Winning Pilot | Winning Aircraft | Winning Challenger |
|---|---|---|---|---|---|---|---|
| 1 | United Arab Emirates | Abu Dhabi | 2–3 February | (Germany) Matthias Dolderer | (United States) Michael Goulian | Zivko Edge 540 V2 | (Germany) Florian Bergér |
| 2 | France | Cannes, Provence-Alpes-Côte d'Azur | 21–22 April | (United States) Michael Goulian | (Australia) Matt Hall | Zivko Edge 540 V3 | (Sweden) Daniel Ryfa |
| 3 | Japan | Makuhari, Chiba | 26–27 May | (United States) Michael Goulian | (Australia) Matt Hall | Zivko Edge 540 V3 | Not held |
| 4 | Hungary | Budapest, Central Hungary | 23–24 June | (Czech Republic) Martin Šonka | (Czech Republic) Martin Šonka | Zivko Edge 540 V3 | (Poland) Luke Czepiela |
| 5 | Russia | Kazan, Tatarstan | 25–26 August | (Germany) Matthias Dolderer | (Czech Republic) Martin Šonka | Zivko Edge 540 V3 | (United States) Kevin Coleman |
| 6 | Austria | Wiener Neustadt, Austria | 15–16 September | (Japan) Yoshihide Muroya | (Czech Republic) Martin Šonka | Zivko Edge 540 V3 | R1: (Hong Kong) Kenny Chiang; R2: (Hong Kong) Kenny Chiang |
| 7 | United States | Indianapolis Motor Speedway, Indiana | 6–7 October | (Czech Republic) Martin Šonka | (United States) Michael Goulian | Zivko Edge 540 V2 | (Germany) Florian Bergér |
| 8 | United States | Texas Motor Speedway, Fort Worth | 17–18 November | (Germany) Matthias Dolderer | (Czech Republic) Martin Šonka | Zivko Edge 540 V3 | (Poland) Luke Czepiela |

== Championship standings ==
=== Master Class ===
Master Class scoring system

| Position | **1st** | **2nd** | **3rd** | **4th** | **5th** | **6th** | **7th** | **8th** | **9th** | **10th** | **11–14th** |
| Points | 15 | 12 | 9 | 7 | 6 | 5 | 4 | 3 | 2 | 1 | 0 |

| Pos. | Pilot | ABU (United Arab Emirates) | CAN (France) | CHI (Japan) | BUD (Hungary) | KAZ (Russia) | WIN (Austria) | IND (United States) | FTW (United States) | Points |
|---|---|---|---|---|---|---|---|---|---|---|
| 1 | (Czech Republic) Martin Šonka | 4 | 8 | 3 | **1** | 1 | 1 | **10** | 1 | 80 |
| 2 | (Australia) Matt Hall | 5 | 1 | 1 | 3 | 7 | 3 | 6 | 2 | 75 |
| 3 | (United States) Michael Goulian | 1 | **3** | **2** | 4 | 2 | 12 | 1 | 8 | 73 |
| 4 | (France) Mikaël Brageot | 8 | 5 | 5 | 2 | 12 | 4 | 9 | 6 | 41 |
| 5 | (Japan) Yoshihide Muroya | 2 | 4 | 14 | 11 | 8 | **2** | 12 | 5 | 40 |
| 6 | (United States) Kirby Chambliss | 3 | 12 | 13 | 10 | 3 | 8 | 8 | 3 | 34 |
| 7 | (United Kingdom) Ben Murphy | 6 | 10 | 11 | 8 | 5 | 13 | 4 | 4 | 29 |
| 8 | (Canada) Pete McLeod | 14 | 7 | 4 | 12 | 11 | 7 | 2 | 11 | 27 |
| 9 | (Spain) Juan Velarde | 11 | 6 | 7 | 13 | 4 | 11 | 7 | 7 | 24 |
| 10 | (France) Nicolas Ivanoff | 10 | 14 | 12 | 7 | 10 | 6 | 3 | 9 | 22 |
| 11 | (France) François Le Vot | 7 | 11 | 6 | 5 | 6 | 10 | 14 | 10 | 22 |
| 12 | (Germany) Matthias Dolderer | **13** | 2 | 8 | DNS | **13** | 9 | 11 | **13** | 17 |
| 13 | (Czech Republic) Petr Kopfstein | 9 | 9 | 9 | 9 | 9 | 5 | 13 | 12 | 16 |
| 14 | (Chile) Cristian Bolton | 12 | 13 | 10 | 6 | 14 | 14 | 5 | 14 | 12 |
| Pos. | Pilot | ABU (United Arab Emirates) | CAN (France) | CHI (Japan) | BUD (Hungary) | KAZ (Russia) | WIN (Austria) | IND (United States) | FTW (United States) | Points |

| Colour | Result |
|---|---|
| Gold | Winner |
| Silver | Second place |
| Bronze | Third place |
| Green | Points classification |
| Blue | Non-points classification |
| Blue | Non-classified finish (NC) |
| Purple | Retired, not classified (Ret) |
| Red | Did not qualify (DNQ) |
| Red | Did not pre-qualify (DNPQ) |
| Black | Disqualified (DSQ) |
| White | Did not start (DNS) |
| White | Withdrew (WD) |
| White | Race cancelled (C) |
| Blank | Did not practice (DNP) |
| Blank | Did not arrive (DNA) |
| Blank | Excluded (EX) |

**Bold** – Fastest Qualifying Pilot

=== Challenger Class ===
Challenger Class scoring system

| Position | **1st** | **2nd** | **3rd** | **4th** | **5th** | **6-8th** |
| Points | 10 | 8 | 6 | 4 | 2 | 0 |

| Pos. | Pilot | ABU (United Arab Emirates) | CAN (France) | BUD (Hungary) | KAZ (Russia) | WIN (Austria) | IND (United States) | FTW (United States) | Drop | Points |
|---|---|---|---|---|---|---|---|---|---|---|
| 1 | (Poland) Luke Czepiela | 2 | | 1 | 6 | 2 | | 1 | | 36 |
| 2 | (Germany) Florian Bergér | 1 | | 2 | | | 1 | 2 | | 36 |
| 3 | (United States) Kevin Coleman | 3 | | | 1 | 9 | 2 | 3 | | 30 |
| 4 | (France) Baptiste Vignes | | 2 | 5 | | 3 | 4 | 4 | 2 | 24 |
| 5 | (South Africa) Patrick Davidson | 6 | 5 | | 2 | 4 | 3 | | | 20 |
| 6 | (Hong Kong) Kenny Chiang | | | 6 | 3 | 1 | 7 | 6 | | 16 |
| 7 | (Sweden) Daniel Ryfa | 5 | 1 | | | 8 | | 5 | | 14 |
| 8 | (Italy) Dario Costa | 4 | 3 | | 5 | 7 | 5 | | | 14 |
| 9 | (France) Mélanie Astles | | 4 | 4 | 4 | 5 | | | | 14 |
| 10 | (Hungary) Daniel Genevey | 7 | 6 | 3 | | 6 | 6 | | | 6 |
| Pos. | Pilot | ABU (United Arab Emirates) | CAN (France) | BUD (Hungary) | KAZ (Russia) | WIN (Austria) | IND (United States) | FTW (United States) | Drop | Points |
