= Baptiste Vignes =

French pilot (1985–2022)

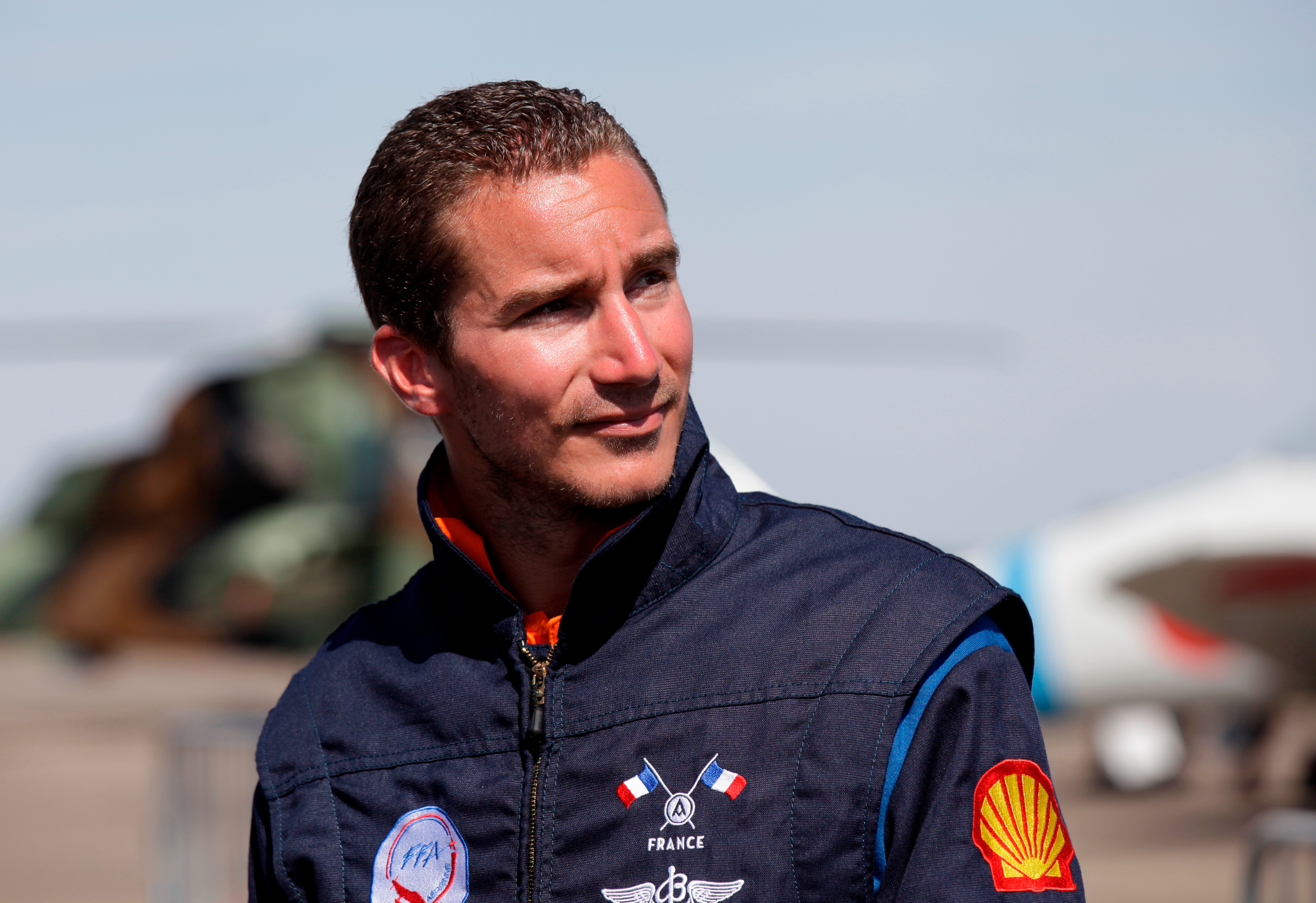
- Vignes in 2015
- Born: 15 April 1985; Calais, Pas-de-Calais, France
- Died: 12 April 2022 (aged 36); Prat-Bonrepaux, Ariège (department), France
- Cause of death: Work accident, plane crash

Baptiste Vignes (15 April 1985 – 12 April 2022) was a French pilot, instructor, and international aerobatics champion.

== Biography ==
Vignes grew up in Le Havre and obtained his pilot's license at the Le Havre's Jean-Maridor flying club at a young age. He then trained as an aerobatic pilot at the Bernay-Saint-Martin flying club in the Eure department. He died with Simon de la Bretèche following the crash of Aura Aero's Integral R aerobatic aircraft prototype during a flight test. An investigation by the French State Aviation Safety Accident Investigation Board was started, as well as a judicial investigation by the Ariège Gendarmerie and the Gendarmerie of air transport.

== Career ==
In 2012, Vignes worked an instructor and aerobatic coach in Dijon. One year later, he became chief pilot at Top Gun Voltige, a recreational flying company. In 2017 he was recruited by Red Bull to participate in the Red Bull Air Race World Championship as a contestant for the 2017 season. In 2018 he became an instructor at the Bernay-Saint-Martin flying club. In 2019, he joined the flight test team at Aura Aero, a French aerospace manufacturer.

== Achievements ==
=== With the french national team ===
Year	Title	Championship
2009	1st	Europe
2010	1st	World
2011	1st	Europe
2015	1st	World
2016	1st	Europe
2017	1st	World

=== Individual ===
Year	Title	Championship	Category
2008	2nd	France	Advanced
2009	1st	France	Advanced
2010	1st	France	Advanced
2010	1st	World	Advanced
2011	2nd	Europe	Advanced
2011	3rd	France	Excellence
2012	2nd	France	Elite
2015	3rd	France	Final Freestyle
