= Dario Costa =

Italian air race, aerobatic, stuntman and flight instructor pilot

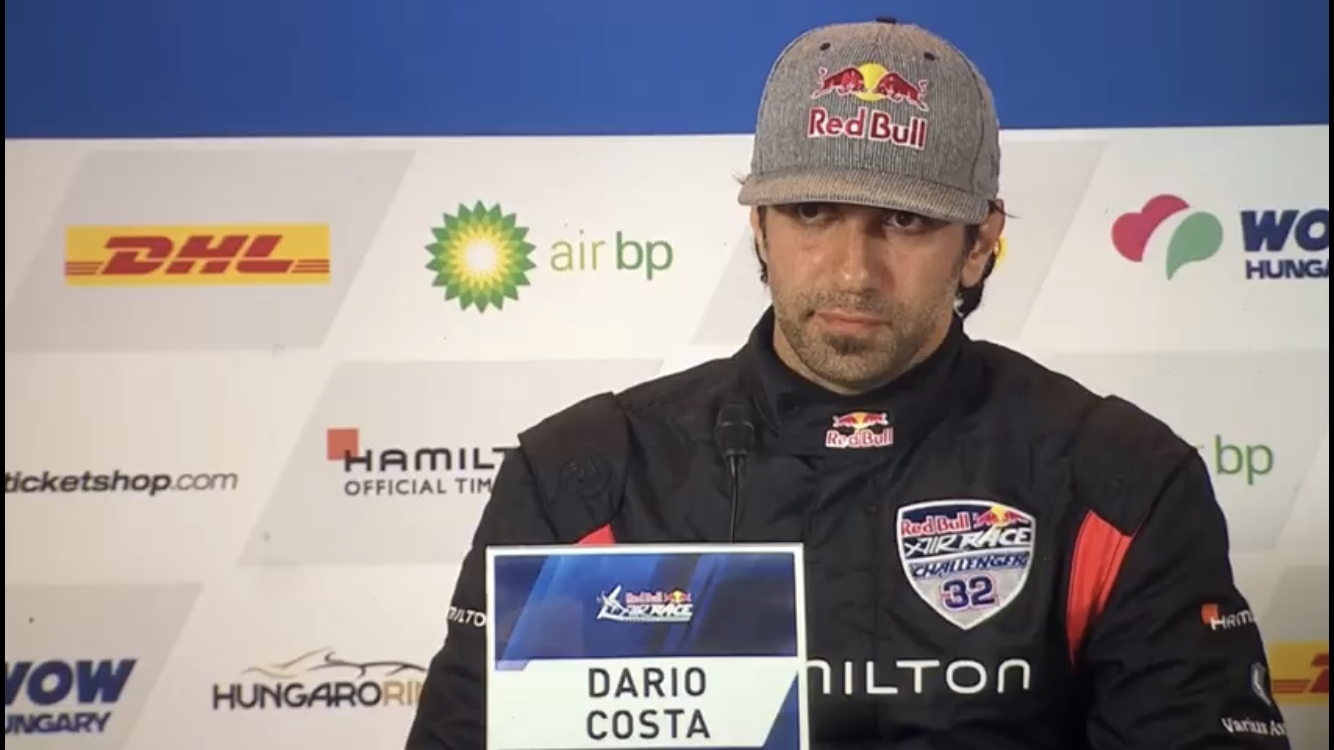
- Dario Costa press conference Challenger Cup Lake Balaton 2019
- Born: Dario Costa; 9 May 1980 (age 46); Manchester, United Kingdom
- Aviation career

Racing career
- First race: 2018
- Best position: 1st (2019)
- Aircraft: Zivko Edge 540 V2
- Website: dariocosta.com

Dario Costa (born 9 May 1980, Manchester, United Kingdom) born to an Iranian mother and an Italian father, is an Italian professional Red Bull Air Race competitor, stunt pilot, aerobatic performer, flight instructor, Pilatus PC6 Porter paradropping pilot and author from Bologna, Italy and is the first ever Italian to qualify, to compete and to win in the Red Bull Air Race World Series. Dario lives in Salzburg, Austria and is also known for various world-first flying stunts and world records including the first and only flight through a tunnel in an airplane, as well as becoming the first person to land on and take off from a 120 km/h moving train.

== Biography ==
Dario Costa spent his early childhood traveling across North Africa building up his passion for flying, then, at the age of six, moved to Bologna, where he started to learn piloting while at high school where after formal flight training he did his first solo flight at the age of 16 in 1996. Earned his living initially as gardener, swimming pool cleaner, postman and later on as theoretical instructor at his flying club and former high school enabling him few years later, after winning Aeroclub Bologna's first ever scholarship, to obtain his commercial pilot, flight instructor and aerobatic flight-instructor qualifications.

Teaching and competing in aerobatics, Dario evolved with the sport and in 2011, while still teaching full-time, was contest director of the 2011 FAI World Aerobatic Championships and became Chief Flight and Ground Instructor at the Aeroclub Milano.

In October 2013, Costa joined the Red Bull Air Race World Championship as flight operations manager, development and ferry pilot.

In 2016, Costa became the first Italian to ever qualify as Red Bull Air Race World Championship race pilot.

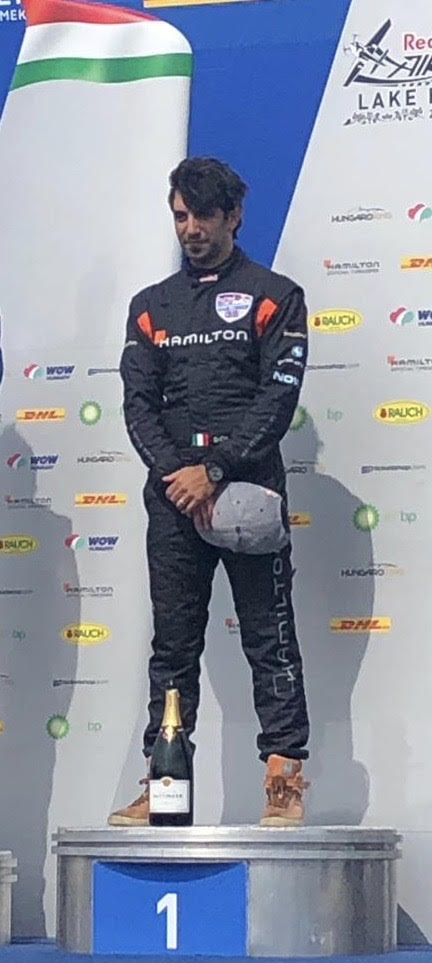
Dario Costa winning the Red Bull Air Race Challenger Cup in Lake Balaton, 2019

In 2017, Costa became the first airplane pilot to ever fly in synchro with freestyle skier. The skier was the Italian Ian Rocca, the location was the Mottolino Livigno snowpark and the stunt was part of a Lamborghini ad.

In 2018, Costa started competing in the Red Bull Air Race Challenger Cup becoming the first Italian to join this motorsport competition. On his second race got on the podium and on his second season won the 2019 Challenger Cup in Lake Balaton.

In July 2018, Costa became the first civilian airplane pilot to ever fly and be featured in an air to air photo-shooting over the city of Venice, in Italy. and also became the first pilot, together with Ben Murphy, to ever perform a Red Bull Air Race demo at the Farnborough International Airshow, the world's second-largest show of its kind.

In March 2019, Costa became the first airplane pilot to ever fly low level racing manoeuvres over the Namib Desert, in this occasion for a Hamilton Watch ad.

In 2019, Costa became the first airplane pilot to ever perform and include in his display routine a barrel roll in formation flight together with a helicopter flown by another Italian pilot Mirko Flaim and also became the second pilot to ever include in his display routine multiple consecutive barrel rolls around wingsuit skydivers, in his case the Austrian Red Bull Skydive Team.

In September 2019, Costa has performed at the Airpower, the biggest airshow in Europe.

In June 2020, Costa has performed in the Red Bull movie "Drum the Bull", a music video in which the internationally renowned percussionist Martin Grubinger combines classical music with the sounds of different motorsports, including the modified Zivko Edge 540 flown by Costa, to celebrate the 2020 Formula One World Championship back to back opening races in Spielberg.

In July 2020, Costa became the first airplane pilot to ever fly at low level, in this occasion for the F1 Styrian GP, along the whole Red Bull Ring racetrack for a kind of track preview video.

In 2020, Costa has performed as opening act of the F1 Styrian GP, MotoGP Austrian and Styrian GP's and of the World Rally Championship in Turkey, becoming the first airplane pilot to ever perform as side-act at a F1 and a MotoGP and a World Rally Championship race in the same year.

In October 2020, Costa has performed in two of the break dance competition Red Bull BC One World Finals announcement videos, flying in synchro with dancer Rico Coker.

On 2 January 2021, Costa unveiled a live biometric system installed in his stunt-plane since 2020. A tailor made system based on an original idea from Costa himself and Marcel Stenner which software was then programmed by Red Bull Innovation Team.

On 20 January 2021 Costa unveiled a tailor made seat based on the current F1 and World Rally Championship seats adapted by Red Bull Athlete Performance Center physiotherapist David Denifl together with Austrian motorcycle road racer August Auinger and race car driver Bernhard Auinger.

On 21 April 2021 was announced that Costa will be racing in the top category of the World Championship Air Race planned to start in early 2022. This championship replaces the Red Bull Air Race and its new top category, replacing the Red Bull Air Race Master Class, is called AeroGP1.

On 4 September 2021 Costa flew through T1 and T2 tunnels on the Northern Marmara Motorway in Istanbul becoming the first ever pilot to fly through a tunnel and setting the Guinness World Record of longest tunnel flown by an airplane.

In May 2022 for his second time, Costa has performed in a Lamborghini ad video campaign, this time for the Huracan Tecnica model launch.

On 20 June 2022 a scientific article about the Tunnel Pass project was published by Costa and written together with Mikel Lucas Garcia de Albeniz Martinez, Barbara Forster, Peter Adrian Leitl and Andreas Flaschger.

In summer 2022 an online videogame called "Red Bull Giro Veloce" was made in which players could choose to use either Costa or F1 driver Max Verstappen to respectively fly or drive in the Red Bull Ring racetrack to win a flight with Dario or a day with Max.

On 26 August 2022 Costa gave a Ted Talk at the TedX Cortina.

In September 2022 in Polignano a Mare, Italy, Costa became the first airplane pilot to ever fly in synchro with a diver positioning himself in a climbing vertical path beside the descending diver jumping from 27 meters height. Four professional high divers have performed in this project: Alessandro De Rose, Catalin Preda, Artem Silchenko, Aidan Heslop, coordinated by Orlando Duque. From this performance various videos and pictures in honor of Domenico Modugno were produced.

On 2 and 3 September 2022 Costa, together with Mirko Flaim, the Red Bull Skydive Team and The Flying Bulls, have performed at the Airpower 22 international airshow in Zeltweg, Austria, a new version of the Red Bull Aerobatic Triple for the very first time in public.

On 3 November 2022 the book "il Tunnel Perfetto" written in Italian language by Dario Costa and co-writer Biagio D'Angelo was published by Edizioni Minerva. Its English version was announced to be published in early 2023.

After almost a year of work with his partner Prada, in early 2023, the world's first specifically made race and aerobatic flight suit, shoes and gloves were unveiled with two dedicated movies.

In May 2023, Costa and Swift Fuel GmbH, announced their cooperation to use and develop renewable fuels for high performance aviation engines.

In September 2023, Dario becomes the first ever to fly a slalom in between moving boats, in this case the two AC40 from Luna Rossa Prada Pirelli and Alinghi Red Bull Racing teams competing at the America's Cup foiling in Vilanova i la Geltrù (Spain) at about 50 km/h.

In 2024, Costa becomes the first Italian and youngest ever to win the Living Legends of Aviation "Bob Hoover - Freedom of Flight" award.

In January 2025, Costa sets his 17th aviation world first in his 15th world first project becoming the very first to fly with an airplane down a ski slope from start to finish gate. The ski slope was the Streif, a World Cup downhill ski course in Austria, located on Hahnenkamm mountain (Kitzbühel Alps) in Kitzbühel, which has hosted the Hahnenkamm Races since 1937. The Streif is the steepest and considered to be the hardest of all ski courses of the Ski World Cup.

On 15 February, in Afyon (Turkey), Costa became the world first to land on and take-off again from a specific area marked on top of container positioned on the 10th wagon of a 120 km/h moving train, using the same aircraft he used for all his world first actions, the Zivko Edge N544AR, an experimental mid-wing airplane that did not allow him to see any part of the train from a distance of 200 meters till the moment he was again airborne, on his climb out after take-off making this a blind landing and take-off.

On 15 April, in Maribor (Slovenia), Dario Costa and Mirko Flaim performed the world first airplane-helicopter formation loop.

== Other activities and curiosities ==
For almost ten years Costa has been a player of the Fortitudo Baseball Bologna competing in the U12, U15 (Cadetti) and U18 (Juniores) Italian Regional and National Baseball Championships till 1996. He has been mainly playing as second baseman and pitcher, but was selected once as relief pitcher for the Italian National Under 18 Team. His baseball uniform number was mainly the 32, which is the number he uses as a race pilot.

In October and November 2020 Dario was spotted in Rome performing as stuntman for the movie Mission: Impossible – Dead Reckoning Part One.

== Awards and accolades ==
- In 2024, Costa was awarded with the Living Legends of Aviation "Bob Hoover - Freedom of Flight" award.
- In 2022, Costa and the "Tunnel Pass" project were awarded with the following ten awards: 2× Bronze Clio awards, 1× Gold and 1× Bronze New York Festivals awards, 2× Gold and 1× Bronze Golden Drum awards, 1× Gold and 1× Bronze Effie awards, 1× Bronze Art Directors Club of Europe award.
- In 2021, Costa was awarded with the Guinness World Record of the first and longest ever tunnel flown by an airplane.
- In 2015, Costa was awarded by the Comitato Olimpico Nazionale Italiano with the "Medaglia al valore atletico" (Medal for athletic prowess).
- On 5 August 2018, Costa was featured in a picture over Venice which was included in "The best images in sport" by The Sunday Times.
- On 8 November 2019, Costa was awarded by the Italian Region Emilia Romagna for his sport achievements

== Filmography ==
Date	Title	Location	Notes
April 2017	Lamborghini – Aventador S: Dare your EGO at high Altitude	Livigno, Italy	Directed by Alessandro Zorio
November 2017	Briko – The Golden Helmet: Episode 3	Salzburg, Austria	featuring Lindsey Vonn
September 2019	Hamilton Watch – Dreams of Flight	Namib Desert, Namibia	Directed by Jacob Sutton
July 2020	Red Bull – Drum the Bull	Red Bull Ring, Austria	Directed by Fritz Melchert
July 2020	Red Bull – 2020 Styrian Grand Prix | Formula 1 Track Preview	Red Bull Ring, Austria	Directed by Christoph Deja
October 2020	Red Bull BC One | 2020 World Finals	Salzburg, Austria	Produced by Red Bull Media House
May 2022	Lamborghini – Huracan Tecnica: Fun to drive con Dario Costa	Salzburg, Austria	Directed by Alessandro Zorio
August 2022	Red Bull – Aerobatic Triple 2.0	Zeltweg, Austria	Directed by Christoph Deja
September 2022	Red Bull – VOLARE	Polignano a Mare, Italy	Produced by Red Bull Media House
February 2023	Prada – Prada for Dario Costa	Salzburg, Austria	
January 2025	Red Bull – Streif course preview	Kitzbühel, Austria	

== Results ==
=== Italian National Powered Aerobatic Championship ===
Season	Category	Location	Ranking
2015	Unlimited	Lucca, Italy	1st
2010	Sportsman	Ravenna, Italy	2nd

=== Red Bull Air Race ===
==== Challenger Class ====
Year	1	2	3	4	5	Podiums	Wins
2018	(United Arab Emirates); 4th	(France); 3rd	(Russia); 5th	(Austria); 5th	(United States); 5th	1	0
2019	(United Arab Emirates); 5th	(Hungary); 1st	(Hungary); 2nd	CAN	CAN	2	1

Legend: * CAN: Cancelled * DNP: Did not participate * DNS: Did not start * DSQ: Disqualified
