= Ancinnes =

- Commune
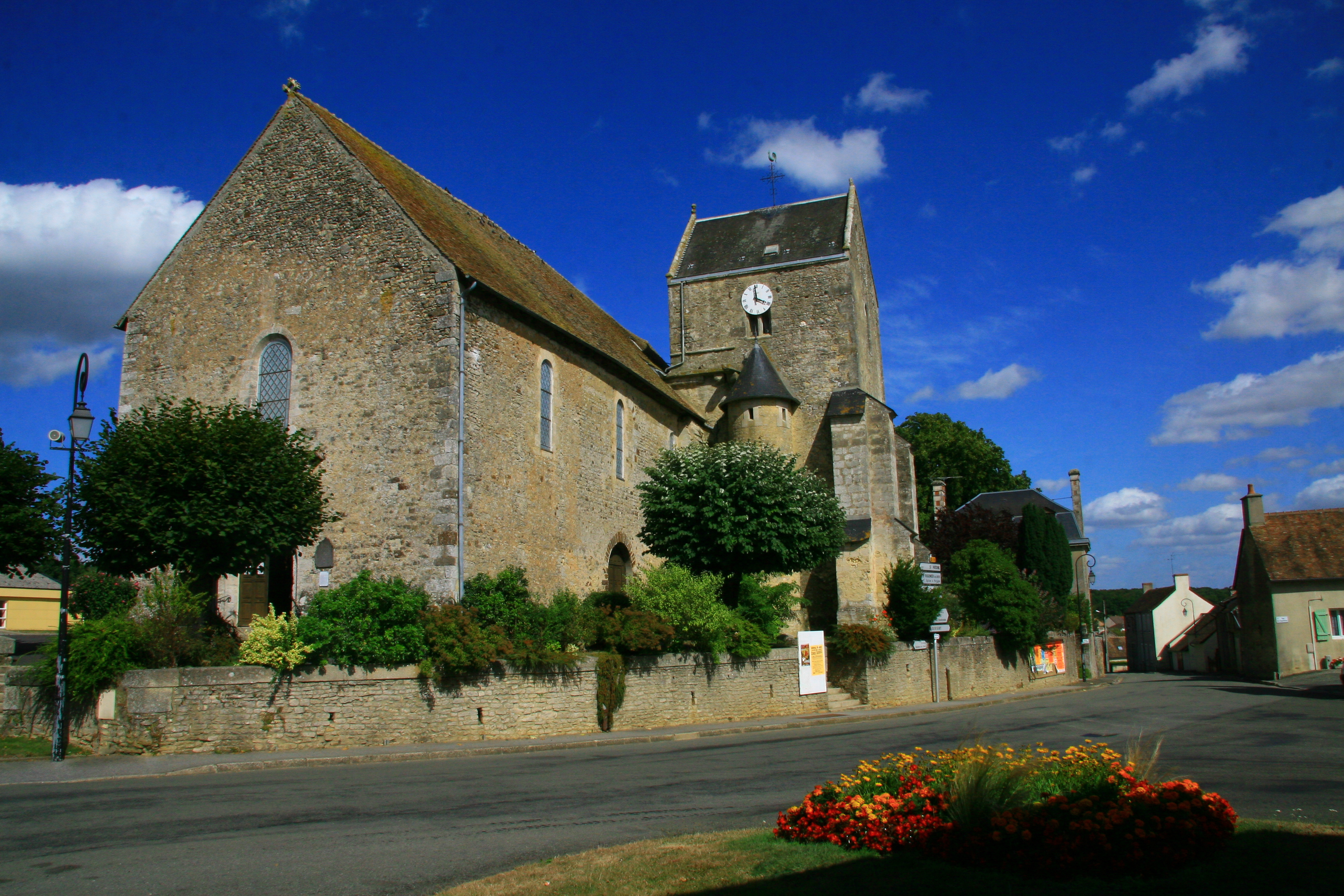
- The church in Ancinnes
- Location of Ancinnes
- Location within France Location within Pays de la Loire
- Coordinates: 48°22′06″N 0°10′39″E
- Country: France
- Region: Pays de la Loire
- Department: Sarthe
- Arrondissement: Mamers
- Canton: Sillé-le-Guillaume
- Intercommunality: Haute Sarthe Alpes Mancelles

Government
  - Mayor (2020–2026): Denis Assier
- Area^{1}: 27.21 km^{2} (10.51 sq mi)
- Highest elevation: 242 m (794 ft)
- Lowest elevation: 92 m (302 ft)
- Population (2023): 895
  - Density: 32.9/km^{2} (85.2/sq mi)
- Demonym: Ancinnois
- Time zone: UTC+01:00 (CET)
  - Summer (DST): UTC+02:00 (CEST)
- INSEE/Postal code: 72005 /72610
- ^{1} French Land Register data, which excludes lakes, ponds, glaciers > 1 km^{2} (0.386 sq mi or 247 acres) and river estuaries.

Ancinnes (French pronunciation: [ɑ̃sin]) is a commune in the Sarthe department in the region of Pays de la Loire in north-western France.The commune of Ancinnes has approximately 1,100 residents, called "Ancinnois". The village is centred on the Church of Saint Peter and Saint Paul.

== Geography ==
The commune is made up of the following collection of villages and hamlets, Le Gesmier, Ancinnes, Clos Hibou, Couesme, Montreignier, Pouplain and Ancinette.

The commune is in the Normandie-Maine Regional Natural Park.

It is 8 km from Alençon, the capital of the Orne department and the nearest major town.

== Points of Interest ==
=== National Heritage sites ===
- Manoir de Couesmes - fourteenth century manor house which was listed as a Monument historique in 2005.

== Notable people ==
- Simon de la Bretèche - (1982 – 2022)a pilot, aeronautical engineer and international aerobatic competitor who grew up in the area and is now buried here.

== See also ==
- Communes of the Sarthe department
