= Bernay-Saint-Martin =

- Commune
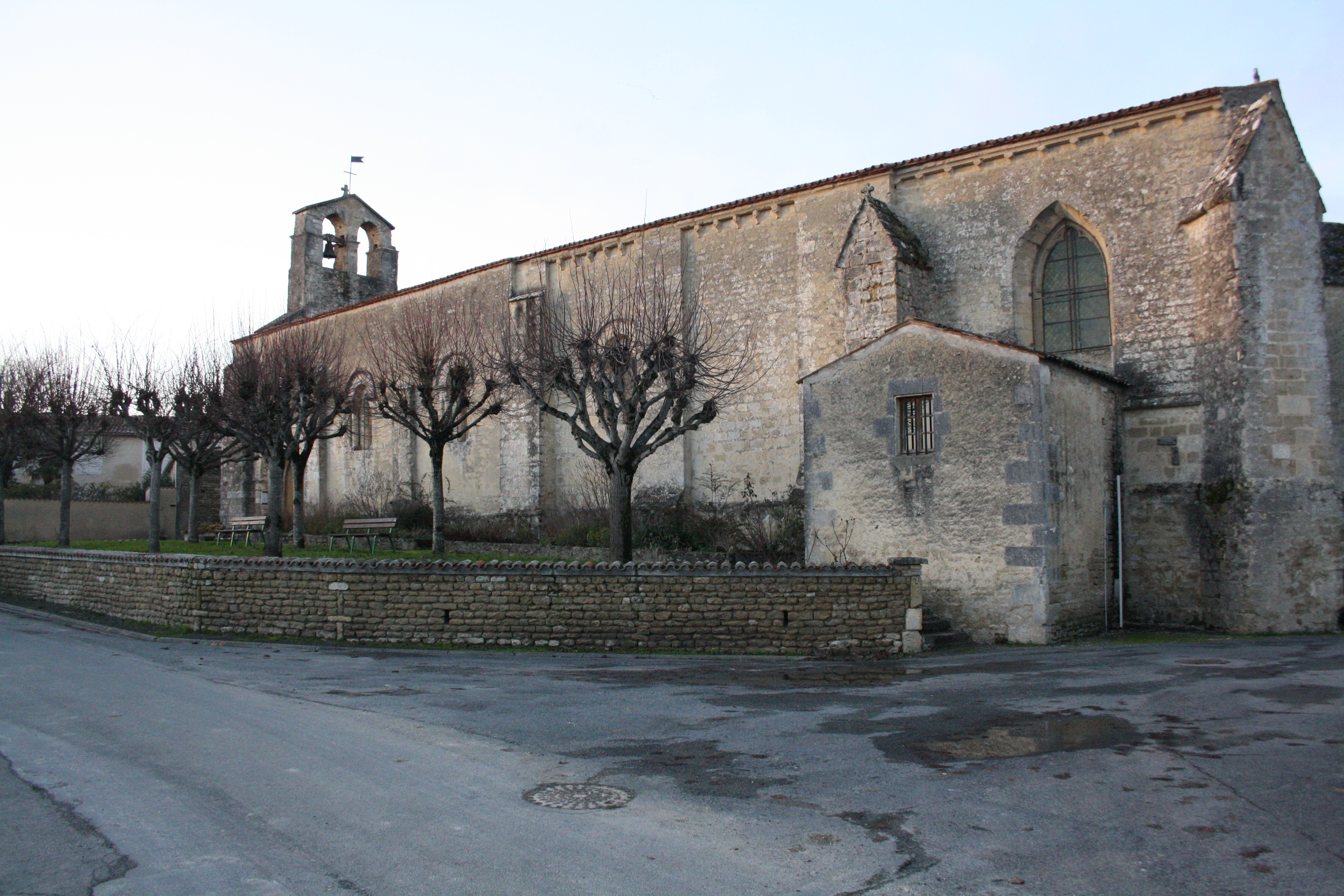
- The church in Bernay-Saint-Martin
- Location of Bernay-Saint-Martin
- Location within France Location within Nouvelle-Aquitaine
- Coordinates: 46°03′55″N 0°37′09″W
- Country: France
- Region: Nouvelle-Aquitaine
- Department: Charente-Maritime
- Arrondissement: Saint-Jean-d'Angély
- Canton: Saint-Jean-d'Angély

Government
  - Mayor (2020–2026): Annie Poinot-Rivière
- Area^{1}: 24.9 km^{2} (9.6 sq mi)
- Highest elevation: 74 m (243 ft)
- Lowest elevation: 13 m (43 ft)
- Population (2023): 770
  - Density: 31/km^{2} (80/sq mi)
- Time zone: UTC+01:00 (CET)
  - Summer (DST): UTC+02:00 (CEST)
- INSEE/Postal code: 17043 /17330
- ^{1} French Land Register data, which excludes lakes, ponds, glaciers > 1 km^{2} (0.386 sq mi or 247 acres) and river estuaries.

Bernay-Saint-Martin is a commune in the Charente-Maritime department in the Nouvelle-Aquitaine region in southwestern France.

== Population ==
Historical population
Year	Pop.	±% p.a.
1968	711	—
1975	611	−2.14%
1982	608	−0.07%
1990	657	+0.97%
1999	647	−0.17%
2007	726	+1.45%
2012	788	+1.65%
2017	767	−0.54%
2023	770	+0.07%
Source: INSEE

== See also ==
- Communes of the Charente-Maritime department
