= Aura Aero Integral R =

Integral R
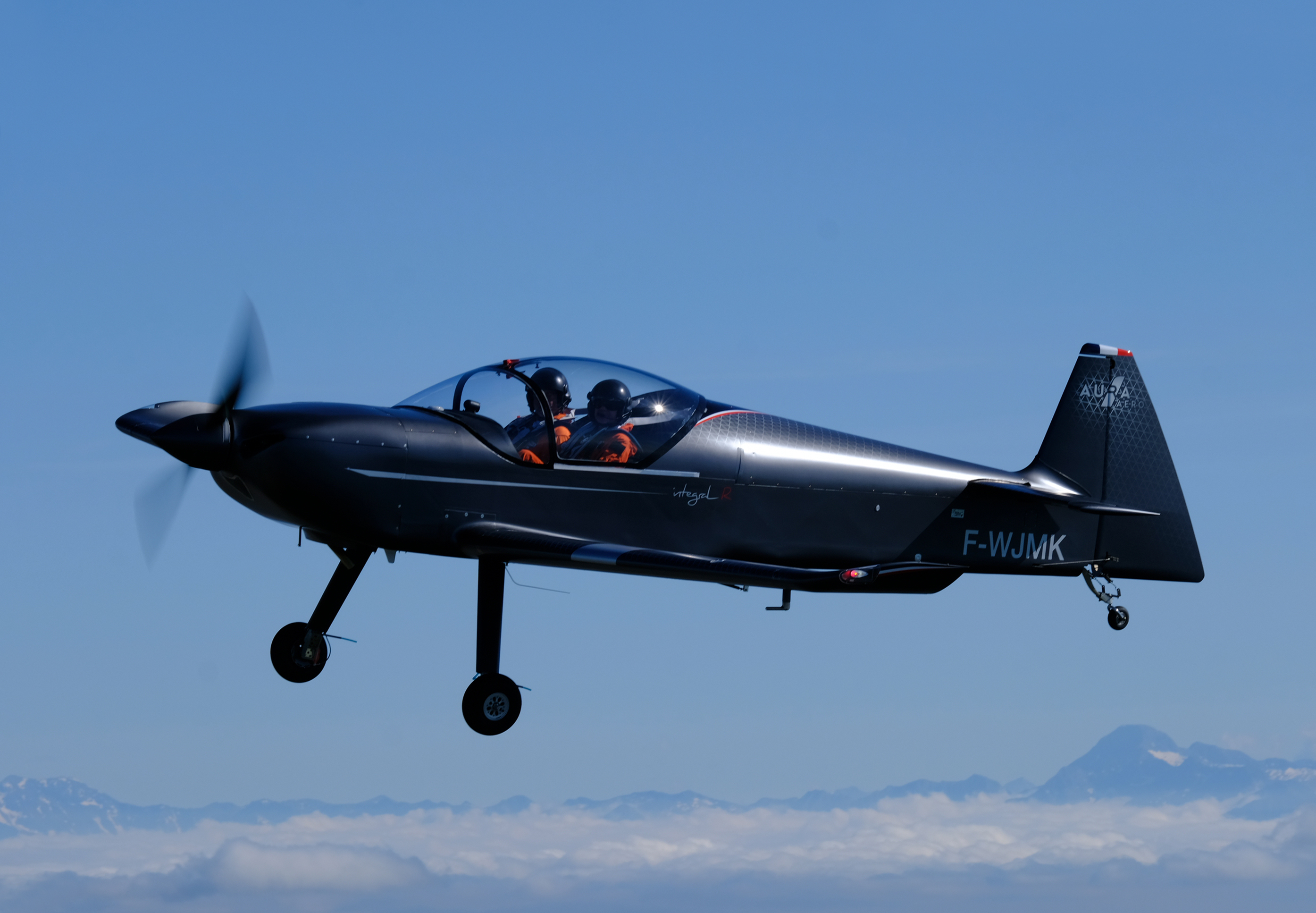

General information
- Type: Two-seat aerobatic training monoplane
- National origin: France
- Manufacturer: Aura Aero

History
- First flight: June 2020

The AURA AERO Integral R is a French two-seat aerobatic low-wing training monoplane first flown in June 2020. The aircraft is the first of a family of Integral aircraft to fly and achieved EASA Certification in the CS-23 Normal Aircraft category in December 2024.

== Design ==
The Integral R is a two-seat side by side cantilever low-wing monoplane with a fixed conventional landing gear with a tail-wheel. It has a wooden structure reinforced with carbon fibre and powered by a Lycoming AEIO-390-A3B6 piston aero-engine certified for aerobatic use with a tractor two-bladed propeller.

== Aircraft Specification ==
Data from

General characteristics

- Crew: 2
- Length: 7.26 m (23 ft 10 in)
- Wingspan: 8.78 m (28 ft 10 in)
- Height: 2.48 m (8 ft 2 in)
- Wing area: 9.97 m^{2} (107.3 sq ft)
- Fuel capacity: 159 L (42 US gal)
- Powerplant: 1 × Lycoming AEIO-390-A3B6
- Propellers: 2-bladed MT-Propeller MTV-15-B-C / C-193-25, 1.93 m (6 ft 4 in) diameter

Performance

- Stall speed: 114 km/h (71 mph, 62 kn)
- Never exceed speed: 330 km/h (210 mph, 180 kn)
- Service ceiling: 3,810 m (12,500 ft)
- g limits: +6g/-4g
