= The Masked Singer Malaysia season 3 =

The Masked Singer Malaysia
- Season 3
- Presented by: Dato' AC Mizal
- No. of contestants: 14 (Real contestants); 1 (Jury gimmick)
- Winner: Ikan Betta (Ayda Jebat)
- Runner-up: Nyoq Muda (Syamel)
- Location: Putrajaya International Convention Centre (PICC)
- No. of episodes: 11

Release
- Original network: Astro Warna; Astro Ria (Week 1 Only)
- Original release: 23 December 2022 – 3 March 2023

Season chronology
- ← Previous; TMSMY 2 (2022) Next → TMSMY 4 (2023/24)

The third season of The Masked Singer Malaysia series airs on Astro Warna from 23 December 2022 to 3 March 2023.

== Hosts & Jury ==
Datuk AC Mizal is once again entrusted to host The Masked Singer Malaysia this third season.

=== Regular judges ===
No	Celebrity	Occupation	Episode
1	Sharnaaz Ahmad	Actor, Host TV, Producer, Director	Week 1 - 11
2	Emma Maembong	Actress, Model	Week 1 - 4 / 6 - 11
3	Atu Zero	Comedian, Actor, Host	Week 1 - 11
4	Ella	Singer, Actor, Musician, Model	Week 1 - 11
5	Zul Ariffin	Actor, Model, Host TV	Week 1 - 11
6	Shuib Sepahtu	Actor, Comedian, Singer, Host TV, Radio Presenter	Week 1 - 11
7	Elly Mazlein	Singer, Actor, Comedian, Host TV, Radio Presenter	Week 1 - 11
8	Didie Alias	Comedian, Actor, Host TV	Week 1 - 11
9	Misha Omar	Singer, Songwriter, Record Producer, Lyricist, Actor, Product Spokesperson, Host TV, Businessman	Week 2 - 11

=== Guest Judge ===
No	Celebrities	Jobs	Episodes	Notes
1	Erra Fazira	Actor, Singer, Host TV, Producer	Week 5	replacing Emma Maembong.

== Contestants and Elimination ==
Position	Stage name	Celebrity	Occupation	Week										
Position	Stage name	Celebrity	Occupation	1	2	3	4	5	6	7	8	9	10	11
1	Betta Fish	Ayda Jebat	Singer and Actor	SAFE	SAFE	SAFE	SAFE	SAFE	SAFE	WIN	SAFE	SAFE	SAFE	WINNER
2	Nyoq Muda	Syamel	Singer, Composer, Lyricist & Runner-up Akademi Fantasia 2015	SAFE	SAFE	SAFE	SAFE	SAFE	RISK	SAFE	SAFE	SAFE	RISK	RUNNER-UP
3	Piza Panas	Jang Han-byul	Actor and Singer from South Korea and Champion of Big Stage Season 2	WIN	WIN	WIN	WIN	WIN	SAFE	SAFE	SAFE	SAFE	WIN	THIRD
4	Dewi Angsa	Mimi Fly	Singer	SAFE	SAFE	SAFE	SAFE	SAFE	SAFE	RISK	WIN	RISK	RISK	FINALIST (FOURTH)
5	Brokoli	Hael Husaini	Singer, Composer & Lyricist	SAFE	SAFE	SAFE	SAFE	SAFE	SAFE	SAFE	RISK	RISK	SAFE	FINALIST (FIFTH)
6	Mawar Berduri	Idayu	Singer (Akademi Fantasia Megastar)	SAFE	SAFE	SAFE	SAFE	SAFE	SAFE	WIN	RISK	WIN	OUT	
7	Bertih jagung	Zizi Kirana	Singer, Actor	SAFE	RISK	SAFE	SAFE	SAFE	RISK	SAFE	SAFE	OUT		
8	Mr. Parrot	Ajai	Composer, Producer, Singer	SAFE	SAFE	SAFE	SAFE	SAFE	SAFE	RISK	OUT			
9	Si Tangkis	Amsyar Lee	Singer, Social Media Personality	SAFE	SAFE	SAFE	SAFE	SAFE	SAFE	OUT				
10	Zirafah	Norman Hakim	Actor, Host TV, Singer	SAFE	RISK	RISK	RISK	RISK	OUT					
11	Manggis	Dato' Jalaluddin Hassan	Actor, Host TV	SAFE	SAFE	RISK	RISK	OUT						
12	Kurita	Liza Abdullah	Actor, Singer	SAFE	SAFE	SAFE	OUT							
13	Abang Burger	Dato' Malek Noor	Former National Bodybuilding Champion	RISK	SAFE	OUT								
14	Lolipop	Datuk Leong Mun Yee	Former National Diving Athlete	RISK	OUT									
15	Cik Mawas	Misha Omar	Singer, Actor, Songwriter	OUT (Jury Gimmick 9)										

== Episodes ==
=== Week 1 (23 December 2022) ===
Performances by position
No	Mascot	Song	Original Singer	Identity	Results
1	Pizza Panas	It's Gonna Be Me	NSYNC	unknown	WIN
2	Brokoli	Permata Biru	Ella	unknown	SAFE
3	Mawar Berduri	Since U Been Gone	Kelly Clarkson	unknown	SAFE
4	Nyoq Muda	Bang Bang Bang	BigBang	unknown	SAFE
5	Bertih Jagung	Lelaki Teragung	Dayang Nurfaizah	unknown	SAFE
6	Dewi Angsa	Le Gayi	Asha Bhosle	unknown	SAFE
7	Si Tangkis	Kabut Serangkai Mawar	Zaiton Sameon	unknown	SAFE
8	Mr Parrot	Sentuhan Listrikmu	Datuk M.Nasir	unknown	SAFE
9	Kurita	Di Dadaku Ada Kamu	Amelina	unknown	SAFE
10	Betta Fish	Tari Tualang Tiga	Dayang Nurfaizah	unknown	SAFE
11	Zirafah	Ada Gajah Di Balik Batu	Wali	unknown	SAFE
12	Manggis	Lemak Manis	Roslan Madun	unknown	SAFE
13	Abang Burger	Joget Kenangan Manis	Dato' Sudirman	unknown	RISK
14	Lolipop	Can't Take My Eyes Off You	Lauryn Hill	unknown	RISK
15	Cik Mawas	Maybe Today Tomorrow Or Later	Anneth Delliecia	Misha Omar	ELIMINATED

- There were no eliminations in the first week. The Mawas mascot whose identity was revealed, Misha Omar, was the 9th judge for the masked singer Malaysia season 3.

=== Week 2 (30 December 2022) ===
Performances by position
No	Mascot	Song	Original Singer	Identity	Results
1	Pizza Panas	Pelayaran	May	unknown	WIN
2	Brokoli	Dipenjara Janji	Dato' Awie	unknown	SAFE
3	Mawar Berduri	Setelah Aku Kau Miliki	Shima	unknown	SAFE
4	Betta Fish	Puncak Kasih	Ziana Zain	unknown	SAFE
5	Kurita	Joget Berhibur	Datuk Sri Siti Nurhaliza	unknown	SAFE
6	Mr Parrot	Smooth	Santana ft Rob Thomas	unknown	SAFE
7	Abang Burger	Bukan Kerana Nama	Datuk Ramli Sarip	unknown	SAFE
8	Dewi Angsa	Hatinya Tak Tahan	Noraniza Idris	unknown	SAFE
9	Manggis	Blue Suede Shoes	Elvis Presley	unknown	SAFE
10	Si Tangkis	Pematah Hati	Nabila Razali	unknown	SAFE
11	Nyoq Muda	Perpisahan Terasing	KRU	unknown	SAFE
12	Bertih Jagung	Raikan Cinta	Datuk M. Nasir	unknown	RISK
13	Zirafah	Kau Aku	Aizat Amdan	unknown	RISK
14	Lolipop	Sha Na Na	Amy Mastura	Datuk Leong Mun Yee	ELIMINATED

=== Week 3 (6 January 2023) ===
Performances by position
No	Mascot	Song	Original Singer	Identity	Result
1	Pizza Panas	Bagaimana Kalau Aku Tidak Baik-Baik Saja	Judika	unknown	WIN
2	Brokoli	Mimpi	K-Clique	unknown	SAFE
3	Si Tangkis	Putus Terpaksa	Ziana Zain	unknown	SAFE
4	Nyoq Muda	You Give Love a Bad Name	Bon Jovi	unknown	SAFE
5	Bertih Jagung	I Don't Want to Miss a Thing	Aerosmith	unknown	SAFE
6	Betta Fish	Apa Nak Dikata	XPDC	unknown	SAFE
7	Mawar Berduri	Boneka	Ernie Zakri	unknown	SAFE
8	Dewi Angsa	The Best	Tina Turner	unknown	SAFE
9	Mr Parrot	Hanya Di Radio	Headwind	unknown	SAFE
10	Kurita	Yang Terindah Hanyalah Sementara	Erra Fazira	unknown	SAFE
11	Zirafah	Bila Resah	Anuar Zain	unknown	RISK
12	Manggis	Oh! Mama, I Want to Get Married	Blues Gang	unknown	RISK
13	Abang Burger	Mat Disco	Datuk Sudirman	Datuk Malek Nor	ELIMINATED

=== Week 4 (13 January 2023) ===
Performances by position
No	Mascot	Song	Original Singer	Identity	Results
1	Pizza Panas	Kau Sakiti	Amir Masdi	unknown	WIN
2	Brokoli	Ah Rindu Lagi	Amelina	unknown	SAFE
3	Betta Fish	Saat Hilang Cintamuu	Siti Sarah	unknown	SAFE
4	Mawar Berduri	Siapa Tak Mahu	Dato' Sri Siti Nurhaliza	unknown	SAFE
5	Bertih Jagung	Jerangkung Dalam Almari	Wings	unknown	SAFE
6	Mr. Parrot	Mengerti	KRU	unknown	SAFE
7	Nyoq Muda	Kau Bunga Cintaku	Anuar Zain	unknown	SAFE
8	Si Tangkis	Chandelier	Sia	unknown	SAFE
9	Dewi Angsa	Biru Mata Hitamku	Wings	unknown	SAFE
10	Zirafah	Tiara	Kris	unknown	RISK
11	Manggis	Hati Yang Luka	Broery Marantika	unknown	RISK
12	Kurita	Rindu	Hetty Koes Endang	Liza Abdullah	ELIMINATED

=== Week 5 (20 January 2023) ===
Performance by position
No	Mascot	Song	Original Singer	Identity	Decision
1	Pizza Panas	Highway To Hell	AC/DC	unknown	WIN
2	Brokoli	The Cup of Life	Ricky Martin	unknown	SAFE
3	Nyoq Muda	Lara	Naim Daniel, Hael Husaini & Haqiem Rusli	unknown	SAFE
4	Betta Fish	Money	Lisa	unknown	SAFE
5	Mawar Berduri	Simalakama	Vita Alvia	unknown	SAFE
6	Dewi Angsa	Ku Ikhlaskan	Dato' Seri Vida	unknown	SAFE
7	Mr. Parrot	Kau Kekasihku	Dato' Sri Siti Nurhaliza	unknown	SAFE
8	Si Tangkis	Oh My Darling	Alisha Chinai & Sonu Nigam	unknown	SAFE
9	Bertih Jagung	Akulah Kekasihmu	Francisca Peter	unknown	RISK
10	Zirafah	Angguk-Angguk Geleng-Geleng	Ahli Fiqir	unknown	RISK
11	Manggis	Si Gadis Ayu	Black Dog Bone	Dato' Jalaluddin Hassan	ELIMINATED

=== Week 6 (27 January 2023) ===
Performances by position
No	Mascot	Song	Original Singer	Identity	Results
1	Betta Fish	She's Gone	Steelheart	unknown	WIN
2	Mawar Berduri	Cinta	Marsha Milan	unknown	SAFE
3	Brokoli	Mencari Konklusi	Hujan	unknown	SAFE
4	Dewi Angsa	Di Pintu Syurga	Dayang Nurfaizah	unknown	SAFE
5	Piza Panas	Havoc	Joe Flizzow feat Altimet & SonaOne	unknown	SAFE
6	Mr. Parrot	Pelesit Kota	Search	unknown	SAFE
7	Si Tangkis	Kau Kunci Cinta Di Dalam Hatimu	Ramlah Ram	unknown	SAFE
8	Nyoq Muda	Orak Arek	Datuk Zainal Abidin	unknown	RISK
9	Bertih Jagung	Hands Up	2PM	unknown	RISK
10	Zirafah	Lekaki Seperti Aku	Alif Satar	Norman Hakim	ELIMINATED

=== Week 7 (3 February 2023) ===
Performances by position
No	Mascot	Song	Original Singer	Identity	Results
1	Mawar Berduri	Rock You Like a Hurricane	Scorpions	unknown	WIN
2	Nyoq Muda	Bamboléo	Gipsy Kings	unknown	SAFE
3	Brokoli	Jangan Bersedih Lagi	Anuar Zain	unknown	SAFE
4	Pizza Panas	Balqis	Siti Nurhaliza	unknown	SAFE
5	Bertih Jagung	Laksamana Raja Di Laut	Iyeth Bustami	unknown	SAFE
6	Betta Fish	Sepi Sekuntum Mawar Merah	Ella	unknown	SAFE
7	Mr Parrot	Believer	Imagine Dragons	unknown	RISK
8	Dewi Angsa	Girl on Fire	Alicia Keys	unknown	RISK
9	Si Tangkis	Angkara	Siti Nordiana	Amsyar Lee	ELIMINATED

=== Week 8 (10 February 2023) ===
Performances by position
No	Mascot	Song	Original Singer	Identity	Results
1	Dewi Angsa	Objection	Shakira	unknown	WIN
2	Pizza Panas	Sampai Syurga	Faizal Tahir	unknown	SAFE
3	Betta Fish	Drama	Nikki Palikat, Ning Baizura & Yanie	unknown	SAFE
4	Bertih Jagung	Bohemian Rhapsody	Queen	unknown	SAFE
5	Nyoq Muda	Kejoraku Bersatu	Search	unknown	SAFE
6	Mawar Berduri	Teman Subsidiar	Black Hanifah & Malique	unknown	RISK
7	Brokoli	Kasih Latifah	Tam Spider	unknown	RISK
8	Mr Parrot	Seberapa Pentas	Sheila on 7	Ajai	ELIMINATED

=== Week 9 (February 17, 2023) ===
Performances by position
No	Mascot	Song	Original Singer	Identity	Results
1	Mawar Berduri	Sedalam Mana Cintamu	Safura	unknown	WIN
2	Piza Panas	Sudah Ku Tahu	Projector Band	unknown	SAFE
3	Nyoq Muda	What's Up?	4 Non Blondes	unknown	SAFE
4	Betta Fish	Matahariku	Agnes Monica	unknown	SAFE
5	Dewi Angsa	Semua Jadi Satu	3 Diva	unknown	RISK
6	Brokoli	Helena	My Chemical Romance	unknown	RISK
7	Bertih Jagung	Akar & Bumi	Amuk	Zizi Kirana	ELIMINATED

=== Week 10 (24 February 2023) ===
Performances by position
No	Mascot	Song	Original Singer	Identity	Results
1	Pizza Panas	Eye of the Tiger	Survivor	unknown	WIN
2	Betta Fish	Sesal Separuh Nyawa	Alyah	unknown	SAFE
3	Brokoli	Januari	Glenn Fredly	unknown	SAFE
4	Nyoq Muda	Jeritan Batinku	P. Ramlee	unknown	RISK
5	Dewi Angsa	Conga	Gloria Estefan	unknown	RISK
6	Mawar Berduri	Samar Bayangan	Nicky Astria	Idayu AF	ELIMINATED

Duet performance
No	Mascot	Song	Original Singer
1	Brokoli vs Dewi Angsa	Marabahaya	Pop Shuvit
2	Mawar Berduri vs Betta Fish	Heart Attack	Demi Lovato
3	Pizza Panas vs Nyoq Muda	Gemuruh	Awie feat Amy Search

=== Week 11 (3 March 2023) ===
Performances by position
No	Mascot	Song (Round 1)	Original Singer	Song (Round 2)	Original Singer	Guest Duet Artist	Identity	Results
1	Betta Fish	Titanium	David Guetta & Sia	Salam Terakhir	Sudirman Hj Arshad	Marsha Milan Londoh	Ayda Jebat	WINNER
2	Nyoq Muda	Bukan Rayuan Gombal	Judika	Regresa a Mí	Il Divo	Idris Brown	Syamel	RUNNER-UP
3	Pizza Panas	Hilang Naluri	Once Mekel	Srikandi Cintaku	Bloodshed	Amir Masdi	Jang Han-byul	THIRD
4	Dewi Angsa	Ikut Rentakku	Jaclyn Victor	Penasaran	Krisdayanti	Sophia Liana	Mimifly	FINALIST
5	Brokoli	My Heart Will Go On	Celine Dion	Senja Nan Merah	Awie & Ziana Zain	Ernie Zakri	Hael Husaini	FINALIST
