= The Masked Singer Malaysia season 1 =

The Masked Singer Malaysia
- Season 1
- Starring: Bunga Raya; Rajah Brooke; Wau; Rafflesia; ABC; Orang Utan; Ayam Jantan; Musang King; Rimau; Nasi Lemak; Reno; Enggang
- Presented by: Dato' AC Mizal
- No. of contestants: 12
- Winner: Bunga Raya (Aina Abdul)
- Runner-up: Rajah Brooke (Vanessa Reynauld)
- Location: Royal Teater Shah Alam
- No. of episodes: 8

Release
- Original network: Astro Warna
- Original release: 18 September – 6 November 2020

Season chronology
- ← Previous; AF Megastar Next → TMSMY 2 (2022)

The first season of series The Masked Singer Malaysia aired on Astro Warna at 21:00 (Prime Malaysia Time), Friday with a total of eight episodes from 18 September until 6 November 2020.

== Host and panelist ==
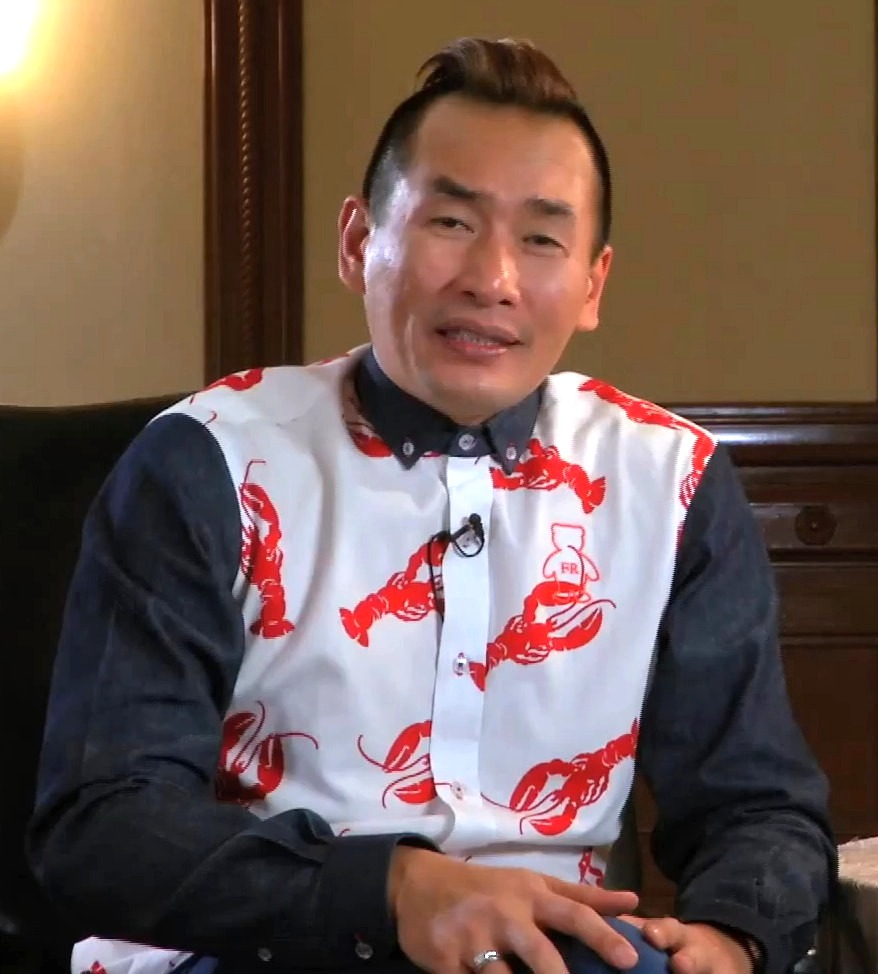
AC Mizal serves as the host.

The program presented and hosted by the nation's well known entertainer, Dato' AC Mizal. The panelist consisting of nine popular local celebrities who played role as permanent jury.

=== Permanent jury members ===
Celebrity	Occupation	Episodes
Datuk Aznil Nawawi	Entertainer, TV host, director, actor, singer, writer and radio presenter	Week 1 - 8
Michael Ang	Director, producer, actor and screenwriter	Week 1 - 8
Raja Azura	Actress, comedian, TV host, singer, entertainer and radio presenter	Week 1 - 8
Ella	Musician, singer, actress, model and entrepreneur	Week 1 - 4, 6 - 8
Nabila Huda	Actress, TV host and model	Week 1 - 8
Zizan Razak	Comedian, actor, TV personality, rapper, singer and businessman	Week 1 - 7
Angah	Comedian, actor, TV host and radio presenter	Week 1 - 8
Remy Ishak	Actor, TV host, model and singer	Week 1 - 8
Ramona Zamzam	Actress, model, TV host and businesswoman	Week 1 - 8

=== Guest jury ===
Celebrity	Occupation	Episodes
Janna Nick	Actress, TV host and singer	Week 5
Mark Adam	Singer, vocal trainer and actor	Week 8

== Contestants and Elimination ==
Stage name	Celebrity	Occupation	Week							
Stage name	Celebrity	Occupation	1	2	3	4	5	6	7	8
Bunga Raya (hibiscus)	Aina Abdul	Singer and actress (Runner-up of Mentor Legend)	SAFE	WIN	SAFE	RISK	SAFE	SAFE	WIN	WINNER
Rajah Brooke (butterfly)	Vanessa Reynauld	Multilingual singer and social media influencer	SAFE	SAFE	WIN	WIN	WIN	RISK	SAFE	RUNNER-UP
Orang Utan (orangutan)	Tuju K-Clique	Rapper, lyricist and composer	WIN	SAFE	RISK	RISK	SAFE	SAFE	RISK	THIRD
Wau (kite)	Datin Alyah	Singer and entrepreneur (Winner of Bintang HMI 2000)	SAFE	SAFE	SAFE	SAFE	RISK	RISK	RISK	FINALIST ^{(4th)}
Enggang (hornbill)	Vince Chong	Singer and songwriter (1st winner of Akademi Fantasia)	SAFE	SAFE	SAFE	SAFE	SAFE	WIN	SAFE	FINALIST ^{(5th)}
Rafflesia (largest flower)	Datin Paduka Eina Azman	Actress, model and brand ambassador	SAFE	SAFE	SAFE	SAFE	SAFE	SAFE	OUT	
Reno (rhino)	Chiwan Chilok	Comedian, TV personality and actor	RISK	SAFE	SAFE	SAFE	RISK	OUT		
Ayam Jantan (rooster)	Hairul Azreen	Actor, model, stuntman and martial artist	SAFE	SAFE	RISK	SAFE	OUT			
Musang King (durian)	Zain Hamid	Actor and singer from Ruffedge	SAFE	RISK	SAFE	OUT				
ABC (bean ice)	Yana Samsudin	Actress, director, TV personality and singer	RISK	RISK	OUT					
Rimau (tiger)	Ebby Saiful	Director, actor, composer and singer	SAFE	OUT						
Nasi Lemak (rice dish)	Dato' Mirnawan Nawawi	Former field hockey player	OUT							

The masked singer won the 1st place ranking and remained in the competition.
The masked singer was safe from elimination and was not in the bottom three.
The masked singer was in the bottom three but was not eliminated.
The masked singer was eliminated from the competition and unmasked upon their elimination.

== Episodes ==
=== Week 1 (18 September 2020) ===
Performances based on ranking
#	Stage name	Song	Identity	Result	Marks %
1	Orang Utan	"Sinaran" by Dato' Sheila Majid	undisclosed	WIN	87.11%
2	Rimau	"Musafir Rindu" by Datuk Ramli Sarip	undisclosed	SAFE	83.00%
3	Rafflesia	"Bossanova" by Wann	undisclosed	SAFE	80.33%
4	Ayam Jantan	"Hutang" by Floor88	undisclosed	SAFE	78.22%
5	Bunga Raya	"Ngajat Tampi" by Noraniza Idris	undisclosed	SAFE	75.44%
6	Enggang	"Donde" by Andi Bernadee	undisclosed	SAFE	73.11%
7	Rajah Brooke	"Pencuri Hati" by Ayda Jebat	undisclosed	SAFE	71.78%
8	Wau	"Vroom Vroom" by Nabila Razali	undisclosed	SAFE	68.56%
9	Musang King	"Pagi Yang Gelap" by Hujan	undisclosed	SAFE	68.56%
10	Reno	"Amboi" by Altimet	undisclosed	RISK	66.89%
11	ABC	Remix of "Ais Kacang" (Primary school's song) & "I Am Me" by Datuk Seri Vida	undisclosed	RISK	64.67%
12	Nasi Lemak	"Anak Kampung" by Jimmy Pelikat	Dato' Mirnawan Nawawi	OUT	59.33%

=== Week 2 (25 September 2020) ===
Performances based on ranking
#	Stage name	Song	Identity	Result	Marks %
1	Bunga Raya	"Hareudang Hareudang" by Vita Alvia	undisclosed	WIN	84%
2	Orang Utan	"Pop Yeah Yeah" by V.E	undisclosed	SAFE	84%
3	Wau	"Melompat Lebih Tinggi" by Sheila on 7	undisclosed	SAFE	81%
4	Rafflesia	"Goyang Bali" by Mas Idayu	undisclosed	SAFE	81%
5	Rajah Brooke	"Akhirnya Kini Pasti" by Anita Sarawak	undisclosed	SAFE	80%
6	Ayam Jantan	"Hukum Karma" by Wings	undisclosed	SAFE	79%
7	Reno	"Lelaki Di Telefon" by Afieq Shazwan	undisclosed	SAFE	75%
8	Enggang	"Cek Mek Molek" by Dato' M. Daud Kilau	undisclosed	SAFE	71%
9	ABC	"Sangat Cute" by Harith Zazman	undisclosed	RISK	70%
10	Musang King	"Pencuri" by Mark Adam	undisclosed	RISK	69%
11	Rimau	"I Want You To Love Me" by Alif Satar	Ebby Saiful	OUT	69%

=== Week 3 (2 October 2020) ===
Performances based on ranking
#	Stage name	Song	Identity	Result	Marks %
1	Rajah Brooke	"Paku" by Ara Johari	undisclosed	WIN	90%
2	Reno	"Hanya Rindu" by Andamesh Kamaleng	undisclosed	SAFE	90%
3	Rafflesia	"Retak" by Ella	undisclosed	SAFE	83%
4	Enggang	"Ingat-Ingat" by Amuk	undisclosed	SAFE	81%
5	Bunga Raya	"Kalau Berpacaran" by Ana Raffali, Sohaimi Mior Hassan & Altimet	undisclosed	SAFE	81%
6	Musang King	"Fly Me to the Moon" by Jazz Lag	undisclosed	SAFE	81%
7	Wau	"Dag Dig Dug" by Haiza	undisclosed	SAFE	77%
8	Ayam Jantan	"Memburu Impian" by Kumpulan Kristal	undisclosed	RISK	77%
9	Orang Utan	"Kopi Dangdut" by Fahmi Shahab	undisclosed	RISK	74%
10	ABC	"Aku Bidadari Syurgamu" by Dato' Sri Siti Nurhaliza	Yana Samsudin	OUT	72%

=== Week 4 (9 October 2020) ===
Performances based on ranking
#	Stage name	Song	Identity	Result	Marks %
1	Rajah Brooke	"Sumpah" by Aina Abdul	undisclosed	WIN	96%
2	Reno	"Sedang Ingin Bercinta" by Dewa 19	undisclosed	SAFE	91%
3	Ayam Jantan	"Farhana" by Jinbara	undisclosed	SAFE	89%
4	Enggang	"Jampi" by Hael Husaini	undisclosed	SAFE	87%
5	Wau	"Kesal" by Ella	undisclosed	SAFE	87%
6	Rafflesia	"Sayang" by Via Vallen	undisclosed	SAFE	86%
7	Orang Utan	"Joget Angan Tak Sudah" by Jay Jay	undisclosed	RISK	85%
8	Bunga Raya	"Perhaps" by The Pussycat Dolls	undisclosed	RISK	80%
9	Musang King	"Situasi" by Bunkface	Zain Hamid	OUT	67%

=== Week 5 (16 October 2020) ===
Performances based on ranking
#	Stage name	Song	Identity	Result	Marks %
1	Rajah Brooke	"Romancinta" by Mojo	undisclosed	WIN	95%
2	Enggang	"Drama" by Drama Band	undisclosed	SAFE	93%
3	Rafflesia	"Makhluk Tuhan Paling Sexy" by Mulan Jameela	undisclosed	SAFE	88%
4	Bunga Raya	"Lagu Untukmu" by Meet Uncle Hussain	undisclosed	SAFE	85%
5	Orang Utan	"Potret" by Akim & The Majistret	undisclosed	SAFE	79%
6	Wau	"Nirmala" by Dato' Sri Siti Nurhaliza	undisclosed	RISK	79%
7	Reno	"Budi Setahun Segunung Intan" by Ahmad Jais	undisclosed	RISK	77%
8	Ayam Jantan	"Cinta Dewa Dewi" by Spider	Hairul Azreen	OUT	72%

=== Week 6 (23 October 2020) ===
Performances based on ranking
#	Stage name	Song	Identity	Result	Marks %
1	Enggang	"Awan Yang Terpilu" by Ning Baizura	undisclosed	WIN	90%
2	Bunga Raya	"Mengapa" by Nicky Astria	undisclosed	SAFE	89%
3	Orang Utan	"Seksis" by Anita Sarawak	undisclosed	SAFE	84%
4	Rafflesia	"Tiada Lagi Kidungmu" by Lefthanded	undisclosed	SAFE	81%
5	Rajah Brooke	"Akan Ku Tunggu" by Candy	undisclosed	RISK	73%
6	Wau	"Hilang" by Najwa Latif	undisclosed	RISK	72%
7	Reno	"Khayalan" by Ruffedge & VE	Chiwan Chilok	OUT	72%

=== Week 7 (30 October 2020) ===
Performances based on ranking
#	Stage name	Song	Identity	Result	Marks %
1	Bunga Raya	"Gemilang" by Jaclyn Victor	undisclosed	WIN	96%
2	Rajah Brooke	"Bukan Dia Tapi Aku" by Judika	undisclosed	SAFE	94%
3	Enggang	"Uptown Funk" by Bruno Mars	undisclosed	SAFE	91%
4	Orang Utan	"Seribu Tahun" by Imran Ajmain	undisclosed	RISK	90%
5	Wau	"Bunga-Bunga Cinta" by Misha Omar	undisclosed	RISK	89%
6	Rafflesia	"I Will Survive" by Gloria Gaynor & "Survivor" by Destiny's Child	Datin Paduka Eina Azman	OUT	78%

Duet performances
#	Singers	Song
1	Rajah Brooke & Bunga Raya	"This Is Me" by Keala Settle & The Greatest Showman Ensemble
2	Wau & Rafflesia	"Drama King" by Meet Uncle Hussain & Black
3	Enggang & Orang Utan	"Satu" by Tan Sri S. M. Salim & Datuk Zainal Abidin

=== Week 8 (6 November 2020) ===
Performances based on ranking
#	Stage name	Song	Identity	Result	Marks %
1	Bunga Raya	^{1st round:} "Listen" by Beyonce^{2nd round:} "Malam Ini Kita Punya" by Bunkface	Aina Abdul	WINNER	96%
2	Rajah Brooke	^{1st round:} "Ku Bersuara" by Ernie Zakri^{2nd round:} "Rampas" by Akim & The Majistret	Vanessa Reynauld	RUNNER-UP	95%
3	Orang Utan	^{1st round:} "Dia" by Anji^{2nd round:} "Apa Khabar" & "Sang Saka Biru" by Joe Flizzow, Altimet, SonaOne, Alif	Tuju K-Clique	THIRD	94%
4	Wau	^{1st round:} "I Surrender" by Celine Dion^{2nd round:} "Opera Hidup" by Wings & "Pawana" by Search	Datin Alyah	FINALIST	88%
5	Enggang	^{1st round:} "Tiada Lagi" by Amy Search^{2nd round:} "Generasiku" by OAG	Vince Chong	FINALIST	87%

== See also ==
- The Masked Singer Malaysia
- The Masked Singer Malaysia (season 2)
- Masked Singer
- Astro Warna
- Akademi Fantasia
- I Can See Your Voice Malaysia
