= The Masked Singer Malaysia season 2 =

The Masked Singer Malaysia
- Season 2
- Starring: Rambutan; Ratu Semut; Si Merak; Pepatung; Aiskrim Roti; Orkid; Burung Hantu; Periuk Kera; Seladang; Mat Penyu; Nanas; Harum Manis; Bujang Senang; Teh Tarik Kaw
- Presented by: Dato' AC Mizal
- No. of contestants: 14
- Winner: Rambutan (Shila Amzah)
- Runner-up: Seladang (Amir Masdi)
- Location: Putrajaya International Convention Centre (Pusat Konvensyen Antarabangsa Putrajaya)(PICC)
- No. of episodes: 10

Release
- Original network: Astro Warna
- Original release: 28 January – 1 April 2022

Season chronology
- ← Previous; TMSMY 1 (2020) Next → TMSMY 3 (2022/23)

The second season of series The Masked Singer Malaysia was broadcast on Astro Warna from 28 January to 1 April 2022.

== Host and panelist ==
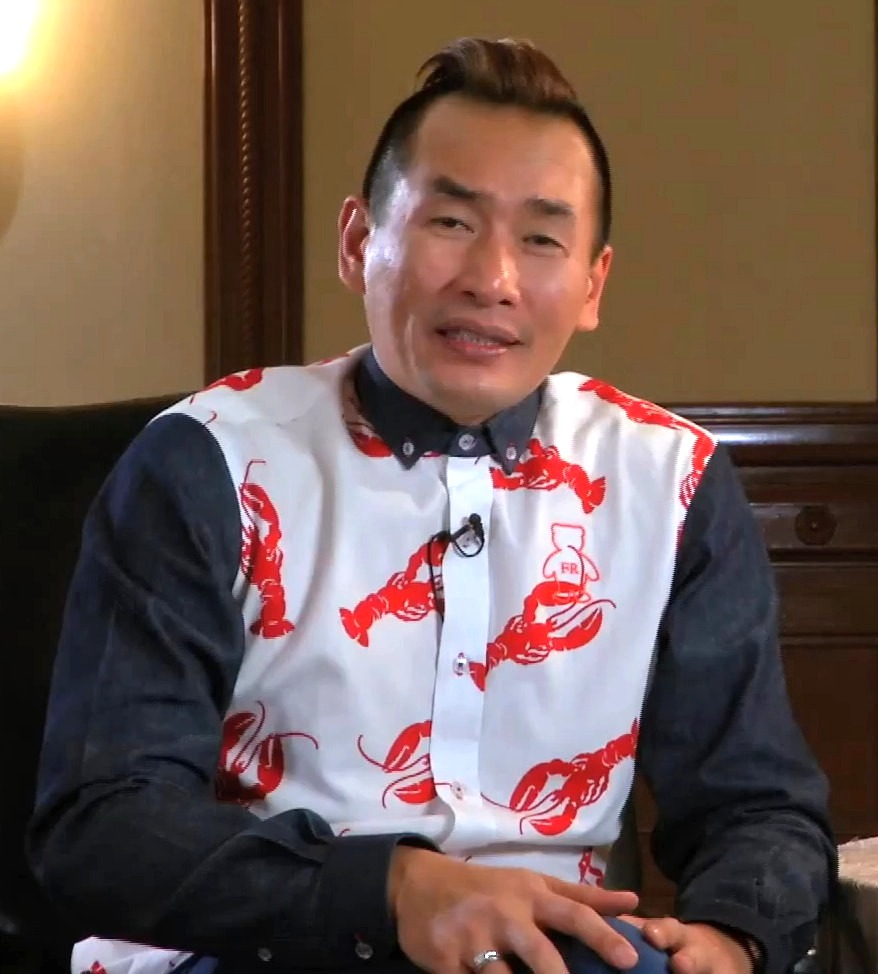
AC Mizal serves as the host.

The second season presented by the same host, Dato' AC Mizal. The panelist consisting of nine popular local celebrities who played role as permanent jury.

=== Permanent jury members ===
Celebrity	Occupation	Episodes
Datuk Aznil Nawawi	Entertainer, TV host, director, actor, singer, writer and radio presenter	Week 1 - 10
Michael Ang	Director, producer, actor and screenwriter	Week 1 - 10
Raja Azura	Actress, comedian, TV host, singer, entertainer and radio presenter	Week 1 - 10
Ella	Musician, singer, actress, model and entrepreneur	Week 1 - 10
Amy Mastura	Singer and actress	Week 1 - 10
Zizan Razak	Comedian, actor, TV personality, rapper, singer and businessman	Week 1 - 10
Angah	Comedian, actor, TV host and radio presenter	Week 1 - 10
Remy Ishak	Actor, TV host, model and singer	Week 1, 3, 5 - 10
Ramona Zamzam	Actress, model, TV host and businesswoman	Week 1 - 10

=== Guest jury ===
Celebrity	Occupation	Episodes
Sharnaaz Ahmad	Actor	Week 2
Emma Maembong	Actress	Week 4

== Format ==
The second season follows the same format as per first season. However, at the end of each episode, all juries are required to give one name before the celebrity's identity is revealed. Each jury will be given one mark for each correct guess and the jury with the highest mark will be awarded with "The Best Guess Jury" in the final episode.

== Contestants and Elimination ==
Stage name	Celebrity	Occupation	Week									
Stage name	Celebrity	Occupation	1	2	3	4	5	6	7	8	9	10
Rambutan (rambutan)	Shila Amzah	Singer-songwriter and actress Asian Wave 2012 Winner	SAFE	WIN	SAFE	SAFE	SAFE	WIN	SAFE	SAFE	WIN	WINNER
Seladang (gaur)	Amir Masdi	Singer-songwriter and actor Akademi Fantasia 2016 Winner	SAFE	SAFE	SAFE	SAFE	SAFE	SAFE	SAFE	WIN	SAFE	RUNNER-UP
Orkid (orchid)	Liza Hanim	Singer, actress & entrepreneur AJL17 Best Vocal Award	SAFE	SAFE	RISK	RISK	WIN	SAFE	WIN	SAFE	SAFE	THIRD
Burung Hantu (owl)	Hannah Delisha	Actress and singer APM2017 Most Popular Singaporean Artist	SAFE	SAFE	WIN	WIN	SAFE	SAFE	SAFE	SAFE	RISK	FINALIST ^{(4th)}
Ratu Semut (queen ant)	Ara Johari	Singer, lyricist and actress Anugerah Juara Lagu 33 Runner Up	SAFE	SAFE	SAFE	SAFE	RISK	RISK	SAFE	RISK	RISK	FINALIST ^{(5th)}
Si Merak (peacock)	Sherry Ibrahim	Actress and entrepreneur Gempak Superstar 2016 Runner Up	SAFE	SAFE	SAFE	SAFE	SAFE	SAFE	RISK	RISK	OUT	
Bujang Senang (humanoid crocodile)	Sabhi Saddi	Singer and actor Gegar Vaganza 6 Finalist	WIN	SAFE	SAFE	SAFE	SAFE	RISK	RISK	OUT		
Periuk Kera (pitcher plant)	Resh	Singer-songwriter and actor AIM 11 & 14 Best Male Vocalist	SAFE	SAFE	SAFE	SAFE	RISK	SAFE	OUT			
Mat Penyu (turtle)	Zul Huzaimy	Actor and director FFM21 Best Supporting Actor	SAFE	SAFE	SAFE	RISK	SAFE	OUT				
Aiskrim Roti (ice cream bread)	Iman Troye	Singer and media influencer	SAFE	SAFE	SAFE	SAFE	OUT					
Teh Tarik Kaw (teh tarik)	Sazali Samad	National bodybuilder 10 times World Champion Mr. Universe	SAFE	RISK	RISK	OUT						
Pepatung (dragonfly)	Maria Farida	Actress	RISK	RISK	OUT							
Nanas (pineapple)	Keifli Othman	Professional race car driver	RISK	OUT								
Harum Manis (mango)	Ray Era	Radio ERA Fm presenter	OUT									

The masked singer won the 1st place ranking and remained in the competition.
The masked singer was safe from elimination and was not in the bottom three.
The masked singer was in the bottom three but was not eliminated.
The masked singer was eliminated from the competition and unmasked upon their elimination.

== Episodes ==
=== Week 1 (28 January 2022) ===
Performances based on ranking
#	Stage name	Song	Identity	Result	Marks %
1	Bujang Senang	"Yank" by Wali	undisclosed	WIN	91.00
2	Si Merak	"Let's Get Loud" by Jennifer Lopez	undisclosed	SAFE	87.67
3	Aiskrim Roti	"Isabella" by Search	undisclosed	SAFE	85.67
4	Periuk Kera	"Jangan Marah (Baby Sayang)" by Da Unknown	undisclosed	SAFE	85.22
5	Mat Penyu	"Gemuruh" by Faizal Tahir	undisclosed	SAFE	84.44
6	Rambutan	"Kurik Kundi" by Datuk Sri Siti Nurhaliza	undisclosed	SAFE	84.44
7	Seladang	"Kembali Merindu" by Slam	undisclosed	SAFE	82.22
8	Burung Hantu	"Rindu" by Amelina/"Secangkir Madu Merah" by Sheeda	undisclosed	SAFE	81.22
9	Orkid	"Kucu Kuca" by Lia Aziz	undisclosed	SAFE	75.22
10	Ratu Semut	"Dikir Puteri" by Noraniza Idris	undisclosed	SAFE	72.67
11	Teh Tarik Kaw	"Kenangan Bersamamu" by Lefthanded	undisclosed	SAFE	63.78
12	Pepatung	"Teman Tapi Mesra" by Ratu	undisclosed	RISK	62.22
13	Nanas	"Itik Gembo Gembo" by A to Z	undisclosed	RISK	60.78
14	Harum Manis	"Ooh! La! La!" by KRU	Ray Era	OUT	59.67

=== Week 2 (4 February 2022) ===
Performances based on ranking
#	Stage name	Song	Identity	Result	Marks %
1	Rambutan	"Impikan" by Dolla	undisclosed	WIN	N/A
2	Burung Hantu	"Sakit" by Zynakal ft Yonnyboii	undisclosed	SAFE	N/A
3	Ratu Semut	"Zombie" by The Cranberries	undisclosed	SAFE	N/A
4	Bujang Senang	"Amalina" by Santesh	undisclosed	SAFE	N/A
5	Seladang	"Dancing Queen" by ABBA	undisclosed	SAFE	N/A
6	Aiskrim Roti	"Malam Pesta Muda Mudi" by Saloma	undisclosed	SAFE	N/A
7	Mat Penyu	"1,2,3,4" by Aris Ariwatan	undisclosed	SAFE	N/A
8	Periuk Kera	"Kelentang Kelentong" by Hael Husaini	undisclosed	SAFE	N/A
9	Orkid	"Peronda Jaket Biru" by Wings	undisclosed	SAFE	N/A
10	Si Merak	"Temberang" by Ayda Jebat	undisclosed	SAFE	N/A
11	Teh Tarik Kaw	"Keindahan Pantai" by M Shariff	undisclosed	RISK	N/A
12	Pepatung	"Perawan Atau Janda" by Cita Citata	undisclosed	RISK	N/A
13	Nanas	"Dekat Padamu" by Yusry KRU	Keifli Othman	OUT	N/A

=== Week 3 (11 February 2022) ===
Performances based on ranking
#	Stage name	Song	Identity	Result	Marks %
1	Burung Hantu	"Haa Tepok" by Meerfly ft MK K-Clique & Kidd Santhe	undisclosed	WIN	N/A
2	Rambutan	"Levitating" by Dua Lipa	undisclosed	SAFE	N/A
3	Bujang Senang	"Satu Peluang" by Andi Bernadee	undisclosed	SAFE	N/A
4	Aiskrim Roti	"Kamelia" by Sweet Charity	undisclosed	SAFE	N/A
5	Periuk Kera	"Stay" by Justin Bieber & The Kid Laroi	undisclosed	SAFE	N/A
6	Mat Penyu	"Siti Bilang Cuti" by Danial Zaini	undisclosed	SAFE	N/A
7	Si Merak	"Tak Tercapai Akalmu" by Elyana	undisclosed	SAFE	N/A
8	Seladang	"Kau Pun Sama" by Syamel	undisclosed	SAFE	N/A
9	Ratu Semut	"Hey Ladies" by Rossa	undisclosed	SAFE	N/A
10	Orkid	"Canggung" by Wany Hasrita	undisclosed	RISK	N/A
11	Teh Tarik Kaw	"Zalikha" by Floor 88	undisclosed	RISK	N/A
12	Pepatung	"Layar Impian" by Ella	Datin Seri Maria Farida	OUT	N/A

=== Week 4 (18 February 2022) ===
Performances based on ranking
#	Stage name	Song	Identity	Result	Marks %
1	Burung Hantu	"Standing In The Eyes of The World" by Ella	undisclosed	WIN	N/A
2	Bujang Senang	"Peluang Kedua" by Nabila Razali	undisclosed	SAFE	N/A
3	Rambutan	"Teman" by Iman Troye	undisclosed	SAFE	N/A
4	Si Merak	"Cobalah Untuk Setia" by Kris Dayanti	undisclosed	SAFE	N/A
5	Seladang	"24K Magic" by Bruno Mars	undisclosed	SAFE	N/A
6	Periuk Kera	"Hang Pi Mana" by Khalifah Band	undisclosed	SAFE	N/A
7	Aiskrim Roti	"Senggol Senggolan, Cubit Cubitan" by Mas Idayu	undisclosed	SAFE	N/A
8	Ratu Semut	"Intan Payung" by Bunga ft Noraniza Idris	undisclosed	SAFE	N/A
9	Orkid	"Dynamite" by BTS	undisclosed	RISK	N/A
10	Mat Penyu	"Ada" by Dato' M Nasir	undisclosed	RISK	N/A
11	Teh Tarik Kaw	"Hati Emas" by Kembara	Sazali Samad	OUT	N/A

=== Week 5 (25 February 2022) ===
Performances based on ranking
#	Stage name	Song	Identity	Result	Marks %
1	Orkid	"Semalam" by Aina Abdul	undisclosed	WIN	93.67
2	Rambutan	"Kasihnya Laila" by Jinbara	undisclosed	SAFE	93.67
3	Seladang	"Bangun" by Aman RA	undisclosed	SAFE	92.11
4	Burung Hantu	"Bad Romance" by Lady Gaga	undisclosed	SAFE	89.33
5	Mat Penyu	"Arjuna" by Dewa 19	undisclosed	SAFE	88.00
6	Bujang Senang	"Lemas" by Ruffedge	undisclosed	SAFE	86.22
7	Si Merak	"GIG" by Kumpulan Elite	undisclosed	SAFE	85.89
8	Ratu Semut	"Chikadun" by Floor 88	undisclosed	RISK	84.56
9	Periuk Kera	"Kisah Antara Kita" by One Avenue Band	undisclosed	RISK	81.89
10	Aiskrim Roti	"Assalamualaikum" by Faizal Tahir	Iman Troye	OUT	71.11

=== Week 6 (4 March 2022) ===
Performances based on ranking
#	Stage name	Song	Identity	Result	Marks %
1	Rambutan	"Curiga" by Ning Baizura	undisclosed	WIN	N/A
2	Burung Hantu	"Beribu Sesalan" by 3 Suara	undisclosed	SAFE	N/A
3	Seladang	"Ku Tak Akan Bersuara" by Nike Ardilla	undisclosed	SAFE	N/A
4	Periuk Kera	"Hijau" by Zainal Abidin	undisclosed	SAFE	N/A
5	Si Merak	"Menaruh Harapan" by Zaiton Sameon	undisclosed	SAFE	N/A
6	Orkid	"Goyang Inul" by Inul Daratista	undisclosed	SAFE	N/A
7	Bujang Senang	"Ghazal Untuk Rabiah" by Jamal Abdillah ft M. Nasir	undisclosed	RISK	N/A
8	Ratu Semut	"Nang" by Iman Troye	undisclosed	RISK	N/A
9	Mat Penyu	"Karam" by Zabarjad	Zul Huzaimy	OUT	N/A

=== Week 7 (11 March 2022) ===
Performances based on ranking
#	Stage name	Song	Identity	Result	Marks %
1	Orkid	"Easy on Me" by Adele	undisclosed	WIN	N/A
2	Rambutan	"Jangan Kau Mimpi" by Siti Sarah	undisclosed	SAFE	N/A
3	Ratu Semut	"Bang Bang" by Ariana Grande, Jessie J, Nicki Minaj	undisclosed	SAFE	N/A
4	Burung Hantu	"Set Fire to the Rain" by Adele	undisclosed	SAFE	N/A
5	Seladang	"Ragaman" by Faizal Tahir	undisclosed	SAFE	N/A
6	Bujang Senang	"Mewangi" by Akim & The Majistret	undisclosed	RISK	N/A
7	Si Merak	"Kalau Mencari Teman" by Ziana Zain	undisclosed	RISK	N/A
8	Periuk Kera	"Tanya Sama Itu Hud Hud" by M. Nasir	Resh	OUT	N/A

=== Week 8 (18 March 2022) ===
Performances based on ranking
#	Stage name	Song	Identity	Result	Marks %
1	Seladang	"Jangan Khianati Aku" by Azlan & The Typewriter	undisclosed	WIN	N/A
2	Orkid	"Nakal" by Gigi	undisclosed	SAFE	N/A
3	Burung Hantu	"Sandiwara" by Xpose	undisclosed	SAFE	N/A
4	Rambutan	"Revolusi" by Bunkface	undisclosed	SAFE	N/A
5	Si Merak	"Sweet Child o' Mine" by Guns N' Roses	undisclosed	RISK	N/A
6	Ratu Semut	"Anggapanmu" by Ziana Zain	undisclosed	RISK	N/A
7	Bujang Senang	"Bukan Cinta Biasa" by Afgan	Sabhi Saddi	OUT	N/A

=== Week 9 (25 March 2022) ===
Performances based on ranking
#	Stage name	Song	Identity	Result	Marks %
1	Rambutan	"Belum Siap Kehilangan" by Steven Pasaribu	undisclosed	WIN	N/A
2	Orkid	"Sampai Bila" by Misha Omar	undisclosed	SAFE	N/A
3	Seladang	"Aku Rindu Sayang Kamu" by Black Hanifah	undisclosed	SAFE	N/A
4	Burung Hantu	"Hanya Satu" by Datuk Nora	undisclosed	RISK	N/A
5	Ratu Semut	"Tak Ada Logika" by Agnes Monica	undisclosed	RISK	N/A
6	Si Merak	"Cinta Dalam Hati" by Ungu	Sherry Ibrahim	OUT	N/A

Duet performances
#	Singers	Song
1	Ratu Semut & Si Merak	"Beggin'" by Maneskin
2	Orkid & Seladang	"7 Nasihat" by Siti Nurhaliza, Kmy Kmo & Luca Sickta
3	Rambutan & Burung Hantu	"Kill This Love" by Blackpink

=== Week 10 (1 April 2022) ===
Performances based on ranking
#	Stage name	Song	Identity	Result	Marks %
1	Rambutan	^{1st round:} "Bujang Senang" by Wings^{2nd round:} "Hurt" by Christina Aguilera	Shila Amzah	WINNER	N/A
2	Seladang	^{1st round:} "Stereotype" by Akim & The Majistret^{2nd round:} "Madah Berhelah" by Ziana Zain	Amir Masdi	RUNNER-UP	N/A
3	Orkid	^{1st round:} "Pudar" by Indah Ruhaila^{2nd round:} "Rolling in the Deep" by Adele	Liza Hanim	THIRD	N/A
4	Burung Hantu	^{1st round:} "Fantasia Bulan Madu" by Search^{2nd round:} "Bukan Cinta Biasa" by Dato' Sri Siti Nurhaliza + "Bring Me to Life" by Evanescence	Hannah Delisha	FINALIST	N/A
5	Ratu Semut	^{1st round:} "Seragam Hitam" by Kristal^{2nd round:} "Karena Ku Sanggup" by Agnes Monica	Ara Johari	FINALIST	N/A

== See also ==
- The Masked Singer Malaysia
- The Masked Singer Malaysia (season 1)
- Masked Singer
- Astro Warna
- Akademi Fantasia
- I Can See Your Voice Malaysia
