= The Masked Singer Malaysia =

Malaysian singing competition television show

- Genre: Reality competition
- Based on: King of Mask Singer by MBC
- Presented by: Dato' AC Mizal
- Opening theme: Siapakah Dirimu? (Who Are You?)
- Composers: Shah Slam (music director); Altimet; Cuurley
- Country of origin: Malaysia
- Original language: Malay
- No. of seasons: 4 (Official Series); 2 (Reunion Raya Series)
- No. of episodes: 39 (Official Series); 2 (Reunion Raya Series)

Production
- Producers: Khairul Anwar Ibrahim; Najib Amin
- Production locations: Shah Alam Royale Theatre (Royal Teater Shah Alam) (TMSMY 1); Putrajaya International Convention Centre (Pusat Konvensyen Antarabangsa Putrajaya) (Reunion Raya, TMSMY 2 and TMSMY 3); CIDB Conversation Centre, Kuala Lumpur (Pusat Konvensyen CIDB Kuala Lumpur) ( TMSMY 4)
- Production company: MEASAT Broadcast Network Systems Sdn Bhd

Original release
- Network: Astro Warna
- Release: 18 September 2020 – 18 February 2024

Related
- The Masked Singer Malaysia Reunion

The Masked Singer Malaysia (or abbreviation TMSMY) is a Malaysian mystery and reality music show based on the Masked Singer franchise which originated from the South Korean television program King of Mask Singer. The program aired its first season in September 2020, on Astro Warna and hosted by AC Mizal. The First season (TMSMY 1) has been aired on Astro Warna at 21:00 (Prime Time Malaysia) every Friday with a total of eight episodes from 18 September until 6 November 2020. The Second season (TMSMY 2) started airing from 28 January, to 1 April 2022. A Third Season (TMSMY 3) premiered in 23 December 2022, to 3 March 2023. The Fourth Season (TMSMY 4) is first live in Asia and second in the world after Germany from 17 December 2023, to 18 February 2024.

== Host and panelist ==
The host and panelist for The Masked Singer Malaysia were revealed on the official press conference on 8 September 2020. The host for The Masked Singer Malaysia is the nation's well known entertainer, Dato' AC Mizal. The panelist consisting of nine popular local celebrities who played role as permanent jury. Prior to the airing of its first episode, ten posters of the host and panelist with hidden faces were published by ASTRO as a teaser for the program.

== Concept ==
Twelve contestants who are well-known figures from various backgrounds, such as singers, actors, hosts, athletes and more, will be vying for the top spot by charming the audience and jury with just their voices. They will be judged by a panel of jury made up of popular local celebrities. To further keep the contestants' identities top secret, only eight members of the production team have been entrusted with their true identities. Every week, before each performance, a video clip will be revealed to the audience as a clue for the identity of each contestant. After each performance, the jury members are required to make a guess and name 3 celebrities who are most likely to be the identity behind the masked singer. In the end of the show, one contestant with the lowest rank will be eliminated based on the marks percentage given by the panelist. His or her face will then be revealed for the first time. The only contestant to remain masked until the final elimination round will be named the first champion of "The Masked Singer Malaysia". The show, which is taped weekly with a live audience at Royal Theatre, Shah Alam, is held on a smaller scale than usual. The number of audience members is limited in compliance with current social distancing procedures.

== Costume design ==
All contestants are wearing costumes that cover them from head to toe, completely obscuring their identities. The costume design was revealed on the official press conference on 8 September 2020. The costume design for the first season is created and prepared by Akma Suriati Awang. They are inspired and based on Malaysian culture including ABC (Malaysian shaved ice dessert), Ayam Jantan (rooster or adult male chicken), Bunga Raya (Malaysia's national flower), Rajah Brooke (butterfly from rainforest), Enggang (hornbills mostly found in Sarawak), Musang King (popular variety of Durian, king of fruits), Nasi Lemak (Malaysia's national food), Orang Utan (native mammal from Borneo and Sumatra), Rafflesia (biggest flower in Malaysia), Reno (rhinoceros which can be found in Southern Asia), Rimau (Malayan tiger), and Wau (traditional moon-kite game from Kelantan). For second season, Akma Suriati collaborated with Hatta Dolmat for the costume design. The 14 characters are Bujang Senang, Nanas, Mat Penyu, Seladang, Teh Tarik Kaw, Harum Manis, Periuk Kera, Aiskrim Roti, Rambutan, Ratu Semut, Orkid, Si Merak, Burung Hantu and Pepatung.

== Season overview ==
=== Original series ===
Season	Numbers of member list	Numbers of week	Official Broadcast		WINNER	RUNNER-UP
Season	Numbers of member list	Numbers of week	First Broadcast	Last Broadcast	WINNER	RUNNER-UP
1	12	8	18 September 2020	6 November 2020	Aina Abdul as Bunga Raya	Vanessa Reynauld as Rajah Brooke
2	14	10	28 January 2022	1 April 2022	Shila Amzah as Rambutan	Amir Masdi as Seladang
3	15	11	23 December 2022	3 March 2023	Ayda Jebat as Betta Fish	Syamel as Nyoq Muda
4	15	10	17 December 2023	18 February 2024	Stacy Anam as Bunga Matahari	Namie Smy as Mat Helang

=== Host / Panelists overview ===
Host
Live + Host
Panelists
Invitation panel

Celebrity	Season			
Celebrity	1	2	3	4
AC Mizal	Host			
Izzue Islam	Live + Host			
Elly Ariffin	Live + Host			
Ella	Panelists			
Aznil Nawawi	Panelists			Panelists
Zizan Razak	Panelists			Panelists
Michael Ang	Panelists			Panelists
Angah Iskandarsah	Panelists			Panelists
Remy Ishak	Panelists			
Ramona Zamzam	Panelists			
Raja Azura	Panelists			
Remy Ishak	Panelists			
Nabila Huda	Panelists			Panelists
Mark Adam	Repeat panel			
Janna Nick	Repeat panel			
Anna Aljuffrey		Live+ Host		
Amy Mastura		Panelists		
Sharnaaz Ahmad		Repeat panel	Panelists	
Emma Maembong		Repeat panel	Panelists	
Elly Mazlein			Panelists	
Misha Omar			Panelists	
Zul Ariffin			Panelists	
Shuib Sepahtu			Panelists	
Atu Zero			Panelists	
Didie Alias			Panelists	
Erra Fazira			Repeat panel	Panelists
Rozita Che Wan				Panelists
Sherry Alhadad				Panelists
Fattah Amin				Repeat panel
Fiza Frizzy				Live+ Host

=== Reunion Raya Series ===
See in The Masked Singer Malaysia Reunion.

== Reception ==
=== Awards and nominations ===
Awards and nominations
Award	Year	Category	Result	Ref
Content Asia Awards	2021	Best TV Format Adaptation (Non-scripted)	Won	

== See also ==
- The Masked Singer Malaysia (season 1)
- The Masked Singer Malaysia (season 2)
- The Masked Singer Malaysia (season 3)
- The Masked Singer Malaysia (season 4)
- Masked Singer
- Astro Warna
- Akademi Fantasia
- I Can See Your Voice Malaysia
