= Azree Tuju =

Malaysian singer and rapper (born 1996)

Mohd Azree Shah
- Born: Mohd Azree Shah bin Awang Zamree; April 23, 1996 (age 30); Papar, Sabah, Malaysia
- Occupation: Singer
- Years active: 2014–present

Mohd Azree Shah Awang Zamree, also known as Tuju K-Clique or Azree Tuju (born 23 April 1996) is Malaysian singer and rapper. He is known as the founder of Malaysian hip-hop group from Sabah, K-Clique.

== Early life ==
He was born on 23 April 1996, in Kampung Buang Sayang, Papar, Sabah. He is the eldest of three siblings. Tuju is descended from Bruneian Malay.

After finishing his study, Tuju went to Politeknik Kota Kinabalu (PKK). For a while, he worked as n attendant in an auto washer to support his family and study.

== Career ==
=== K-Clique ===
While in University, Tuju showed his passion for rap and hip-hop culture. He found K-Clique with MK and Noki in 2014. Later Somean, KDeaf, FareedPF, Gnello dan NastyNas joined the musical troupe. All of who are native that came from around the part of Sabah. They reached commercial success after the song titled "Mimpi" in 2019.

=== TujuLoca ===
Tuju formed a duo with his wife, Loca B. They released 3 song titled: "Naluri", "Empati" and "Bintang", named after the birth of their son.

=== Solo singer ===
Outside K-Clique, Tuju has performed in many musical performances including his duo with Naim Daniel. On 19 February 2021, he released his independent single, "Jiwa Pusing". After leaving his group, K-Clique on 2022, Tuju released "Kissboy". He later released "Aku Ingin" in September 2024. In February 2025, he released trio single "Gemetar Rentak Jiwa" alongside his fellow rapper, Ghidd and Aphipapol.

=== Other appearances ===
Tuju brieafly appeared as 1 of 50 jury in All Together Now Malaysia, broadcast by Astro Ria. He also won the third place as Malaysian Newcomer Singer in the first season of The Masked Singer Malaysia.

== Personal life ==
Tuju married his fellow singer, Loca B in March 2021. Their first born child was born in 2022 named Bintang Aiko.
