= Loca B =

Malaysian rapper (born 1992)

- Born: Nabilah Hani binti Azali; 28 May 1992 (age 33); Malaysia
- Occupation: Rapper
- Years active: 2018–present

Nabilah Hani binti Azali (born 28 May 1992), known professionally as Loca B, is Malaysian rapper. She received widespread prominence alongside K-Clique member Noki in the song "Gila" by Kaka Azraff.

== Career ==
Initially, Loca B's family did not approve of her involvement in music, but she was able to prove to her family that the music industry could take her further.

Loca B is best known for her collaboration with Noki K-Clique in the song "Gila" sung by Kaka Azraff. This song won the 35th Anugerah Juara Lagu (AJL35) trophy, making Loca B the first Malaysian female rapper to win the AJL trophy.

Loca B formed a duo with her husband, Azree Tuju. They released 3 songs entitled: "Naluri", "Empati" and "Bintang", named after the birth of their son.

== Artistry ==
Loca B is known for highlighting hip-hop with her fluency in rapping. Among her musical influences is Siti Nurhaliza, who she greatly admires.

== Personal life ==
Loca B studied at the University of Southampton. She married fellow K-Clique member Azree Tuju in March 2021. Their first born child was born in 2022. Loca B also has a son from her previous marriage.

In her Instagram post, Loca B admitted she had turned off notifications on social media because she wanted peace.

== Discography ==
=== Singles ===
==== As lead artist ====
Title	Year
"Dendam Wanita"	2019
"Tak Keysah" (duet with Kayda Aziz and Bubu Natassia)	2019
"Cinta 3 Pagi"	2019
"Permaisuri" (duet with Nina Nadira)	2020

==== As featured artist ====
Title	Year
"Mahal" (Charis Ow feat. Loca B)	2019
"Cute (Stop Lah Being So Cute)" (Harith Zazman feat. Loca B)	2020
"Gila" (Kaka Azraff feat. Loca B and Noki)	2020
