= Raja Azura =

Malaysian actress (born 1972)

Raja Azura Tengku Ahmad Tajudin
- Born: 18 August 1972 (age 54); Klang, Selangor, Malaysia
- Other names: Kak Engku, K.E
- Occupations: Actor; Comedian; Host Television; Singer; Entertainer; Radio Presenter
- Years active: 1990–present
- Spouse: Adzmin Osman (m. 2001; div. 2010)
- Children: 3

Raja Azura binti Tengku Ahmad Tajudin (born 18 August 1972) better known as Raja Azura or Kak Engku (K.E) is an actress, singer, comedian, host, entertainer and radio presenter in Malaysia. Kak Engku has won the Anugerah Bintang Popular Berita Harian (ABPBH) Popular Female TV Presenter trophy twice, and the ABPBH Popular Female TV Actress trophy once.

== Personal life ==
In March 2001, Azura married Adzmin Osman, the son of former Kedah Chief Minister, Osman Bin Haji Aroff. They have 3 children.

On 6 August 2010, Azura met with a counseling officer at the Syariah Subordinate Court File, Shah Alam.

== Discography ==
- ...Dan Bunga Bergururan (1998)
- Raja Azura (2008)

== Filmography ==
=== Films ===
Year	Title	Character	Notes
1990	Riang Tirana	Milah	First film
1991	Demi Cinta Belahlah Dadaku		
1991	Juara	Salbiah	
1993	Pemburu Bayang	Ruby	
1995	Jimi Asmara	Sabariah	
1995	Debu-Debu Cinta	Linda	
1996	Lurah Dendam	Sharifah	
1997	Ghazal Untuk Rabiah	Sheila	
2001	Putih	red (voice)	
2002	Cinta 200 Ela	Wati	
2005	Pontianak Harum Sundal Malam II	Residents of Village II	Special appearance
2010	Magika	Aunt Andeh	
2021	Salina		Special appearance
2022	Tiga Janda Melawan Dunia	Ani	

=== Drama ===
Year	Title	Character	TV Channel	Notes
1994	Pendekar Kundur		TV1	First drama
1994	Hati Waja	Mona	TV1	
1998–2002	Mat Despatch	Elaina Johari / Puteh	TV1	
2000	Mat Burger		TV1	
2017	Jojie Gigil	Joyah	TV3	
2018	Operazero		Astro Warna	
2019	Cerita Dalam Kain		Astro Prima	
2020	Jujurlah Nikahi Aku	Puan Azah	Astro Ria	
2020	Bidadari Kirimaan Tuhan	Fiza	Astro Ria	
2020	Ryan Aralyn	Ruby	TV3	
2021	Marry Me Senorita	Mak Long	Astro Ria	
2021	Ramadan Pertama Edi	Ustazah Muna	Astro Ria	
2021	Oh My Hantaran	Datin Amy	TV9	
2023	Scammer Geng Marhaban	Puan Toh Jaja Marjuni	Astro Ria	Special appearance
2023	Jack Yusof	Rakmama	Astro Ria	
2023	Cik PA Tuan Ash	Puan Diana	TV3	
2023	Tanah Kubur (Season 16)	Murni	Astro Oasis	Episode: "Harta Faraid"
2024	Malang Si Puteri	Cik Odah	Astro Ria	
2024	Iskandar Chempaka	Naemah	TV3	

=== Telefilm ===
Year	Title	Character	TV Channel
1994	Pengantin Popular		
2002	Pondok Buruk	Som	Astro Ria
2003	Pondok Buruk 2	Som	Astro Ria
2005	Bahulu Hangus		Astro Ria
2006	Takbir Suci	Nora	Astro Ria
2007	Suara Saleha	Radiah	TV3
2008	Hitamnya Hati	Norma	TV3
2008	Takbir Suci 2	Nora	Astro Ria
2010	Takbir Suci 3	Nora	Astro Ria
2016	Mat Despatch Raya Sakan	Elaina Johari / Puteh	TV2
2017	Ramadan Ini Miling Sipa	Rosmi	TV9
2017	Cinta Bersegi-segi	Piah	TV9
2017	Fatonah Azali		TV3
2018	Wish List Raya	Nabila	TV9
2020	Cik Petir Putrajaya		TV3
2022	Terbuka Pintu Syurga	Khatijah	Astro Prima
2023	Nur Di Pintu Syurga		TV9
2023	Quran Pondok Buruk	Som	Astro Ria

=== Television ===
- Melodi (1999 - 2003) TV3
- ABPBH 2000 (2000) TV1
- ABPBH 2002 (2002) TV3
- Destination of Taste with Shell Gas (2005) TV3
- ABPBH 2005 (2006) TV3
- ABPBH 2006 (2007) TV3
- 11th Screen Awards (2007) TV3
- Gedik Santai (2007) TV3
- ABPBH 2007 (2008) TV3
- Ewah Ewah (2009) TV3
- ABPBH 2009 (2010) TV3
- ABPBH 2010 (2011) TV3
- Kilauan Emas (2011 - 2015) Astro Prima
- ABPBH 2011 (2012) TV3
- Tiada Lama Tiada Baharu (2012) TV1
- Primadona (2012 - 2015) Astro Prima
- Betul ke Bohong? (Season 4) (2013) Astro Warna
- Raja Pantun (2015) Astro Prima
- Kilauan Emas Otai (2016) Astro Prima
- Kuali Anak Felda (2017) Astro Prima
- Gegar Vaganza (season 4) (2017)
- Perang Jantina (2017) Astro Ria
- Konsert Mestika D' Klasik 2 Dekad (2018) TV2
- Dimensi Legenda (2018) TV1
- Mingguan Wanita (Season 2) (2019) Astro Prima - Hos Jemputan
- Mingguan Wanita (Season 3) (2020) Astro Prima
- Ceria Megastar Season 2 (2020) Astro Ceria
- Raya Style Kite (2020) TV2
- The Masked Singer Malaysia (season 1) (2020) Astro Warna
- The Masked Singer Malaysia Reunion Raya 2020 (2020) Astro Warna
- Raja Goreng Sampai Hangit (2021) Astro Warna
- Pung Pang Rizalman Raya (2021) Astro Ria
- The Masked Singer Malaysia (season 2) (2022) Astro Warna
- Cerita Rasa Anis Nabilah (2022) TV1
- Otai Can Do It! (2022) Astro Warna
- Tembakan Syawal Bunda Hetty (2022) Astro Ria
- The Masked Singer Malaysia Reunion Raya 2022 (2022) Astro Warna
- Master In The House Malaysia Raya 2022 (2022) TV3
- Borak Lejen (2023) TV2

=== Theatre performance ===
- Sinbad (2008)
- Bidasari (2014)

=== Participants ===
- Maharaja Lawak Mega 2013 Kerusi Panas (2013) (Keross Group) Astro Warna

== Radiography ==
=== Radio ===
Year	Title	Station
2007 – 27 November 2015	Sinar Pagi	Sinar

== Videography ==
=== Video music ===
Year	Singer	Title	Ref
2022	Norman Judge	"Mi Amor"	
2022	Ridzuwan Jusoh & Raja Azura	"Vape Fenomena"	

== Awards and nominations ==
Malaysian Film Festival (FFM)
Year	Category	Decision
1997	Best Supporting Actress	Nominated

Screen Award (ASK)
Year	Category	Results
2008	Best Supporting Actress in a Drama	Nominated

Daily News Popular Star Award (ABPBH)
Year	Category	Results
1994	Popular Female TV Actress	Won
1995	Popular Female TV Actress	Nominated
1996	Popular Female TV Actress	Nominated
2000	Popular Female TV Actress	Nominated
2001	Popular Female TV Host	Nominated
2002	Popular Female TV Host	Won
2003	Popular Female TV Host	Nominated
2005	Popular Female TV Host	Won
2006	Popular Female TV Host	Nominated
2007	Popular Female Comedian	Nominated
2008	Popular Female Comedian	Nominated
2010	Popular Female TV Host	Nominated
2011	Popular Female Comedian Popular Female TV Host Popular Female Radio Host	Nominated
2012	Popular Female TV Host Popular Female Radio Host	Nominated
2013	Popular Female Radio Host	Nominated
2024	Popular TV Host	Nominated

Asian Brand Awards
Year	Category	Results
2016	Most Trusted Radio Presenter	Won
2020	Most Trusted Radio Presenter	Won
