= Noki K-Clique =

- Born: Ahmad Ikhwan bin Aji; July 17, 1994 (age 32); Kota Kinabalu, Sabah, Malaysia
- Other name: Ikhwan Lee
- Occupations: Singer, actor
- Years active: 2012–present
- Musical career
- Genres: Hip Hop, Underground, Mainstream
- Instrument: Vocal
- Label: Black Hat Cat Records

Ahmad Ikhwan bin Aji (born 17 July 1994), known by his musical group name Noki K-Clique, is a hip hop singer and actor from Kota Kinabalu, Sabah. He is known as Safwan in Soloz: Game of Life.

== Career ==
Noki started his career as a musician in the series, Showdown Season Three in 2012. On that show, Noki and his acquaintances performed urban dance. At that time, he joined an urban dancing group called Kitta Move. In 2014, he appeared on Astro national channel for an interview, and later on he formed the rap band K-Clique with MK and Tuju.

Finding success with his new formed group, K-Clique was nominated for Best Southeast Asian Act category on MTV Europe 2020. His most famous own solo single are titled "Gila", also sang by Kaka Azraff and Loca B. In 2025, Noki appeared on the popular Malaysian biographical film, Soloz: Game of Life as Safwan. In that film, Noki wrote and performed a techno song with Hun Haqeem titled "Untuk Semua Jiwa".

== Personal life ==
Noki was born in Kota Kinabalu, Sabah on 17 July 1994. His father is a Malay of Kedayan descent from the southern district of Sipitang, whilst his mother is an ethnic Orang Sungai, a sub-ethnic group of the indigenous Kadazan-Dusun race hailing from Beluran District in the east coast Sandakan Division.
