= Jang Han-byul =

South Korean entertainer (born 1990)

Jang Hanbyul
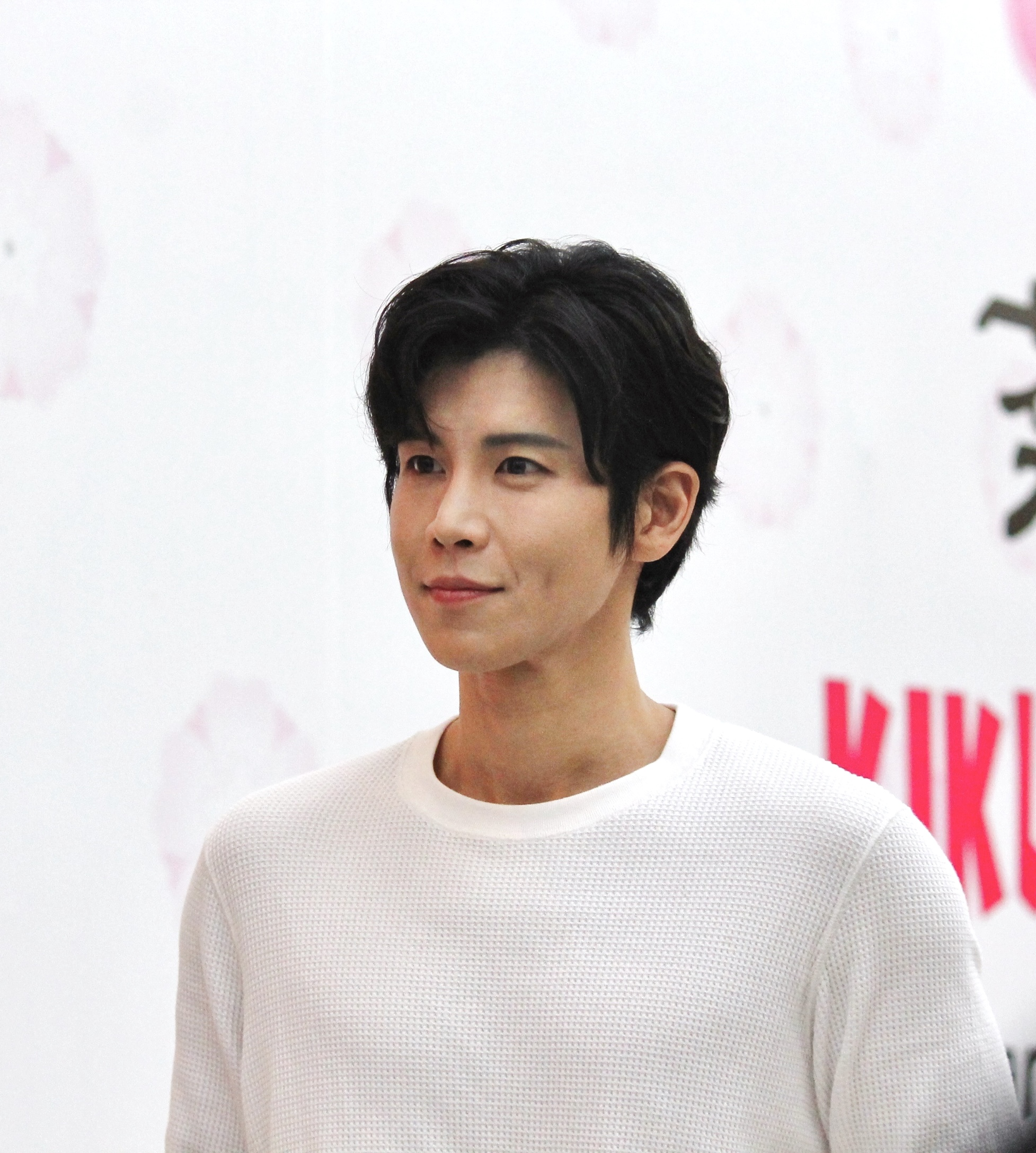
- Jang in 2022
- Born: Jason Jang Han-byul; 4 July 1990 (age 36); Brisbane, Queensland, Australia
- Occupations: Singer; actor; producer; television personality
- Musical career
- Genre: K-pop
- Instruments: Vocals; guitar; keyboard; saxophone
- Years active: 2011–present
- Labels: The Groove Entertainment; Universal Music Japan; Warner Music; Sony Music Korea

Korean name
- Hangul: 장한별
- RR: Jang Hanbyeol
- MR: Chang Hanbyŏl

Jang Han-byul (Korean: 장한별; born 4 July 1990) is a South Korean singer, actor, producer and television personality based in South Korea. He was the host of After School Club along with co-host, Eric Nam and has appeared on the Code: Secret Room and Society Game. He is the former lead vocalist of Led Apple and made his official debut with mini-album CODA in November 2011. His YouTube channel reached almost 1 million subscribers but was deleted in 2015 following a legal dispute with his previous label.

== Early life and education ==
Jang was born in Brisbane, Queensland, to South Korean parents. Since he was five years old, Jang had a passion for musical instruments and took private piano, violin, and saxophone lessons during his childhood before growing an interest for singing.Despite his musical talent, Jang's dream was to become a professional football or basketball player at a young age. As a teenager, his parents aspired for Jang to become a golf player because of his athletic abilities but lost his passion for the game after a few years.

Jang attended Brisbane Grammar School. He was a regular of both the football and basketball first teams during his time at Brisbane Grammar. Jang was an all-round A student but particularly excelled in mathematics where he was a regular member of the school Olympiad team as well as dux of Mathematics during his graduating years. He graduated with an OP1, the highest possible academic rank achievable, which made Jang eligible to study any course he wished in university.

Jang was accepted into the School of Dentistry at Monash University, the University of Melbourne and the University of Sydney but chose to study Dental Science at the University of Queensland, in order to stay closer to his parents. Jang admitted in an interview with eNEWS24 that he studied dentistry after being given an ultimatum by his parents that they would allow him to go to Korea to audition to become a singer, only if he had a financially secure option aligned for his future. He deferred after his second year of dentistry to pursue music in Korea after receiving overwhelming interest for his talent from major music labels.

Jang is multilingual, having studied languages during high school and throughout his career. He is fluent in Korean, English, Japanese, French, Latin, Chinese and Malay.

== Career ==
Jang started his musical career as a trainee at various major Korean music labels for 2 years, including the same agency as IU at Loen Entertainment, before making his debut as the frontman of the K-pop band, Led Apple. While he was with the band, Jang found international success with his Music Note song covers on his YouTube channel, most of his covers reaching millions of views. His channel reached almost 1 million subscribers but was deleted in 2015 following a legal dispute with his previous label.

He was a prominent host of many Korean television talk-shows and music programs and rose to worldwide fame among K-pop fans as the host of After School Club alongside co-host, Eric Nam, interviewing global K-pop groups such as BTS, EXO and Miss A. Largely due to Jang's global popularity, Led Apple embarked on several international and European tours. In Japan, Led Apple found huge success selling out concerts in Tokyo and Osaka for several years. Their Japanese debut album, Kiss Tour, debuted at number 12 on the Oricon Album Charts. Their second Japanese album charted in at number 9 on the Top 10 Oricon Album Charts and the album's single, "Greatest World", reached number 10 on the Oricon Singles Charts.

In 2011, Jang's band Led Apple was named one of the most anticipated K-pop acts of 2011 by WaveK. In 2012, Jang was named one of the best vocalists in K-pop as well as one of the most beautiful faces in K-pop in the same year. Led Apple was also awarded best new artist at the 20th Korean Culture Entertainment Awards in this year.

He appeared on several episodes of Immortal Songs: Singing the Legend from 2012 to 2013, receiving standing ovations for his unique renditions of original songs and became well known as a powerful and versatile vocalist often being compared to Lee Hong-gi of F.T. Island. His rendition of "Invisible Love" by Shin Seung-hun was particularly praised.

In 2015, Jang left the band due to mistreatment from his previous label and went on to pursue a solo career. In addition to his singing and acting career, he has also worked as a songwriter and vocal trainer for other K-pop artists.

His solo soundtrack "Winter Wind" for the South Korean drama, Remember, reached the Top 10 QQ Music Charts in China in 2016.

in 2019, Jang participated in a popular Malaysian singing reality competition television series, Big Stage Season 2 and made history by becoming the first and only champion from a foreign country in Malaysian reality television to date.

He was awarded "Best New Artist" at the 2020 MeleTOP Era Awards in his first year in Malaysia but could not attend the award ceremony because he was residing in South Korea due to the COVID-19 pandemic.

Jang was a contestant on The Masked Singer Malaysia Season 3 as Piza Panas where he finished in third place overall. There was much controversy surrounding the results of the show with many netizens and audience disputing that Jang should have rightfully been the champion of the show. He placed first in six of the 11 weeks of the show including the semi-final, making Jang the only contestant to have won in 6 weeks of competition in the history of The Masked Singer Malaysia.

Jang has been the face and brand ambassador of major brands and products during his career including skin care brand IOPE, hair care house Foresta, fashion house Greedilous, Coway, beverage company Power Root and McDonald's.

Currently, he is active between South Korea and Malaysia.

== Discography ==
=== Singles ===
Title	Year	Peak chart positions	Sales	Album
Title	Year	KOR	Sales	Album
"With Coffee" (with Zia)	2013	33	KOR: 134,529	Non-album singles
"It's Spring" (봄이 왔어요)	2017	—		Non-album singles
"Dumb Love" (뭣 같은 LOVE)	2017	—		Non-album singles
"One A.M." (새벽 한시)	2018	65		Non-album singles
"Luka Dan Bahagia"	2019	1		Big Stage 2019
"Used to This"	2021	—		Non-album singles
"Pesona Kamu"	2022	—		Non-album singles
"Bukan Milikmu"	2022	—		Non-album singles
"Miya" (미야)	2026	125		Non-album singles
"—" denotes a recording that did not chart.

=== Soundtrack appearances ===
Title	Year	Peak chart positions	Sales	Album
Title	Year	KOR	Sales	Album
"I'll Be There for You"	2013	45	KOR: 54,267	7th Grade Civil Servant OST
"Call My Name"	2014	—		Marriage Not Dating OST
"Shooting Star"	2015	—		Cheer Up! OST
"Winter Wind" (겨울바람)	2016	—		Remember OST
"Those Words" (그 말)	2016	—		Blow Breeze OST
"I Love You" (널 사랑해)	2018	—		I Picked Up a Celebrity on the Street OST
"Like a Star" (마음이 별이 되어)	2020	—		Mr. Queen OST
"Retak"	2020	—		Dendam Cinta Arissa OST
"—" denotes a recording that did not chart.

=== Music videos ===
Year	Title	Length	Publisher	Ref.
2018	"One A.M" (새벽 한시)	3:54	1theK (원더케이)	
2021	"Used to This"	3:27	Sony Music Korea	

== Filmography ==
=== Film ===
Year	Title	Role	Notes
2021	Mat Bond Malaya	Agent 5	First Malay movie

=== Television ===
Year	Program	Network	Roles	Notes
2012	Simply Kpop	Arirang TV	himself	host
2012	Lee Seungyeon and 100 Women	Story On	himself	host
2012	Music High	SBS Power FM	himself	host
2012	US M-Countdown	Mnet	himself	host
2013	After School Club	Arirang TV	himself	host
2013	Immortal Songs: Singing the Legend	KBS2	himself	regular contestant
2015	Code: Secret Room	JTBC	himself	contestant
2016	Touch Q	Arirang TV	himself	contestant
2016	Society Game	tvN	himself	contestant
2019	Big Stage (Season 2)	Astro Ria	himself	contestant on Malaysian Reality Show
2020	Dansa Dan Sing	Astro Ria	himself	Guest Judge on Malaysian Reality Show
2020	MeleTOP	Astro Ria	himself	Malaysian talk show
2020	Cuti Baru Nak Up	Astro Ria	himself	Malaysian Travelogue Show EP8
2020	The Cuba Show: Edisi Ramadan	Astro Ria	himself	First Malay television Show for Ramadhan month
2020	Aku Benci Kpop(I Hate Kpop)	Astro Ria	Hyun Jun	First Malay Telemovie
2020	The Cuba Show: Edisi Raya	Astro Ria	Himself	Second Malay television show for Aidilfitri
2021	I Can See Your Voice Malaysia (season 4)	TV3	Himself	Guest on Malaysian Reality Show
2021	Kak Kek Ngajar Oppa Kecek	Astro Ria	Hyun	Main cast
2022	Arena Panas: Pro vs Bro	Astro Warna	Himself	Host
2023	Lecturerku Oppa	iQIYI	Hyun	Lead actor

== Big Stage Season 2 ==
Jang participated in a Malaysian singing reality competition television series, Big Stage Season 2, in 2019 which aired on Astro Ria. In this reality show, Jang used his first name "Han-byul".

Performance:
Week	Theme	Song	Original Artist	Result
Week 1	N/A	"Shooting Star"	Jang Han-byul	SAFE
Week 2	Hype Beat	"Vroom Vroom"	Nabila Razali	SAFE
Week 3	Glocal Hits	"I'll Never Love Again"	Lady Gaga	SAFE
Week 4	Duominasi	"Just Give Me A Reason" (ft. Sarah Suhairi)	Pink & Nate Ruess	SAFE
Week 5	Cannot Brain	"Yang Sedang Sedang saja"	Iwan	SAFE
Week 6	Judge Choice	"Love Someone"	Lukas Graham	SAFE
Week 6	Battle Song	"Bang Bang" (Battle With Neeta)	Jessie J, Ariana Grande and Nicki Minaj	SAFE
Week 7	Road to Final	"Boy with Luv"	BTS ft. Halsey	SAFE
Week 7	Duet	"Dirgahayu" (Duet with Siti Sarah)	Dato' Sri Siti Nurhaliza Ft Faizal Tahir	SAFE
Week 8	Cover Final	"Lose Yourself"	Eminem	WINNER
Week 8	New Single	"Luka Dan Bahagia"	Jang Han-byul	WINNER

He placed first in all weeks of competition except for the first week. He was number 1 on fan voting in all weeks throughout the whole competition with almost 50% of all audience votes going to him. The video of his second week performance, "Vroom Vroom" went viral in Malaysia and made him a household name. His challenging and daring song choices was notable throughout the competition where judges such as Siti Nurhaliza gave standing ovations and praised him for his courageous and hard-working artistry.

In the final concert of Big Stage Season 2, he made history by becoming the first and only champion from a foreign country in Malaysian reality television. His debut Malaysian single "Luka Dan Bahagia" reached number 1 on the Malaysian radio station Era as well as on several other local radio stations.

== The Masked Singer Malaysia Season 3 ==
Jang appeared on The Masked Singer Malaysia Season 3 as the disguised mascot, Piza Panas. He placed first in six of the 11 weeks of competition becoming the only contestant in the history of The Masked Singer Malaysia to accomplish such an achievement. In the final week, he finished in third place overall. There was much controversy surrounding the results of the final week with many of the audience voicing their opinion that Jang should have been the champion of the show. Jang as Piza Panas was number 1 in audience voting in all weeks of competition, making him a fan favourite among netizens for his energetic stage persona and choreographed performances.

Performance as Piza Panas:
Week	Song	Original Artist	Result
Week 1	"It's Gonna Be Me"	NSYNC	WIN
Week 2	"Pelayaran"	May	WIN
Week 3	"Bagaimana Kalau Aku Tidak Baik-Baik Saja"	Judika	WIN
Week 4	"Kau Sakiti"	Amir Masdi	WIN
Week 5	"Highway to Hell"	AC/DC	WIN
Week 6	"Havoc"	Joe Flizzow feat Altimet & SonaOne	5th
Week 7	"Balqis"	Siti Nurhaliza	4th
Week 8	"Sampai Syurga"	Faizal Tahir	2nd
Week 9	"Sudah Ku Tahu"	Projector Band	2nd
Week 10	"Eye of the Tiger"	Survivor	WIN
Week 10	"Gemuruh" (Duet with Nyoq Muda)	Awie feat Amy Search	WIN
Finals	"Hilang Naluri"	Once Mekel	3rd Overall
Finals	"SriKandi Cintaku" (Duet with Amir Masdi)	Bloodshed	3rd Overall

== Awards and nominations ==
Year	Award	Category	Nominated work	Result	Ref.
2012	20th Korean Culture Entertainment Awards	Best New K-pop Artist	Led apple	WON	
2020	2020 MeleTOP Era Awards	Best New Artist	Himself	WON	
