= Sherry Ibrahim =

Malaysian actress, model and television host

- شيري إبراهيم
- Born: Syarizad binti Ibrahim; 3 April 1983 (age 43); Petaling Jaya, Selangor, Malaysia
- Education: Sekolah Menengah Kebangsaan St. Mary, Kuala Lumpur
- Occupations: Actress, model, TV host, flight attendant
- Years active: 2006–present

Syarizad "Sherry" Ibrahim (born 3 April 1983) is a Malaysian actress, model and television host. In 2013, she played the lead character Iffa in the Malaysian series Teduhan Kasih.

== Early life ==
Sherry was born and raised in Petaling Jaya to Ibrahim Yaacob and Norliza Maamun. She has two younger sisters. As a student, Sherry attended St. Mary's Girls' School, Kuala Lumpur. In 2001, she worked as a flight attendant for Malaysia Airlines. She quit when her contract ended in 2006. She debuted in a TV series in TV3, Dunia Baru, under director M. Hitler Zami, followed by various appearances in acting, hosting and commercials. In 2010, she paused her acting career and took a position as a flight attendant for Qatar Airways.

== Career ==
After a break in her artistic career in 2010, she made a comeback in 2012 when her contract with Qatar Airways ended. She was offered a small role in the drama series Setia Hujung Nyawa from episode 16 onwards at TV3 Malaysia. Sherry was then offered one of the lead roles alongside Adi Putra, Nabila Huda and Shah Iskandar in the drama Teduhan Kasih. She is now managed by Afeeq of Laugh Out Loud Entertainment Sdn. Bhd.

== Personal life ==
Sherry Ibrahim was never married.

She had a relationship with the Malaysian actor and model, Ashraf Muslim, until early 2009. In October 2014, it was reported that she was having a relationship with a Malaysian actor and model, Fattah Amin. The couple met last June during the drama series of Cinta Ibadah.

== Filmography ==
=== Film ===
Year	Title	Role	Notes
2009	Maut	Black Metal Kid	
2010	Kapoww!!	Nola	

=== Drama (TV series) ===
Year	Title	Role	TV Channel
2006–2007	Dunia Baru	Emma Zalina	TV3 Season 2 & 3
2007	Cinta Tak Bertepi	–	RTM1
2008–2009	Renjis	Mila	Astro Ria Season 1 & 2
2008	Lara Rindu Mahsuri	Mustika	TV3 & TV9
2009	Cinta Untuk Ain	Zarita	TV3
2009	Biru Cinta De Laguna	–	TV9
2009	Fotocopi	Ain	RTM2
2009	Cik Ah Cik Nin	Nina	Astro Prima
2010	Chapalrela	Puteri	Astro Warna
2012	Setia Hujung Nyawa	Eriza	TV3 from 'Malay Novel by Fatin Nabila'
2013	Teduhan Kasih	Iffa	TV3 from 'Malay novel by Marissa'
2013	Dia Tetap Ayah	Sakinah	Astro Maya HD
2013	Projek Memikat Suami	Adira Sulaiman	Astro Ria
2013	Aku Bukan Superstar	–	RTM
2013	Abadi	–	RTM
2014	Hingga Akhir Nanti	Dr. Maira	RTM
2014–2015	Cinta Ibadah	Dr. Irma	Astro Maya HD (Pre-production) '2nd Season'
2014	Shampoo Girl	Intan 'Guest Artist'	TV3
2015	Keluarga Karaoke	Azura	Astro Mustika HD
2015	Eksperimen Cinta	Seri	TV3 (Pre-production) from 'Malay novel by Anjell'
2016	Gerak Khas	–	TV2
2017–2018	Syurga Yang Kedua	Ellis	Astro Maya HD

=== Telemovie ===
Year	Title	Role	TV Channel
–	Mimi Tapau	–	
2013	Cinta Kapcai	Awin	TV1
2013	Pengancam Perkahwinan	–	Astro Ria
2014	Mata & Hati Pendusta	Azura	Astro Oasis
2014	Janji Qasidah	Qasidah/Anis	TV1
2015	Manisnya Bulan Madu	Ameesha	TV3

=== TV Host ===
Year	Title	TV Channel	Notes
–	Layar Lensa	RTM	
–	Dari Suara Hati	–	
2009	CHOPP!	TV9	
2014	1001 Destinasi Malaysiaku!	Bernama TV 'Astro 502'	Pre-production

=== Music video ===
Year	Song title	Artist / Band	Notes
2005	Itu Kamu (That You)	Estranged	–

=== TV commercials ===
Year	Brand	Product	Notes
2002	McDonald's	Bubur Ayam McD	–
–	Celcom Axiata	Celcom	–
–	Malaysia Tourism	–	–
–	HSBC	0% Interest	–
–	Prefer Shampoo	–	–
–	Telekom Malaysia	TM Net	–
–	Astro	Akademi Fantasia	–
–	Speed Zone	–	–
–	Sunway Group	Sunway Hotel	–
2013	Johnson & Johnson	My Clean & Clear	along with Fiffy Natasya & Hanis Zalikha

== Discography ==
Year	Title	Composer
2015	Hero Untukmu (Feat with Fattah Amin & RJ)	
2016	Seikhlas Cinta	Songs by Hadi Hassan Lyrics by J. Looi

=== Music video ===
Year	Title	Director
2016	Seikhlas Cinta	Bob Husaini
