= Mingguan Wanita =

Malaysian women's magazine

- Categories: Women's magazine
- Frequency: Weekly (1983–2018); Monthly (2018-2020); Online (2021-present)
- First issue: 14 October 1983
- Final issue: December 2020 (print)
- Company: Kumpulan Media Karangkraf Sdn Bhd
- Country: Malaysia
- Based in: Shah Alam
- Language: Malay
- Website: mingguanwanita.my
- ISSN: 1675-039X

Mingguan Wanita (Women's Weekly) was a Malay women's weekly magazine, first published in October 1983. Mingguan Wanita provided articles on women's topics. It was published on a weekly basis from 1983 to 2018, then monthly from 2018 to 2020. The magazine has been fully online since 2021.
