= Ayda Jebat =

Malaysian singer and actress

- عايدة جبت
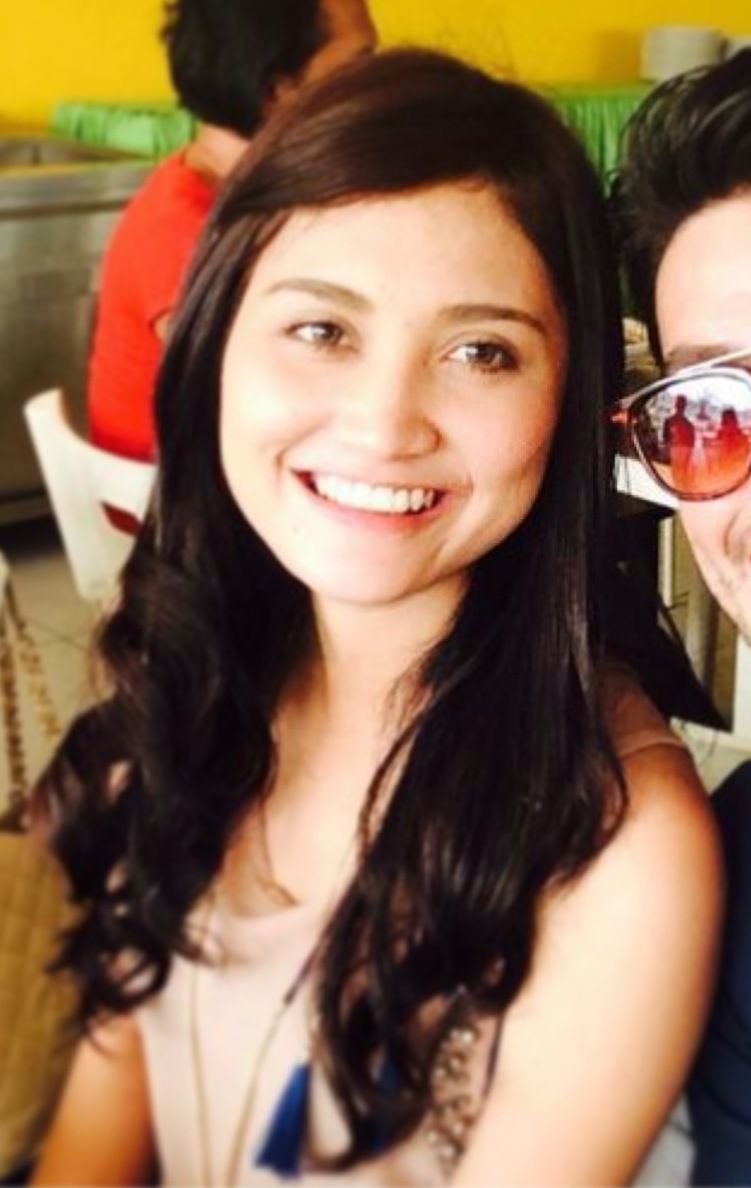
- Ayda on the set of the drama filming Rindu Awak 200%.
- Born: Nur Suhada binti Jebat; 17 March 1992 (age 34); Ayer Keroh, Melaka, Malaysia
- Education: Universiti Teknologi MARA (UiTM)
- Occupations: Singer; actress
- Years active: 2011–present
- Spouse: Nabil Mahir (m. 2021)
- Children: 3
- Musical career
- Genres: Pop; R&B
- Instrument: Vocals
- Labels: Paranormal Talents; Warner Music Malaysia

Nur Suhada binti Jebat (born 17 March 1992), better known by her stage name, Ayda Jebat, is a Malaysian singer and actress. She was a participant of the ninth season of Akademi Fantasia. She became known to many through the drama Rindu Awak 200% (2014). Her film credits include Gila-Gila Remaja 2 (2013) and Pinjamkan Hatiku (2017).

== Early life ==
Born Nur Suhada binti Jebat on 17 March 1992 in Ayer Keroh, Melaka Ayda is the eldest of four siblings. She has two sisters and a brother. One of her younger sisters, Nur Syafinaz "Fyna" Jebat, is a singer and businesswoman. She and her siblings were raised by their mother after their parents' divorce.

== Career ==
=== 2011–2013: Akadmei Fantasia and career beginnings ===
Ayda's career began after joining the Akademi Fantasia reality show for its ninth season where at a curtain concert held on 2 April 2011, she sang the song Separuh Nafas group song Dewa 19 and Love The Way You Lie song Rihanna. Ayda was eliminated through Operation Fall, in the third week. After Akademi Fantasia 9 ended, Ayda recorded her debut single, "Beri Aku Waktu".

Ayda made her acting debut in the telefilm CerCiter Cinta. In 2013, Ayda made her film debut in the sequel to Gila-Gila Remaja, Gila-Gila Remaja 2 as Zetty

=== 2014: Success with Rindu Awak 200% ===
Ayda had a breakout role in 2014 when she played the character of Armel Aisya in the drama adaptation of the novel Rindu Awak 200% opposite Zul Ariffin. The success of the series led her to winning the MeleTOP New Artist Award at Anugerah MeleTOP Era.

=== 2015 – present: Career development ===
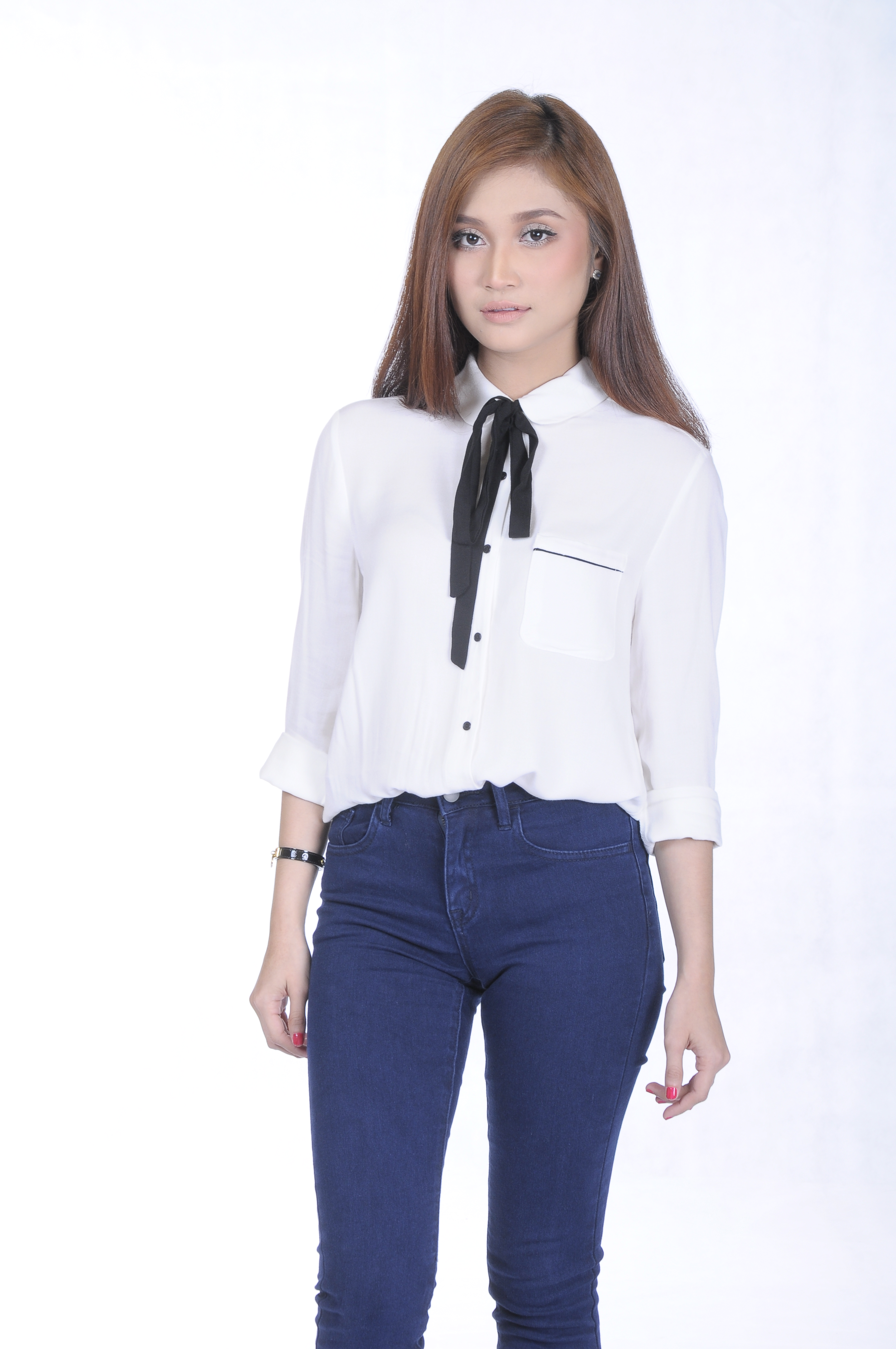
Ayda Jebat during a photography session with Tonton.

In 2015, following the success of the drama Rindu Awak 200%, Ayda got her second lead role in the TV series, Suami Sebelah Rumah opposite, Izzue Islam. She was also cast in the series Isteri Separuh Masa alongside Emma Maembong and Aiman Hakim Ridza. She was once again paired with Zul Ariffin for the drama series adaptation of the novel, M.A.I.D..

She dubbed the Malay language version of the 2014 American science fiction action film, Transformers: Age of Extinction, as Tessa Yeager played by Nicola Peltz.

In July 2015, she released a single "Siapa Diriku" produced by Omar K. The song is about the reality of the life of an artist who is often the victim of criticism netizens on social media. The accompanying music video, which was uploaded on his official YouTube channel on 14 September 2015, managed to reach over one million views in three weeks.

Ayda is well-known across the Malay world. Ayda starred in the Indonesian, RTV telefilm, From Hater to Lover with Dimas Aditya.

== Personal life ==
She was engaged to host and actor Nabil Mahir on April 28, 2020, in conjunction with Nabil's 32nd birthday. The couple got engaged online using the Google Meet app.

Ayda and Nabil solemnised their marriage on 1 January 2021. On 21 September 2021, Ayda gave birth to a daughter, Ana Nayla.

== Discography ==
=== Singles ===
Title	Year	Album
"Beri Aku Waktu" (with Afif)	2011	Beri Aku Waktu
"Cinta Lara" (with Kay Khydir)	2013	Gila-Gila Remaja 2 OST
"Siapa Diriku"	2015	M. A. I. D OST
"Fairytale" (with Alvin Chong)	2015	Hari Malaysia
"Sinaran" (with Lea Ismail)	2015	Sinaran OST
"Pencuri Hati"	2016	Isteri vs Tunang OST
"Nakal Nakal Nakal"	2016	Awak Sangat Nakal OST
"Bawaku Berkelana"	2016	Moana: Original Motion Picture Soundtrack
"Pulanglah" (with Aisyah Aziz)	2016	—
"Mata"	2017	Leftenan Zana OST
"Pinjamkan Hatiku" (with Adi Priyo)	2017	Pinjamkan Hatiku OST
"Temberang"	2018	
"Mana Ada Hati"	2019	Asalkan Dia Bahagia OST
"Better Than You"	2019	
"Parah Parah"	2020	
"Tak Bisa Lepas"	2022	

== Filmography ==
=== Film ===
Year	Title	Role	Notes
2013	Gila-Gila Remaja 2	Zetty	
2013	Oh Mak Kau!	Sara	
2015	Transformers: Age of Extinction	Tessa Yeager	Dubbing (Malay version)
2017	Pinjamkan Hatiku	Laila Safitri	
2025	6 Jilake	Kuntum	

=== Drama ===
Year	Title	Role	Network
2012	Peah Gosip		Astro Warna
2012	Tiara		Astro Prima
2013	Sahara		Astro Prima
2013	Mujahid		TV1
2013	Cinta Kau Dan Aku	Hazlyn	TV1
2013	Harapan	Zubaidah	TVi
2013	Epilog Cinta Khirana	Farah Huda	TV3
2013	Sepai	Peguam Tirana	TV1
2013	Mira Sofea	Zara	Astro Prima
2013	Geng Zul Teksi	Shasha	TV1
2014	Aku Ada Wali	Zahira	TV Alhijrah
2014	Sleeq & Friends		TVi
2014	Anugerah Terindah	Lisa	TV3
2014	Ride	Juju	TV9
2014	Rindu Awak 200%	Armel Aisya	TV3
2014	Apam Lemak Manis	Sherry	TV1
2014	Cintapuccino	Geisha	TVi
2015	Suami Sebelah Rumah	Eryna Hazwan	TV3
2015	Isteri Separuh Masa	Zita	Astro Ria
2015	Cinta Antara Kita	Anita	TV2
2015	M. A. I. D	Noorul	Astro Ria
2016	Menongkah Kasih	Riyana	TV3
2016	#AssalamualaikumCinta	Nia Sakinah	Astro Ria
2016	Awak Sangat Nakal	Erine Johanna	Astro Ria
2017	Ku Kirim Cinta	Nisha	TV3
2017	Dekatkan Jarak Kita	Sofiya / Alyssa	TV3
2018	Cinta Bukan Kristal	Aryana	TV3
2019	Asalkan Dia Bahagia	Adira Imani	TV3
2019	Cindai	Cindai	TV3
2020	Bukan Gadis Biasa	Johana/Jo	TV3
2023	Bukan Cinta Sempurna	Qistina	Astro Ria
2025	Mandul Bukan Pilihan	Farah	Astro Ria

=== Telefilm ===
Year	Title	Role	Network
2011	Cer Citer Cinta	Mira	Astro Ria
2013	Amanah Cinta	Sari	TV9
2013	Calon Menantu	Khariyah	TV1
2013	Hijabista Kampung	Bintang	TVi
2013	Anak Dara Mak Wok	Wawa	TV1
2013	Melodi Sepi		TV1
2014	D'Pantai		TVi
2014	Cinta Hati Suri	Dahlia	TV3
2014	Papa Yibbie	Suhaila	TV9
2014	Ini Harta Haji Nana Yang Punya	Saripah	TV3
2014	Haji Tak Mabrur	Hazwani Murfiqal	TV3
2014	From Hater To Lover	Nura	RTV
2015	Lokum Untuk Mama	Sofea	TV9
2015	Diva	Suria	Astro Prima
2015	Girlfriend Aku Dari Neraka	Tasha	Astro Ria
2015	M. A. I. D Pun Nak Raya	Noorul / Myra	Astro Ria
2015	Isteri Separuh Masa Raya	Zita	Astro Ria
2015	Rindu Awak 200% Raya	Armel Aisya	TV3
2015	Nawaitu Cinta	Melati	Astro Oasis
2015	Kubur Berdarah	Keisha	Astro Ria
2015	Sesejuk Coconut Shake	Zalina	TV1
2016	#AssalamualaikumCinta Raya	Nia Sakinah	Astro Ria
2017	3 Gadis Manis	Mimi	Astro Gempak
2018	Aku Nazmi	Ilya	TV3
2018	Di Penghujung Sujud	Zureen	TV3
2018	Retak	Saida	TV3
2026	Anak Pak Ustaz	Alisya	TV1

=== Web series ===
Year	Title	Role	Network
2015	Oscar, I Miss You	Suraya	Pro Diet Web
2015	Cinta Karan	Aida	Tonton
2016	Sesal Separuh Nyawa	Fara	HyppTV
2016	Cinta Sticky Note	Khaleeda	HyppTV

=== Television ===
Year	Title	Role	TV channels	Notes
2016	Melodi Raya	Pengacara	TV3	bersama Awal Ashaari & AG
2018	Bintang Bersama Bintang	Artis Jemputan	TV3	bersama Shuk Sahar
2018	Ketuk-Ketuk Ramadan	Artis Jemputan	TV1	bersama Sheila Rusly
2018	I Can See Your Voice Malaysia	Artis Jemputan	ntv7	

== Videography ==
Music video appearance
Year	Song title	Singer
2015	Biar Saja	De'Meisis
2015	Kicik Kicik	Mia Sara (feat. TSWG & Cat Farish)
