= Angah Iskandarsah =

Malaysian comedian and actor

- ڠه إسکندرسه
- Born: Iskandersah bin Hashim; 19 June 1978 (age 48); Muar, Johor, Malaysia
- Other name: Angah Raja Lawak
- Education: Sijil Pelajaran Malaysia (SPM)
- Occupations: Comedian; Actor; Host Television; Radio Presenter
- Years active: 2007–present
- Employer: Astro Radio (2018-24)
- Spouse: Amira Asyura Abdul Razak (m. 2016)
- Children: 2

Iskandarsah bin Hashim (Jawi: إسكندرسه بن هشيم; born 19 June 1978), known as Angah Raja Lawak and also Angah Iskandarsah, is a comedian, actor, radio presenter and popular host in Malaysia who began his career in acting in 2009.

== Career ==
He participated in the comedy competition Raja Lawak in 2007. He was one of the main actors in the highest-grossing film in Malaysia, Ngangkung in 2010.

His first appearance on the silver screen was in the film Adnan Sempit directed by Ahmad Idham.

He was also the runner-up in the cooking competition MasterChef Selebriti Malaysia in 2012.

Angah was a radio presenter on Sinar FM from 2018 to 2024 for the morning segment, Pagi Di Sinar, with Jep Sepahtu, Rahim R2 and Siti Elizad.

== Filmography ==
=== Films ===
Year	Title	Character	Notes
2010	Adnan Sempit	Ismad	First film
2010	Semerah Cinta Stilleto	Chicken Seller	
2010	Zoo	Osman	
2010	Ngangkung	Wan	
2011	Alamak Toyol	Fakhrul	
2011	Suatu Malam Kubur Berasak	Atan	
2012	Hantu Dalam Botol Kicap	Ghost in a Soy Sauce Bottle	
2012	Jidin Sengal	Bob Dobot	
2012	Adnan Sempit 2	Ismad	
2012	Uncle Usin	Security	
2012	Taikun	Tai	
2012	Nongkrong	Syakir	
2012	Aku Ada, Kau Ada???	Professor Kus	
2012	Seram Sejuk	Syakir	
2012	Ajiboy	Fauzan	
2013	Wawa Semput	Ismad	
2013	Bro, Nampak Motor Gua?	Bomoh	Special appearance
2013	Adnan Sempit 3	Ismad	
2013	Hello	Aki	
2013	Aku Pilih Kamu	Haris	
2013	Laki-Laki	Abu	

=== Drama ===
Year	Title	Character	TV Channel	Notes
2009	Minima Impact	Himself	Astro Warna	First drama
2009	Minima Impact Part 2	Himself	Astro Warna	
2009	E-Toyol.com	Bob	TV3	
2010	Adnan Semp-It The Series	Ismad	Astro Warna	
2010	Ulek Mayang	Madi	TV3	
2019	Sepahtu Reunion Raya Gear 5	Bank Officer	Astro Ria	

=== Telefilm ===
Year	Title	Character	TV Channel	Notes
2009	Geng Raya Zizan	Pak Ngah	Astro Ria	First telefilm
2010	Pak Nil Ibu Kirim Salam		Astro Prima	Guest actor
2023	Sepahtu Rewang Kampung Kenangan		Astro Warna	

=== Television ===
Year	Title	Role	TV Channel	Notes
2009	lawaKing	Various	Astro Prima	
2012	MasterChef Selebriti Malaysia (Season 1)	Contestants	Astro Ria	
2012	Betul Ke Bohong? (Season 1)	Guest Artist	Astro Warna	Episodes 1 & 12 (Semi-Finals)
2012	Betul Ke Bohong? (Season 2)	Guest Artist	Astro Warna	Episode 13 (Final)
2012–2013	Betul Ke Bohong? (Season 3)	Guest Artist	Astro Warna	Episodes 1 & 11 (Quarter Finals)
2014	Kuali Terbalik	Host	Astro Warna	
2015	Betul Ke Bohong? (Season 6)	Ray's Team	Astro Warna	Assistant Captain
2015	Betul Ke Bohong? (Season 7)	Ray's Team	Astro Warna	Assistant Captain
2015	Sepahtu Reunion 2015	Students	Astro Warna	Guest Artist: Episode "Drama Class"
2015	Sepahtu Reunion 2015	Choreography Teacher	Astro Warna	Guest Artist: Episode "Fantasy Academy"
2015	Sepahtu Reunion 2015	Juvana Student	Astro Warna	Guest Artist: Episode "Juvana"
2016	Sembang Pacak	Host	Astro Warna	with Nabil Ahmad
2016	Maharaja Lawak Mega 2016	Participants (LOL Group)	Astro Warna	Paired with Ajak Shiro and Tauke Jambu
2017	Maharaja Lawak Mega 2017	Host	Astro Warna	This 30-minute show
2017	Bas Stop	Hj. Midun	Astro Warna	
2017	Sepahtu Reunion Al-Puasa	Tok Imam	Astro Warna	Guest Artist: Episode "Hitam Putih Ramadan"
2020–2022, 2023–present	The Masked Singer Malaysia	Permanent Jury	Astro Warna	
2019	Sepahtu Reunion Live 2019	Haji Azhar	Astro Warna	Guest Artist: Episode "Masihkah Ada Percaya"
2021	Sepahtu Reunion Live 2021	Putra	Astro Warna	Guest Artist: Episode "Harapan"
2021	Sepahtu Reunion Live 2021	Farid	Astro Warna	Guest Artist: Episode "Darat Yang Dilupa"
2021	Sepahtu Reunion Live 2021	Helmi	Astro Warna	Guest Artist: Episode "Dilema"
2021	Sepahtu Reunion Live 2021	Haji Meor	Astro Warna	Guest Artist: Episode "Mengharapkan Pagar"
2022	Warung Sepahtu 2	Tok Ketua	Astro Warna	

== Radiography ==
=== Radio ===
Year	Title	Station
2 January 2018 – 31 July 2024	Pagi Di Sinar	Sinar

== Awards and nominations ==
- Fifth place in the Raja Lawak Season 1 competition
- Nominated for Popular Male Comedy Artist (ABPBH) 2010
- Fourth place MLM 2016
