= Amelina (singer) =

Malaysian singer and actress (born 1974)

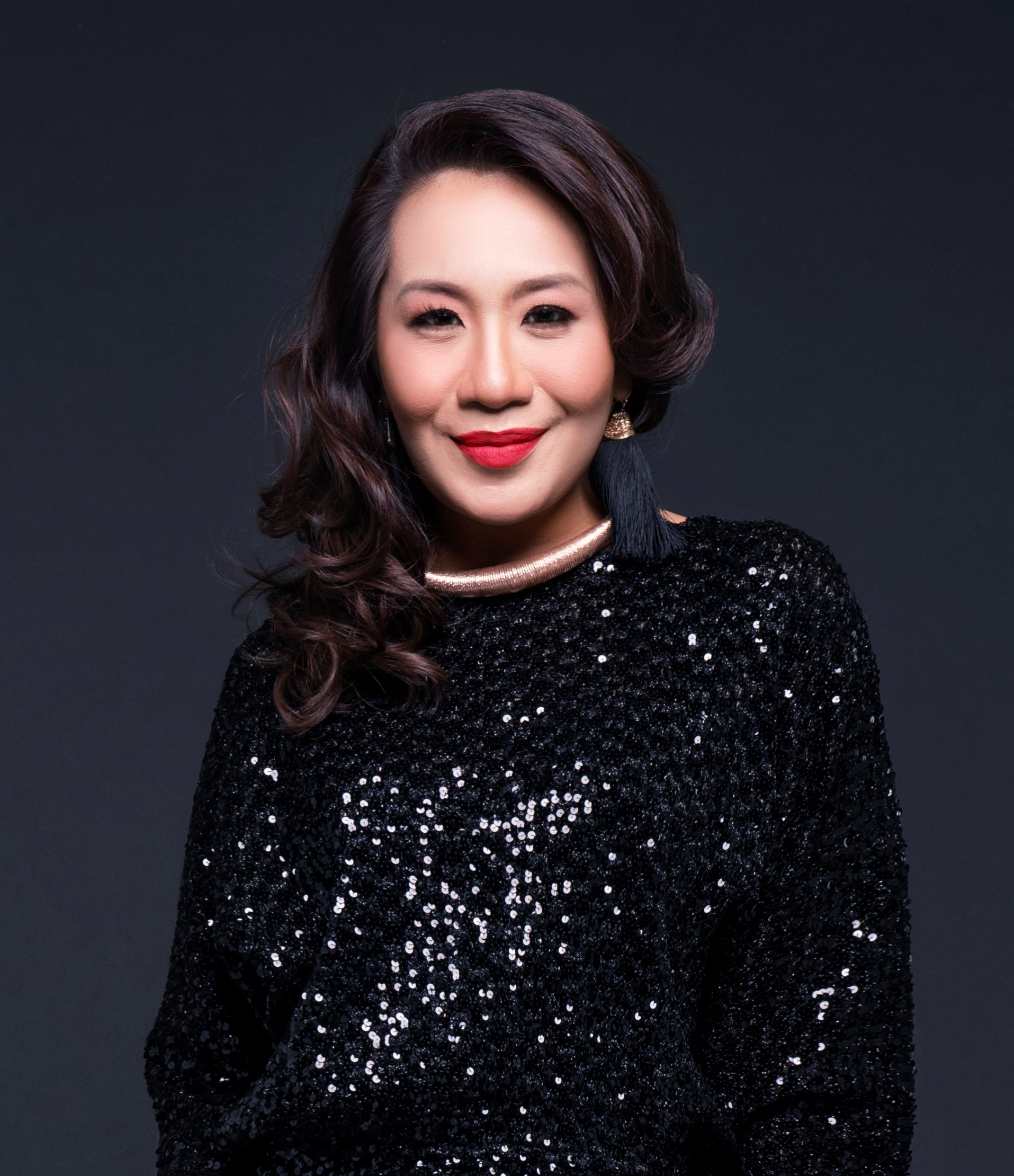
- Amelina in 2018
- Born: Norazlina binti Amir Sharipuddin; 4 August 1974 (age 51); Nilai, Negeri Sembilan, Malaysia
- Other names: Alin; Kak Long
- Education: Sijil Pelajaran Malaysia (SPM)
- Occupations: Singer; actress
- Years active: 1994–1999, 2014–present
- Musical career
- Genres: Dangdut; pop; ballad
- Instrument: Vocals
- Label: Warner Music Malaysia (1994–1999)

Norazlina Amir Sharipuddin, known professionally as Amelina (born 4 August 1974) is a Malaysian singer. She found success during the 1990s. She is known for popularizing Dangdut music, a type of popular music, from which she earned the title Ratu Dangdut Malaysia ("Malaysian Queen of Dangdut").

== Early life ==
Amelina was born on 4 August 1974 in Nilai, Negeri Sembilan. She is the eldest of three children born to Hasmah Ramli and Amir Sharipuddin Abdul Raof. She attended school in her hometown before migrating to Kuala Lumpur to become a singer in 1994 at age 20. Prior to music, she worked in a TDK electronics factory.

As an artist, Amelina was managed by her brother Amir Hanafi and assisted by her mother, Hasmah, who was responsible for the idea to try Dangdut. Amelina gifted her a piece of land in her hometown to build a bungalow to house her family.

== Discography ==
Studio albums

- Amelina (1994)
- Asyik (1995)
- Cinta Oh Cinta (1997)

== Filmography ==
=== Drama ===
Year	Title	Role	TV channels
1996	Sambal	Tipah	TV3
2019	Kariah Cak Pong	Mak Ndak Bella	TV3
2019	Patah Sayap Bertongkat Paruh	Maznah	Astro Ria
2021	Rahimah Tanpa Rahim	Puan Sakinah	TV3

=== Telemovie ===
Year	Title	Role	TV channels
2017	Diva Raya	Herself	Astro Ria

=== Television ===
Year	Title	Role	TV channels
2018	Gegar Vaganza (season 5)	Herself/Participant	Astro Ria
2021	Famili Duo	Herself/Participant	TV3
