= MK K-Clique =

Musical artist

- محمد هايري امين
- Born: Muhammad Hairi Amin bin Hamdan; 27 July 1996 (age 30); Tawau, Sabah, Malaysia
- Other names: MK K-Clique; Hairiwhuut
- Education: Universiti Teknologi MARA (UiTM), Kota Kinabalu, Sabah
- Occupations: Rapper; singer; songwriter; media personality; actor; model
- Years active: 2010–present
- Spouse: Siti Hajar Syeikh Nordin (m. 2023)
- Children: 1
- Musical career
- Genres: Pop; rap; R&B; dance-pop; hip hop
- Instruments: Vocals
- Labels: K-Clique Records (Official Label); Todak Music (Affiliated Label); Distribution : Warner Music Malaysia, Believe Music; Publishing : Warner Chappell Music

Muhammad Hairi Amin bin Hamdan (born 27 July 1996), known professionally as MK K-Clique (briefly Hairi Whuut), is a Malaysian rapper, singer, songwriter, media personality, actor, and model. He is a member of K-Clique, a Sabahan-based group. His fame dates to 2018 when his group, K-Clique released their song titled Lane Lain Line on YouTube and became the local artist with the highest streams for Malaysia on Spotify in 2019. In 2020, K-Clique was nominated for Best Southeast Asia Act at the 2020 MTV Europe Music Awards (EMA).

After several years in the music and acting industry, MK announced his own clothing brands, Three O' Two. The brand name inspired from a Penal Code Section 302 in the Laws of Malaysia: Act 574.

== Personal life ==
Muhammad Hairi Amin bin Hamdan was born on 27 July 1996 at Tawau General Hospital, Tawau, Sabah. When Hairi was very young, he was raised in a remote village called Tanjung Batu Tengah.

Hairi graduated from Universiti Teknologi MARA (UiTM), Kota Kinabalu campus in Sabah. During his studies, he and his friends—Noki, Tuju, Somean, KDeaf, FareedPF, Gnello dan NastyNas—formed a rap group called K-Clique.

== Discography ==
=== Singles with K-Clique ===
Year	Title	Composer
2018	Lane Lain Line	Tuju, Noki, MK, GNello, FareedPF, SoMean
2018	Sah Tu Satu	Tuju, Noki, MK, GNello, FareedPF, SoMean, Na$tyNas, KDeaf
2018	Memorabilia (feat. XNADS)	GNello, FareedPF
2018	Licik	Tuju
2019	Warna	Tuju, MK
2019	Mimpi (feat. Alif)	Tuju, Noki, MK, GNello, FareedPF, SoMean
2019	Beg 2 Back	Tuju, Noki, MK, GNello, FareedPF, SoMean, Na$tyNas, KDeaf
2019	Kamu Okay	Noki, GNello, Na$tyNas, KDeaf
2020	Kitta Move	Tuju, Noki, MK, GNello, FareedPF, SoMean, Na$tyNas, KDeaf
2020	Merais	Tuju, Noki, MK, GNello, FareedPF, SoMean, Na$tyNas, KDeaf
2020	Pulang (feat. AJ)	MK, GNello, SoMean
2021	Sebelum/ Paracetamol	Tuju, Noki, MK, GNello, FareedPF, SoMean, Na$tyNas, KDeaf
2022	SUSTENTO	Saucie-J, Tuju, Noki, MK, GNello, FareedPF, SoMean, Na$tyNas, KDeaf

=== Guest appearances ===
Year	Title	Lead artist(s)	Featuring
2019	"Bal"	Caprice	Tuju, ‘’’MK’’’ & Zynakal
2019	"BossKu"	MeerFly	Tuju, ‘’’MK’’’ & Somean
2019	Haa Tepok	MeerFly	Kidd Santhe & ‘’’MK’’’
2019	Noir	FareedPF (K-Clique)	GNello, AxelJonas, IYB Midnight & ‘’’MK’’’
2019	Kejar Masa	Zemo (KCHCXN) & MK	
2019	Garis	Azamrhadio, MK & $an	
2019	IMSO	Lil J, Alan D & MK	—
2020	Peluang Kedua	Nabila Razali	—
2020	Zoom Zoom Zoom	'MK’, Noki Gnello (K-Clique), Kidd Santhe, Cat Farish	—
2021	Ciao	Joe Flizzow	ALYPH Magic Potions (Producer) SonaOne Kid Kenobi (Additional Arrangement) ‘’’MK’’’& Jay Park (Vocals)
2021	Camtu	SENNA	Wolfy (Producer) ‘’’MK’’’ (Vocals)
2021	Payung Pelangi	Noki & MK (K-Clique)	—
2021	Veto	DJ CZA	TUJULOCA (Vocals) ‘’’MK’’’ (Vocals)
2022	Tragi$ (OST Rompak)	TUJULOCA, MK & Chubb-E	—
2022	Sapu Rata (PUBG Mobile Malaysia Theme Song 2022)	MK	Wolfy (Producer)
2023	Lampu Biru (REMIX)	Lucidrari & FITTO	FITTO (Producer) & (Mixing Mastering) ‘’’MK K-Clique’’’ (Vocals) Dannqrack (Vocals) Eemrun (Vocals)
2023	Malampagi (REMIX)	Saixse	TaimetMusic (Producer) MingAling, Wolfy (Co Producer) (Mixing Mastering) ‘’’MK’’’ (Vocals)

== Filmography ==
=== Film ===
Year	Title	Character	Remarks
2021	Marabahaya Underground	MK	First film
2022	Bunga dan Kayu	Noah	
2022	Rompak	Daniel	
2022	7 Minggu Sebelum Kahwin	Amar Baharom	
2024	Mustaqim	Mustaqim	
2024	Rebel	Bono	
2024	Paku Tanah Jawa	Dato' Riza	Indonesia movie

=== Drama ===
Year	Title	Character	TV Channel	Remarks
2021	The Hotel	Sean	Astro Ria	First drama
2021	Oh My Hantaran	Rizal	TV9	
2024	Aku Bukan Ustazah	Adam	TV3	

=== Television ===
Year	Title	Character	TV Channel	Remarks
2019	MeleTOP	Himself	Astro Ria	with K-Clique
2019	Unplugged	Himself	Astro Ria	with K-Clique
2019	Trek Selebriti	Himself	Astro Ria	Episode 9 guest

=== Music video ===
Year	Song title	Singer	Producer
2020	Peluang Kedua	Nabila Razali	Warner Chappell Music
