= Michael Ang =

Malaysian filmmaker and actor (born 1970)

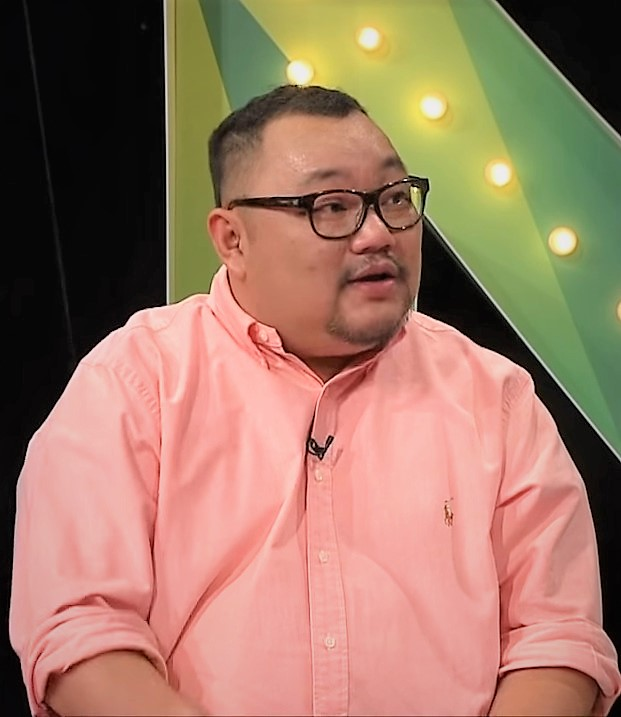
- Ang was interviewed on the show MeleTOP on Astro Ria on 31 March 2015.
- Born: Michael Ang Hai Swee; 16 September 1970 (age 56); Alor Gajah, Melaka, Malaysia
- Education: Master of Filmmaking; University of New South Wales
- Occupations: Director; Producer; Screen Writer; Actor; Singer
- Years active: 1997–present

Michael Ang Hai Swee (Chinese: 昂海郑; born 16 March 1970) is a Malaysian director, producer, screenwriter and actor. Michael is the owner of the production company Cube Film Sdn Bhd.

== Career ==
Anak (2008) is Michael's first film starring Erra Fazira and Ida Nerina, in which he served as a screenwriter. He is known for directing several television drama series including Dalam Hati Ada Taman (2012), Projek Memikat Suami (2013), Dia Semanis Honey (2015), Suri Hati Mr. Pilot (2016), Rahsia Hati Perempuan (2018) and Sweet Dreams (2019). His directorial debut, Kimchi Untuk Awak was released in 2017.

He is also active in the music industry by releasing his first single, "Cinta Atau Propa".

== Personal life ==
Michael unexpectedly revealed on 30 April 2019 that he had converted to Islam because he did not want the public to question his religious status. His decision to convert to Islam was blessed by his mother.

== Discography ==
Year	Title	Note
2022	"Cinta Atau Propa"	

== Filmography ==
=== Movies ===
Year	Title	Credited as				Character	Note
Year	Title	Director	Publisher	Author	Actor	Character	Note
2008	Anak	No	No	Yes	No	—	
2014	Ophilia	No	No	No	Yes	Ah Beng	First feature film
2017	Kimchi Untuk Awak	Yes	No	Yes	No	—	First directorial film
2021	Mat Bond Malaya	No	No	No	Yes	Himself	Special appearance
2023	Polis Evo 3	No	No	No	Yes	Chao	Special appearance
2023	Pagari Bulan	No	No	No	Yes	Ah Seng	
2024	The Experts	No	No	No	Yes	Chef Juan	Special appearance
2025	Martabat: Misi Berdarah	No	No	No	Yes	Director Fabian	

=== Drama ===
Year	Title	Credited as				Character	TV Channel	Note
Year	Title	Director	Publisher	Author	Actor	Character	TV Channel	Note
2011	Biar Mimpi Sampai Ke Bintang	Yes	No	No	No	—	Astro Ria	
2012	Dalam Hati Ada Taman	Yes	No	No	No	—	Astro Ria	
2013	Benci Vs Cinta	Yes	No	No	No	—	Astro Ria	
2013–2014	Projek Memikat Suami	Yes	No	No	No	—	Astro Ria	
2015	Isteri Separuh Masa	Yes	No	No	No	—	Astro Ria	
2016	Dia Semanis Honey	Yes	Yes	No	No	—	Astro Ria	Instructions with the Hadith of Omar
2016	Dia Semanis Honeymoon	Yes	Yes	No	No	—	Astro Ria	Instructions with the Hadith of Omar
2016	Isteri Vs Tunang	Yes	No	No	No	—	Astro Ria	
2016	Assalamualaikum Cinta	Yes	No	No	No	—	Astro Ria	
2016	Suri Hati Mr. Pilot	Yes	Yes	No	No	—	Astro Ria	
2017	Hero Seorang Cinderella	Yes	No	No	No	—	Astro Ria	
2017	Urusan Hati Cik Drama Queen	Yes	No	No	No	—	Astro Ria	Instruction with Hadith Omar
2017	Red Velvet	No	Yes	No	No	—	Astro Ria	
2017–2018	My Coffee Prince	Yes	No	No	No	—	Astro Ria	Adaptation of the Korean drama The 1st Shop of Coffee Prince
2018	Rahsia Hati Perempuan	Yes	No	No	No	—	Astro Ria	
2019	Setelah Terlafaznya Akad	Yes	No	No	Yes	Final episode cameo	Astro Ria	
2019	Sweet Dreams	Yes	Yes	No	Yes	Uncle Wong	Astro Ria	
2020	Perempuan Tanpa Dosa	Yes	No	No	No	—	Astro Ria	
2020–2021	Angkara Cinta	No	Yes	No	No	—	Astro Prima	Adaptation of the Philippine drama Tayong Dalawa
2021	Marry Me Senorita	Yes	Yes	No	No	—	Astro Ria	Co-directed by Nur Ain Sharif
2021	Love Elsa	Yes	Yes	No	No	—	Astro Ria	
2021	The Hotel	No	Yes	No	No	—	Astro Ria	
2021	The Hotel 2: Jiwa Yang Kau Puja	No	Yes	No	No	—	Astro Ria	
2021	Sihir	Yes	Yes	No	No	—	Astro Ria	Co-directed by Azmir Affendi
2021	Tikam	Yes	Yes	No	Yes	Mike	Astro Ria	Instruction with Hadith Omar
2021–2022	I Promise Janji Anaqi	No	Yes	No	No	—	Astro Ria	
2022	Setelah Terlafaznya Akad 2	Yes	Yes	No	No	—	Astro Ria	
2022	Jodohku Babysitter	No	Yes	No	No	—	Astro Ria	
2022	The Maid 2	No	Yes	No	No	—	Astro Ria	
2023	One Million Dollar Voice	Yes	No	No	Yes	Mike	Astro Ria	Special appearance
2024	Dari Mata Turun Ke Hati	Yes	Yes	No	No	—	Astro Ria	
2024	Kelas Tahanan Cikgu Hiragi	Yes	Yes	No	No	—	Astro Ria	
2025	Bunga Bunga Cinta	Yes	No	No	Yes	Mr. Razman	Astro Ria	

=== Telefilm ===
Year	Title	Credited as				Character	TV Channel	Notes
Year	Title	Director	Producer	Writer	Actors	Character	TV Channel	Notes
2011	Penanggal	Yes	Yes	No	No	—	Astro Ria	
2012	Patah Seribu	Yes	Yes	No	No	—	Astro Ria	
2013	Bibik Aku Nak Kahwin	Yes	No	Yes	Yes	Ajis	Astro Ria	
2014	Hantu Selfie	Yes	Yes	No	No	—	Astro Ria	
2015	Hantu Wefie	Yes	Yes	No	No	—	Astro Ria	
2016	Dia Semanis Honey Raya	Yes	Yes	No	No	—	Astro Ria	Instruction with Hadith Omar
2016	Kulit	Yes	No	No	No	—	Astro Citra	
2017	Suri Hati Mr. Pilot Raya	No	Yes	No	No	—	Astro Ria	
2017	Aku Mahu Hidup	No	No	No	Yes	Raymond	TV9	
2018	Hantu Judi	Yes	Yes	No	No	—	Astro Citra	
2018	Hantu Rumah Sakit Jiwa	Yes	Yes	No	No	—	Astro First Exclusive	
2019	Titi Kayu	No	No	No	Yes	Cheong Ah Ling/Alim	TV3	
2023	Raya Sebagai Isteri	Yes	Yes	No	No	—	Astro Ria	

=== Television ===
Year	Title	As	TV Channels
2012	MasterChef Malaysia	Participants	Astro Ria
2014	Super Spontan 2014	Participants	Astro Warna
2019–2020	Michael Ang's Halal Kitchen	Host	Astro Ria
2020/2022	The Masked Singer Malaysia	Jury	Astro Warna
2023	Dapur Tempur Selebriti	Jury	TV9

=== Theater ===
Year	Title	Character	Notes
2017	Dia Semanis Honey Musical	—	As producer
