= Misha Omar =

Malaysian singer, songwriter and actress (born 1982)

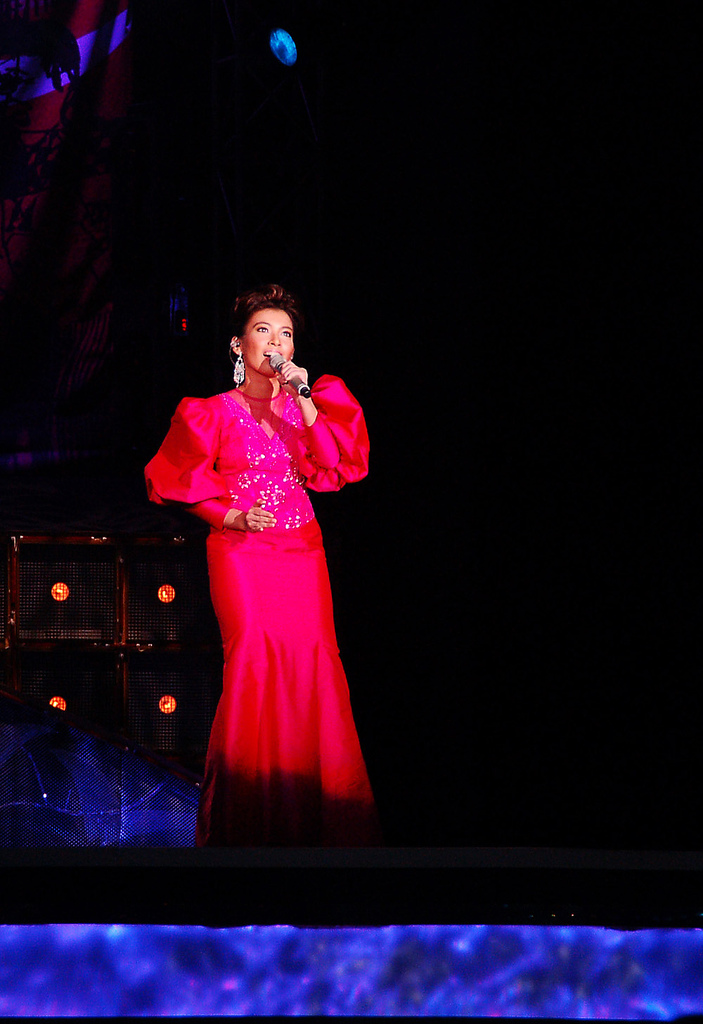
- Misha Omar at the Sudirman Tribute Concert stage April 2007.
- Born: Samihah Aisah binti Omar; 6 January 1982 (age 44); Kota Bharu, Kelantan, Malaysia
- Occupations: Singer; songwriter; record producer; lyricist; actress; model; lawyer; businesswoman
- Years active: 2002–present
- Spouse: Firoz Ezzwan Rossly (m. 2014)
- Children: 3
- Parent(s): Omar Ismail; Zainan Mat. Nor
- Musical career
- Genres: Pop; R&B; pop rock
- Instrument: Vocals
- Label: Sony Music Malaysia (2002-present)

Samihah Aisah bint Omar (born 6 January 1982), known professionally as Misha Omar, is a Malaysian pop singer, songwriter and actress. She has won won 8 Anugerah Juara Lagu trophies, 5 Anugerah Industri Muzik, 3 Anugerah Era & a trophy each from the Malaysia Film Festival and the Berita Harian Popular Bintang Award. She is from Machang, Kelantan and began her career in the field of voice since she was 19 years old after participating in the Bintang RTM 2001 competition. Her popularity peaked after achieving success with the song Bunga-bunga Cinta, and continued to remain popular until she was on par with the popularity of other female singers such as Siti Nurhaliza, Dayang Nurfaizah, Liza Hanim, Ning Baizura and Jaclyn Victor, becoming one of the most influential and best-selling female singers in the 2000s.

Misha is also one of the few Malaysian artists who has managed to make a name for herself in Asia, especially after winning the gold award at the Asian Music Awards in Shanghai in 2003. Misha has been nominated for the MTV Asia Awards twice and was selected to perform at the MTV World Stage in 2009. She is also the first Malaysian artist to have a Vevo account on YouTube and her songs were also among the earliest Malaysian songs to be sold on iTunes and she is a pioneer in the use of high-tech microphones among local A-grade artists.

== Early life and education ==
Misha is the fourth of seven children to an ethnic Malay couple, Omar Ismail, a civil servant, and Zainan Mohd Nor, a housewife, the latter in whom also has several children from a previous marriage. Misha completed her schooling at Kubang Kerian Secondary School 1, Kota Bharu, Kelantan in 1999 and continued her studies in management at Universiti Tun Abdul Razak in 2000. Misha has been interested in singing since she was a child and often sang karaoke with her family in Kampung Bayam Guchil, Kota Bharu, where her first favorite pop song was the song Menaruh Harapan (Zaiton Sameon). As a teenager, Misha began to be interested in singers Fauziah Latiff and Liza Hanim because of the softness of their voices that resonated with sentimental rhythms, to the point that Misha often sang their songs in the bathroom. Misha also revealed that when she was a teenager, she was interested in pop music performed by Amy Mastura, as well as admiring the versatile artist's acting talent.

== Discography ==
Studio albums

- Misha (2002)
- Aksara (2004)
- Misha Omar (2008)

EPs

- Set Pilihan Misha (2012)

Compilation albums

- Dia...Misha (2011)
- Hits Terbaik - Misha Omar dan Jaclyn Victor (2015)
