= Emma Maembong =

Malaysian actress and model

- Born: Fatimah Rohani binti Ismail; 27 March 1992 (age 34); Kota Bharu , Kelantan , Malaysia
- Education: Homeschooled
- Occupations: Actress; Model
- Years active: 2012–present
- Height: 155 cm (5 ft 1 in)
- Spouse: Muhammad Shazli Azhar (m. 2020; div. 2024)
- Children: 2
- Parent(s): Ismail Embong (father); Yatimah Zainab (née Janet Nicole) (mother)
- Relatives: Chacha Maembong (sister); Yaya Maembong (sister); Bakri Maembong (brother)

Fatimah Rohani binti Ismail (born 27 March 1992), known professionally as Emma Maembong, is a Malaysian actress and model of Scottish descent. She is best known by her roles as Munirah in Kau Yang Terindah, Nawwal Husna in Projek Memikat Suami, Aryana in Yes Boss, Medina Izwani in Isteri Separuh Masa and Farhah in Tersuka Tanpa Sengaja.

== Early life ==
Fatimah Rohani binti Ismail was born on 27 March 1992 to Ismail Embong, who is also known by his moniker Maembong, a well-known national arts artist and Yatimah Zainab (née Janet Nicole), a British immigrant. Her last name (Maembong) was obtained by combining her father's name, Ismail with her grandfather's name, Embong. She is the 9th daughter of 11 siblings with a mixed parentage of a Scottish mother and a Malay father. Her younger sister, Chacha Maembong is also an actress.

== Filmography ==
=== Film ===
Year	Title	Role	Notes
2014	Werewolf Dari Bangladesh	Jenab	Debut film appearances
2017	Kimchi Untuk Awak	Bella/Salsabila	
2018	Hantu Rumah Sakit Jiwa	Nurse	Television movie
2019	Garang		
2021	Frontliner	Nora	
2021	Bisikan Jenazah	Emma	Indonesia movie
2024	Jangan Pandang Belakang 2: Aku Tahu Usulmu	Lynn	

=== Telemovie ===
Year	Title	Role	TV channel	Notes
2013	Satu Hari Di Hari Raya	Dahlia	TV3	
2013	Menantu Raya	Aishah	TV3	
2013	Ciptaan Terindah	Syifa	TV3	
2014	Hantu Selfie	Hantu Emma	Astro Ria	
2015	Hidup	Soraya	Astro Ria	
2015	Hantu Wefie	Hantu Emma	Astro Ria	
2015	Madam Nona Pokok Sena	Aisyah	Astro Prima	
2015	Isteri Separuh Masa Raya	Medina Izwani	Astro Ria	
2016	Pontianak Sesat Dalam Kampung	Pontianak Rose	Astro Ria	
2016	Tersuka Tanpa Sengaja Raya	Farhah	Astro Ria	Farhah dead after giving birth to her son
2016	#AssalammualaikumCinta Raya	Emma Harlini	Astro Ria	
2016	Satu Tahun Lagi	Lara	Astro Ria	
2017	Tangisan Kubur		Astro Citra	
2017	Cermin Dimana Mana	Liya	Astro Ceria	
2017	Sayang Papa Saya Tak Raya?	Raisya	Astro Ria	
2018	Hantu Judi	Hantu Tudung	Astro Citra	
2018	Sesaat Bahagiaku	Zila	NTV7	
2019	Cassandra	Cassandra	TV3	
2019	Silang	Dura	TV3	
2020	Dia Kembarku	Amira/Amina	TV3	
2022	Artis Pujaanku Mai Beraya	Syafinaz	TV3	
2022	Raya Talak Satu	Riana	TV3	
2022	Afundi Piring Bulat	Lili	Astro Gemilang	
2022	Busung Katak	Kak Wan	Astro Citra	
2022	Nyang	Sara	Astro Citra	
2023	Langit Tak Mendengar	Jue	Astro Ria	

=== Television series ===
Year	Title	Role	TV channel	Notes
2012	Kau Yang Terindah	Munirah	TV3	
2012	Cinta Itu Milikku	Rania	TV3	
2013	Kampung Girl	Anisah	TV3	
2013	3 Nenek 3 Dara	Suhaila	RTM	
2013	Projek Memikat Suami	Nawwal Husna	Astro Ria	
2014	Yes Boss!	Aryana	TV3	
2014	Astana Cinta Aleesa	Aleesa	TV9	
2014	Syurga Tanpa Cinta	Amelia	TV1	
2015	Isteri Separuh Masa	Medina Izwani	Astro Ria	
2015	Jodoh Sebelah Pintu	Mona Airawani	HyppTV	
2015	Tersuka Tanpa Sengaja	Farhah	Astro Ria	
2016	#Assalamualaikum Cinta	Emma Harlini	Astro Ria	
2016	Nasi Minyak Kuah Cinta	Mia	TV3	
2017	Sayang Papa Saya Tak ?	Raisya	Astro Ria	
2017	Jangan Ikut Aku	Shila	TV3	
2017	Awak Suka Saya Tak ?	Intan Zulaikha	Astro Ria	
2017	Dia	Tina	TV3	
2017	My Coffee Prince	Girlfriend of Raykal	Astro Ria	
2018	Cik Sempurna	Noreen	TV3	
2018	Jangan Padam Rindu	Ellina	TV1	
2018	Pencuri Cinta Kelas Satu	Aisya Humaira	Astro Oasis	
2019	Celup	Ria	Astro Gempak	
2019	Ajari Playboy Itu	Julia	TV3	
2019	Kerana Dia Manusia Biasa	Nurin Aira	TV3	
2019	Cemburu Seorang Perempuan	Emilia	Astro Ria	
2020	Bicara Cinta	Anis Sofea	TV3	
2021	Sis Stars Hotel	Natasha	Awesome TV	
2021	I Promise Janji Anaqi	Hayra	Astro Ria	
2022	Aku Pilih Berbahagia	Dhiya	TV1	
2022	Nusyuz Berkiblat Cinta	Hawa	Astro Ria	
2022	Remang	Jane	TV3	Episode: "Dendam Saka"
2023	One Million Dollar Voice	TJ	Astro Ria	
2024	Takdir Itu Milik Aku	Dian Zara	Astro Ria	
2024	Wanita Milik Kaiden	Haila	TV3	
2025	Seribu Tahun	Imaan Suhana	Astro Ria	
2025	Omar	Umm Kulthum Bint Ali	TV3	
2025–2026	Santau Perempuan Terlarang	Sapora	tonton	

=== Television ===
Year	Title	Role	TV channel	Notes
2013	The House	Herself	Astro Ria	
2013	Ketuk Ketuk Syawal	Invited Artist	TV1	
2015	Ketuk Ketuk Ramadhan	Invited Artist	TV1	
2022	The Masked Singer Malaysia (season 2)	Guest Jury	Astro Warna	Replaced Remy Ishak
2022	The Masked Singer Malaysia (season 3)	Jury	Astro Warna	

== Awards and nominations ==
Year	Award	Category	Outcome
2012	Anugerah Bintang Popular Berita Harian	Most Popular Female New Artist	Nominated
2014	100 Most Beautiful Faces TC Candler	Ranked 71st	Nominated
2014	Anugerah Stail EH!	Selebriti Harapan Pilihan	Won
2015	Media Hiburan Online Award	Popular Actress	Won, ranked first with 2.5 m followers on Instagram
2016	Anugerah Bintang Popular Berita Harian	Pelakon TV Wanita Popular	Won
2016	Anugerah Bintang Popular Berita Harian	Pelakon Filem Wanita Popular	Nominated
2018	Anugerah Bintang Popular Berita Harian	Pelakon Filem Wanita Popular	Won
