= Ramona Zamzam =

Malaysian actress

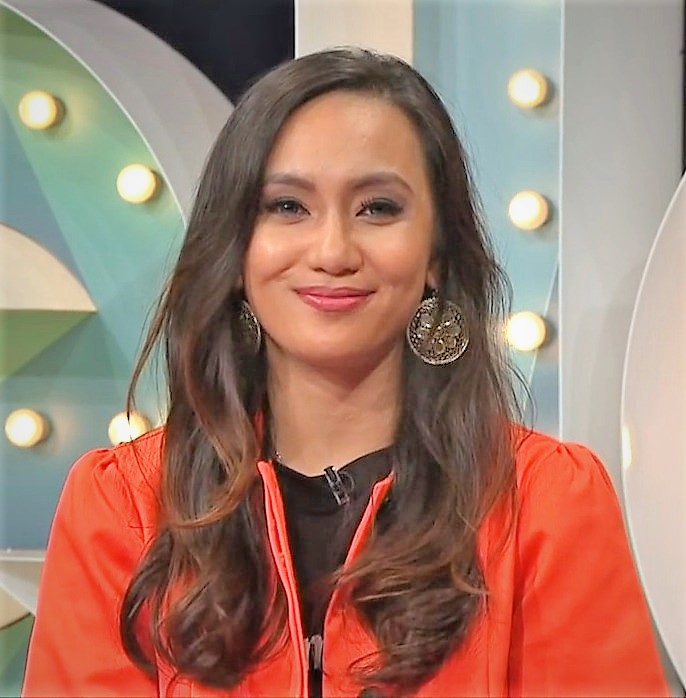
- Zamzam on MeleTOP in 2015.
- Born: Ros Ramona Qadira binti Mohd Zamzam; June 25, 1990 (age 36); Bukit Mertajam, Penang, Malaysia
- Occupations: Actress, model, television host, businesswoman
- Years active: 2002–present

Ros Ramona Qadira binti Mohd Zamzam (born June 25, 1990) is a Malaysian actress who works in television and film. She was a contestant of Dewi Remaja 2009/10.

== Personal life ==
Ramona is a Malaysian of Malay, Pakistani, German and Thai descent. She was born in Bukit Mertajam, Penang and grew up in Ipoh, Perak. She is the eldest of two siblings. At the age of four, she was sent to a Chinese school. She holds a degree in business at SEGI College (now SEGi University).

Zamzam married Palestinian man Rami Alashkar on May 1, 2015. The couple have a daughter, Ivanna Alashkar.

== Filmography ==
=== Film ===
Year	Title	Role	Notes
2006	Castello	Club Waiter	Extra cast
2010	2 Hati Satu Jiwa	Sheila	Uncredited
2012	Sepah The Movie	Rosita	
2015	Jengka	Nini	
2017	Hospital	Ramona	
2018	KL Special Force	Nadia	
