= List of number-one songs of 2017 (Malaysia) =

Below is a list of songs that topped the RIM Charts in 2017 according to the Recording Industry Association of Malaysia.

== Chart history ==
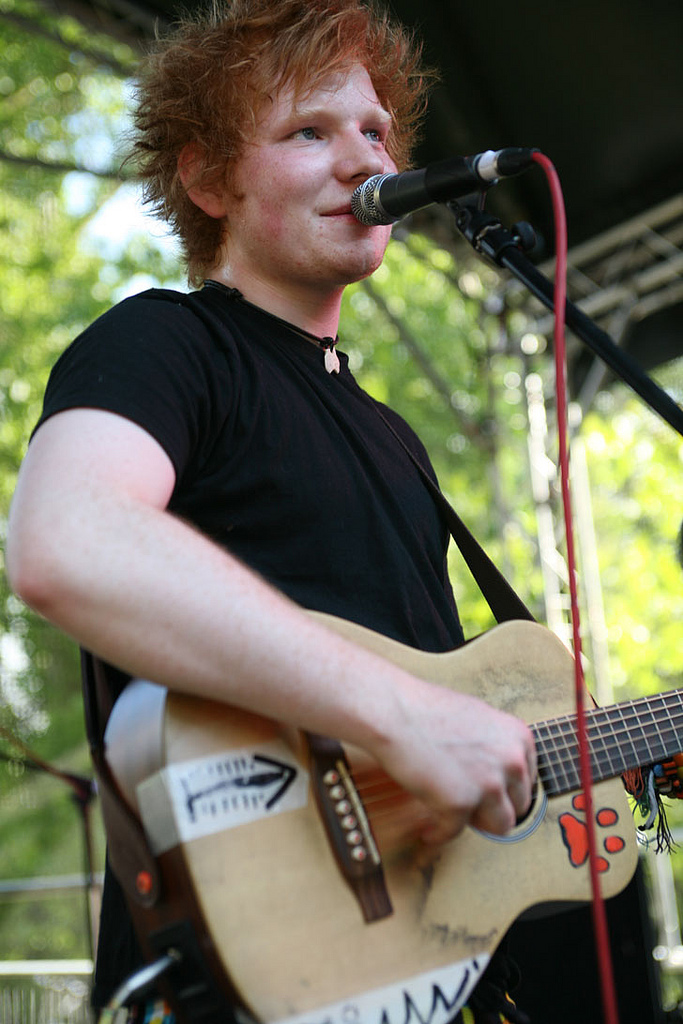
British singer-songwriter Ed Sheeran (pictured) had two number-one songs throughout the year.

The yellow background indicates the best-performing International song of 2017.

The green background indicates the best-performing Domestic song of 2017.

Issue Date	International & Domestic songs				Domestic songs			
Issue Date	Song	Artist(s)	Weekly Streams	Ref.	Song	Artist(s)	Weekly Streams	Ref.
2 February (Note: The first chart published by RIM is for the week ending 9 February 2017. Shape of You was the number-one song in the previous week.)	"Shape of You"	Ed Sheeran	N/A		N/A			
9 February	"Shape of You"	Ed Sheeran	432,552		"Wanita Terakhir"	Fattah Amin	92,853	
16 February	"Shape of You"	Ed Sheeran	471,547		"Segalanya"	Haqiem Rusli	66,620	
23 February	"Shape of You"	Ed Sheeran	492,166		"Segalanya"	Haqiem Rusli	67,280	
2 March	"Something Just Like This"	The Chainsmokers & Coldplay	537,844		"Sabar"	Ismail Izzani	141,434	
9 March	"Shape of You"	Ed Sheeran	597,263		"Menahan Rindu"	Wany Hasrita	89,966	
16 March	"Shape of You"	Ed Sheeran	545,215		"Menahan Rindu"	Wany Hasrita	91,611	
23 March	"Shape of You"	Ed Sheeran	528,456		"Menahan Rindu"	Wany Hasrita	106,234	
30 March	"Shape of You"	Ed Sheeran	480,038		"Menahan Rindu"	Wany Hasrita	103,436	
6 April	"Shape of You"	Ed Sheeran	432,007		"Menahan Rindu"	Wany Hasrita	96,738	
13 April	"Something Just Like This"	The Chainsmokers & Coldplay	414,806		"Menahan Rindu"	Wany Hasrita	95,054	
20 April	"Shape of You"	Ed Sheeran	392,239		"Menahan Rindu"	Wany Hasrita	95,037	
27 April	"Shape of You"	Ed Sheeran	374,945		"Menahan Rindu"	Wany Hasrita	95,840	
4 May	"Shape of You"	Ed Sheeran	353,510		"Menahan Rindu"	Wany Hasrita	98,652	
11 May	"Despacito (Remix)"	Luis Fonsi and Daddy Yankee ft. Justin Bieber	359,635		"Menahan Rindu"	Wany Hasrita	104,535	
18 May	"Despacito (Remix)"	Luis Fonsi and Daddy Yankee ft. Justin Bieber	406,562		"Menahan Rindu"	Wany Hasrita	101,853	
25 May	"Despacito (Remix)"	Luis Fonsi and Daddy Yankee ft. Justin Bieber	469,421		"Menahan Rindu"	Wany Hasrita	92,613	
1 June	"Despacito (Remix)"	Luis Fonsi and Daddy Yankee ft. Justin Bieber	539,287		"Menahan Rindu"	Wany Hasrita	91,519	
8 June	"Despacito (Remix)"	Luis Fonsi and Daddy Yankee ft. Justin Bieber	691,627		"Tergantung Sepi"	Haqiem Rusli	95,099	
15 June	"Despacito (Remix)"	Luis Fonsi and Daddy Yankee ft. Justin Bieber	628,889		"Tergantung Sepi"	Haqiem Rusli	85,738	
22 June	"Despacito (Remix)"	Luis Fonsi and Daddy Yankee ft. Justin Bieber	577,163		"Tergantung Sepi"	Haqiem Rusli	87,797	
29 June	"Despacito (Remix)"	Luis Fonsi and Daddy Yankee ft. Justin Bieber	459,827		"Selamat Hari Raya"	Saloma	60,469	
6 July	"Despacito (Remix)"	Luis Fonsi and Daddy Yankee ft. Justin Bieber	467,397		"Jampi"	Hael Husaini	83,112	
13 July	"Despacito (Remix)"	Luis Fonsi and Daddy Yankee ft. Justin Bieber	482,075		"Jampi"	Hael Husaini	130,527	
20 July	"Despacito (Remix)"	Luis Fonsi and Daddy Yankee ft. Justin Bieber	440,468		"Jampi"	Hael Husaini	149,801	
27 July	"Despacito (Remix)"	Luis Fonsi and Daddy Yankee ft. Justin Bieber	377,081		"Jampi"	Hael Husaini	156,731	
3 August	"Despacito (Remix)"	Luis Fonsi and Daddy Yankee ft. Justin Bieber	337,946		"Jampi"	Hael Husaini	152,090	
10 August	"Despacito (Remix)"	Luis Fonsi and Daddy Yankee ft. Justin Bieber	312,774		"Jampi"	Hael Husaini	145,195	
17 August	"Despacito (Remix)"	Luis Fonsi and Daddy Yankee ft. Justin Bieber	278,515		"Jampi"	Hael Husaini	125,283	
24 August	"Despacito (Remix)"	Luis Fonsi and Daddy Yankee ft. Justin Bieber	N/A		"Jampi"	Hael Husaini	N/A	
31 August	"Look What You Made Me Do"	Taylor Swift	520,522		"Jampi"	Hael Husaini	104,197	
7 September	"Look What You Made Me Do"	Taylor Swift	403,220		"Jampi"	Hael Husaini	93,287	
14 September	"Dusk Till Dawn"	Zayn ft. Sia	429,466		"Jampi"	Hael Husaini	93,674	
21 September	"Dusk Till Dawn"	Zayn ft. Sia	404,864		"Jampi"	Hael Husaini	93,674	
28 September	"Dusk Till Dawn"	Zayn ft. Sia	N/A		"Jampi"	Hael Husaini	N/A	
5 October	"Dusk Till Dawn"	Zayn ft. Sia	431,841		"Jampi"	Hael Husaini	84,088	
12 October	"Dusk Till Dawn"	Zayn ft. Sia	434,805		"Jampi"	Hael Husaini	85,035	
18 October	"Dusk Till Dawn"	Zayn ft. Sia	433,164		"Jampi"	Hael Husaini	80,477	
26 October	"Perfect"	Ed Sheeran	431,973		"Jampi"	Hael Husaini	75,817	
2 November	"Perfect"	Ed Sheeran	416,679		"Luluh"	Khai Bahar	71,731	
9 November	"Too Good at Goodbyes"	Sam Smith	456,754		"Sesungguhnya Aku"	Alif Satar	73,696	
16 November	"Perfect"	Ed Sheeran	528,794		"Sesungguhnya Aku"	Alif Satar	87,988	
23 November	"Perfect"	Ed Sheeran	508,664		"Sesungguhnya Aku"	Alif Satar	96,538	
30 November	"Perfect"	Ed Sheeran	463,031		"Sesungguhnya Aku"	Alif Satar	94,363	
7 December	"Perfect"	Ed Sheeran	661,904		"Pematah Hati"	Nabila Razali	127,226	
14 December	"Perfect"	Ed Sheeran	583,504		"Pematah Hati"	Nabila Razali	157,006	
21 December	"Perfect"	Ed Sheeran	584,205		"Pematah Hati"	Nabila Razali	169,773	
28 December	"Perfect"	Ed Sheeran	502,450		"Pematah Hati"	Nabila Razali	147,252	
