= I Can See Your Voice Malaysia (Malay language) season 2 =

Television game show season

I Can See Your Voice Malaysia
- Season 2
- Starring: Mark Adam; Jihan Muse; Seelan Paul
- Hosted by: Sean Lee; Shuk Sahar
- Winners: Good singers: 7; Bad singers: 6
- No. of episodes: Regular: 13; Special: 1; Overall: 14

Release
- Original network: TV3
- Original release: 23 June – 29 September 2019

Season chronology
- ← Previous; Season 1 (on NTV7) Next → Season 3

The second season of the Malaysian Malay-language television mystery music game show I Can See Your Voice Malaysia premiered on TV3 on 23 June 2019.

== Gameplay ==
=== Format ===
According to the original South Korean rules, the guest artist(s) must attempt to eliminate bad singers during its game phase. At the final performance, the last remaining mystery singer is revealed as either good or bad by means of a duet between them and one of the guest artists.

If the last remaining mystery singer is good, they will have to perform again at the encore concert; if a singer is bad, they win RM3,000.

=== Rounds ===
1. Visual round
  The guest artist is given some time to observe and examine each mystery singer based on their appearance. Afterward, a muted video of each mystery singer that reveals only 0.3 seconds of their singing voice is played as an additional hint.
2. Lip sync round
  Each mystery singer performs a lip sync to a song; good singers mime to a recording of their own, while bad singers mime to a backing track by another vocalist.
3. Rehearsal round
  Three random panelists are wearing headphones to listen to a recording of assigned mystery singer that lasts for 15 seconds. Afterward, the panelist defends the mystery singer and convince the guest artist to choose them for a final performance.
4. Evidence round
  The guest artist is presented with a video package featuring a "super fan" by one of the mystery singers.

== Episodes ==
=== Guest artists ===
Legend:
Good singer
Bad singer

Episode		Guest artist (Note: Players' notes: For the returning guest artists (who also include foreigners and former good singers), names are displayed in italics.; For the mixed groups, names who identified as bad singers are displayed in italics.)	Mystery singers (In their respective numbers and aliases)					
#	Date	Guest artist	Elimination order					Winner
#	Date	Guest artist	Visual round	Lip sync round		Rehearsal round	Evidence round	Winner
1	23 June 2019	Hael Husaini	1. Nu'aim Mubaarak Rahman; (Work it Out)	4. Nazrul Mustafa; (Come on! Have a Picnic)	2. Irdian Zulrahman; (Roll, Roll, Roll the Ball)	6. Aidil Mohd Nizam; (Sepak Takraw Champion)	5. Hazwan Ismail; (Boundary Hero)	3. Noorhapizah Napiah; Experi-women
2	30 June 2019	Khai Bahar	2. Fariq Amir Azwa; (Dimsum Princess)	3. Muizuddin Abdul Mutalib; (I'm Handsome, I Know)	1. Fuad Danish Jalani; (Transform, Exchange Again)	6. Zairul Mohd Khalis; (Go Out for a Food Trip)	4. Iza'an Abdul Talib; (Delicious Vermicelli)	5. Hakimi Yamin; Doom Doom Drum
3	7 July 2019	Nabila Razali	3. Sofea Roslan; (Ice Cream Sister)	1. Iman Troye; (Top Keyboard Acrobat)	5. Nurainaa Mazalan; (Story Exporter)	6. Nurliana Zainal; (Story Importer)	2. Diana Hanaffi; (The Painters are Coming)	4. Mina Amira; Abstinence Challenged
4	14 July 2019	Datin Alyah	2. Mu'azzam Shah Husin; (Shared Architect)	6. Siti Abdul Malik; (My Girl)	1. Iskandar Abdullah; (Chef Wan 2.0)	3. Amirah Hamizah; (Delicious Crackers)	5. Nazrie Ronie; (Flooring)	4. Zarith Ziana Sulaiman; H_{2}+O=H_{2}O
5	21 July 2019	Syamel	5. Al-Luqman Ramli; (Yah! Striker)	1. Akhmal Marzaki and Arqilah Ibrahim; (Un-ordinary Friend)	3. Aniq Hisamrudin; (Lovely Flowers)	6. Liana Syamimi and Hamizah Zarin; (M2 Girls)	4. Haziq Ridzuan; (I'm Novalis)	2. Abid Shamsuddin; Stylish Star
6	28 July 2019	Siti Sarah	3. Amirah Ariffin; (Magical Tailor)	1. Shazzwan Razmee; (Future Lecturer)	6. Thalhah Abdul Halil; (Dream Conqueror)	2. Fateha Ahmad Azhar; (Takade's Music Law)	5. Zuhair Yussof; (Stamped Quote)	4. Syamsul Yunus; Squashy Squash
7	4 August 2019	Floor 88	5. Shafique Amir; (Fit and Fast)	1. Badruzzaman Zainudin; (Mat Convoy)	6. Luqman Mohd Nizam; (Light, Land, and Water)	3. Aswan Musa; (Security Captain)	2. Aidi Azrizal Hassan; (I Wanna be a Boss)	4. Syahrul Nizam; Sunny Son
8	11 August 2019	Haqiem Rusli	1. Nursyam Amarul; (Entertainer on the Roadside)	6. Luqman Hakim Ismail; (Scissorhands)	4. Yasmeen Sufia; (Fragrant Clothes)	5. Siti Nazirah Abdul Aziz; (What do You Want to Eat?!)	2. Nurhidayah Darsun; (Mocha, Latte, Coffee Oh!)	3. Muizz Zulqarnain; Yes, Sir!
9	18 August 2019	Ella	4. Efiza Zakeri; (Hey! Is There Enough Time Left?)	3. Scuevis Joshua; (Mat Ball)	1. Ainil Hawa Safiah Esa; (Obstacle Barrier)	2. Aishah Mohd Hassan; (Barbecue Queen)	6. Melissa Anne Jude; (The Business was Successful)	5. Amirul Othman; Malaysian Architecture
10	25 August 2019	Sam (Bunkface)	1. Fildza Iskandar; (Click Clicker)	3. Nur Farhana Naharin; (Queen of the Patient's Heart)	6. Faiz Jainudin; (Made in Malaysia)	5. Anis Athilah Hishamudin; (Squid Day Breaker)	4. Ekhwan Hakimi Latiff; (Weasel King)	2. Alif Mohd Daud; It's Showtime! For Me...
11	1 September 2019	Ajai	4. Azzim Saidon; (MMA Fanatic)	3. Muaz Ziekif Zulkifli; (It's a Petite but... It's Romantic)	2. Yaaqub Mahmood; (I'm so Cute! Meow! Meow!)	5. Ermizi Muhammad; (Truth Defender)	1. Noraisah Zakariya; (Maths Genius)	6. Shafiq Ismail; 3. 2. 1. Action!
12	8 September 2019	Mas Idayu	2. Fazril Ariffin; (Mr. No Problem)	3. Nasrullah Abdul Ghani; (That Popiah Wasn't Ordinary)	4. Mimi Ridzuan; (Nostalgic Legend)	1. Faiqah Chik; (Food Artist)	5. Khairul Suhaimi; (Teh Tarik One)	6. Norafheda Madrigal; The Most Beautiful Melody
13	15 September 2019	Mark Adam	6. Elnissa Aziz; (3D Animation Expert)	3. Firdaus Abidin; (Dream Throne)	2. Nurfitri Halimi; (E-lamp Science)	5. Afiq Ab Molok; (Rojak King)	4. Darell Unding Senelus; (Holiday Drawings)	1. Nashalia Nasriadi; Error 404

=== Panelists ===
Legend:
Regular panelist
Guest panelist

Apps		Panelists in attendance (Sorted by first appearance, with episode designations)
g#	p#	Panelists in attendance (Sorted by first appearance, with episode designations)
13	1	Seelan Paul (1–13)
12	2	Mark Adam (1–12); Jihan Muse (1–4, 6–13)
1	28	Haziq Hussni and Azira Shafinaz (1); Ismail Izzani and Intan Najuwa (2); Amelia Thripura Henderson and Shafieq Shazwan (3); Awal Ashaari and Marsha Milan (4); Wany Hasrita, Fizie Roslan, and Hefny Sahad (5); Remy Ishak and Janna Nick (6); Fatin Afeefa and Sherry Alhadad (7); Fadlan Hazim and Bell Ngasri (8); Amy Mastura and Mizal Zaini (9); Dayah Bakar and Shuib Sepahtu (10); Kak Girl and Sufian Suhaimi (11); Aman Ra and Elly Mazlein (12); Anis Nabilah, Lisa Surihani, and Nad Zainal (13)

== Encore Concert (29 September 2019) ==
Also in this season, a second encore concert was held two weeks after its final game, featuring some of invited mystery singers return to perform one last time; Andi Bernadee, Luqman Faiz, Ara Johari, and Misha Omar made their guesting appearances. However, a music video for Mu'izz Zulqarnain's single "Andai Nanti" was teased at the closing credits.

I Can See Your Voice Malaysia season 2 — Encore Concert performances
Performer(s)	Song(s)
Medley
Mu'izz Zulqarnain	"Love Fever" (Demam Cinta) — Halkai Farid feat. Asfan Shah
Amirul Othman	"Ray" (Sinar) — Megat Rahim
Zarith Ziana Sulaiman	"Everyone Already" (Semua Sudah) — Elizabeth Tan
Norafheda Madrigal	"I'm Leaving" (Aku Pergi) — Cita Citata
Sofea Roslan	"Eyeball" (Main Mata) — Baby Shima
Mina Amira	"If So" (Seandainya) — Brisia Jodie
Hakimi Yamin	"Return" (Pulang) — Insomniacks
Syamsul Yunus	"Yesterday" (Kemarin) — Seventeen
All winners	"Last Night" (Semalam Sehaja) — E1
Solo performances
Syamsul Yunus	"I Beg You" (Ku Mohon) — Afgansyah Reza
Sofea Roslan	"Missing" (Hilang) — Marsha Milan
Mu'izz Zulqarnain	"For You" (Untuk Kamu) — Nastia
Norafheda Madrigal	"Stay In My Soul" (Tetap Dalam Jiwa) — Isyana Sarasvati
Duet performances
Luqman Faiz and Amirul Othman	"Your Madness" (Kepuraanmu) — Luqman Faiz
Ara Johari and Mina Amira	"Flower" (Bunga) — Ara Johari
Andy Bernadee and Hakimi Yamin	"Only a Chance" (Satu Peluang) — Andy Bernadee
Misha Omar and Zarith Ziana Sulaiman	"Till When?" (Sampai Bila) — Misha Omar
