= The Masked Singer Malaysia season 4 =

The Masked Singer Malaysia
- Season 4
- Presented by: Dato' AC Mizal
- No. of contestants: 13 (Solo); 2 (Paired)
- Winner: Bunga Matahari (Stacy Anam)
- Runner-up: Mat Helang (Namie Smy)
- Location: CIDB Convention Center, Kuala Lumpur
- No. of episodes: 10

Release
- Original network: Astro Warna; Astro Ria (Weeks 1 & 2 only)
- Original release: 17 December 2023 – 18 February 2024

Season chronology
- ← Previous; TMSMY 3 (2022/23) Next → TMSMY 5 (Not Known)

The fourth season of the series The Masked Singer Malaysia has been broadcast live and aired through Astro Warna on December 17, 2023 until February 18, 2024. Season 4

== Hosts & Jury ==
Dato' AC Mizal is once again entrusted to host The Masked Singer Malaysia this fourth season.

=== Permanent judges ===
No	Celebrity	Occupation	Episode
1	Datuk Aznil Hj Nawawi	TV Host, Singer, Actor, Writer, Radio Presenter	
2	Michael Ang	Director, Producer, Actor, Scriptwriter	
3	Zizan Razak	Comedian, Actor, TV Host, Singer, Businessman	
4	Nabila Huda	Actress, TV Host, Model	
5	Angah	Comedian, Actress, Lawyer, Radio Presenter	
6	Sherry Alhadad	Comedian, Actress, TV Host	
7	Rozita Che Wan	Actress, Comedian, TV Host, Producer	
8	Elly Mazlein	Singer, Actress, Comedian, TV Host, Radio Host	
9	Erra Fazira	Actor, Singer, TV Host, Producer	

=== Guest Jury ===
No	Celebrity	Occupation	Episode	Notes
1	Fattah Amin	Actor, Singer, Host, Model & Entrepreneur Ambassador	Episode 2	Replacing Erra Fazira

== Contestants and Elimination ==
Position	Stage name	Celebrity	Occupation	Week									
Position	Stage name	Celebrity	Occupation	1	2	3	4	5	6	7	8	9	10
1	Bunga Matahari	Stacy Anam	Singer, Composer, Lyricist & Fantasia Academy Season 6 Champion	SAFE	SAFE	WIN	WIN	WIN	WIN	WIN	WIN	WIN	WINNER
2	Mat Helang	Namie Smy	Actor, Comedian, Singer, Radio Presenter & Champion of Muzikal Lawak Superstar 3 with the Ubi group	SAFE	SAFE	SAFE	RISK	RISK	SAFE	SAFE	RISK	RISK	RUNNER-UP
3	Sang Kancil	Danial Zaini	Comedian, actor, singer, lyricist, host, radio presenter, Solo Funny Winner, Muzikal Funny Superstar 2 Winner with the group Heart & Maharaja Funny Mega 2021 Winner with the group Tiro	WIN	SAFE	SAFE	SAFE	SAFE	SAFE	SAFE	SAFE	SAFE	THIRD
4	Biskut Aiskrim	Adinda Tasya (Ceria Popstar)	Singer	SAFE	SAFE	SAFE	SAFE	SAFE	SAFE	RISK	SAFE	SAFE	FINALIST
5	Teratai	Nabila Razali	Singer, actress & host	SAFE	SAFE	SAFE	SAFE	SAFE	SAFE	RISK	RISK	RISK	FINALIST
6	Roti John	Hun Haqeem	Actress, model & host	SAFE	WIN	SAFE	SAFE	SAFE	SAFE	SAFE	SAFE	OUT	
7	Musang	Datuk Yusry Abdul Halim	Member of the KRU Group, actor, director, composer, writer & producer	SAFE	SAFE	SAFE	SAFE	SAFE	SAFE	RISK	SAFE	OUT	
8	Bawang Putih	Noki K-Clique	Member of the K-Clique Group	SAFE	SAFE	SAFE	SAFE	SAFE	RISK	OUT			
9	Abang Jagung	Azan Addin	Member of the Ruffedge Group	RISK	SAFE	SAFE	SAFE	SAFE	RISK	OUT			
10	Pom Pom Kin	Amelina	Queen of Dangdut Malaysia	SAFE	RISK	RISK	OUT						
11	Ikan Emas	Daiyan Trisha	Singer, actor, host, songwriter & lyricist	SAFE	SAFE	RISK	OUT						
12	Putera Katak	Rashidi Ishak	Actor, musician, host & director	SAFE	RISK	OUT							
13	Cili Padi	Amira Othman (Red) & Irfan Haris (Green)	Singer & Lyricist	RISK	OUT								
14	Kak Cat	Soo Wincci	Senior Lecturer, Singer, Actress & Miss Malaysia 2008	OUT									

The masked singer won first place and remained in the competition.
The masked singer survived elimination and was not in the bottom three
The masked singer was in the bottom three but was not eliminated.
The masked singer was eliminated from the competition and her identity was revealed after their elimination.

== Episodes ==
=== Week 1 (17 December 2023) ===
Performances by position
No	Mascot	Song	Original Singer	Identity	Result
1	Sang Kancil	Laskar Cinta	Dewa 19	unknown	WIN
2	Roti John	Bintang Di Surga	Peterpan	unknown	SAFE
3	Ikan Emas	I Am The Best	2NE1	unknown	SAFE
4	Mat Helang	Mentera Semerah Padi	M. Nasir	unknown	SAFE
5	Teratai	Oops!...I Did It Again	Britney Spears	unknown	SAFE
6	Bunga Matahari	Dance Monkey	Tones and I	unknown	SAFE
7	Biskut Aiskrim	Nuri	Ella	unknown	SAFE
8	Fox	Aladin	Spider	unknown	SAFE
9	Putera Katak	Creep	Radiohead	unknown	SAFE
10	Pom Pom Kin	Jahat	Stacy	unknown	SAFE
11	Bawang Putih	Santai	Faizal Tahir	unknown	SAFE
12	Abang Jagung	Joget Mak Enon	Carefree	unknown	RISK
13	Cili Padi	Cari Jodoh	Wali	unknown	RISK
14	Kak Cat	Pelukan Angkasa	Shila Amzah feat S.O.G	Soo Wincci	ELIMINATED

- MASKED-terful Of The Week:

=== Week 2 (24 December 2023) ===
Performances by rank
No	Mascot	Song	Original Singer	Identity	Results
1	Roti John	Feeling Good	Michael Bublé	unknown	WIN
2	Bunga Matahari	Trauma	Elite	unknown	SAFE
3	Mat Helang	Test Drive	Firdaus Rahmat	unknown	SAFE
4	Musang	Bunga Angkasa	Terra Rossa	unknown	SAFE
5	Ikan Emas	Malampagi	Saixese	unknown	SAFE
6	Sang Kancil	Nour El Ain	Amr Diab	unknown	SAFE
7	Abang Jagung	Uptown Girl	Westlife	unknown	SAFE
8	Bawang Putih	Shimmy	Andi Bernadee	unknown	SAFE
9	Teratai	Kisah Hati	Alyah	unknown	SAFE
10	Biskut Aiskrim	Irama	Shiha Zikir	unknown	SAFE
11	Pom Pom Kin	Joget Sayang Disayang	Anita Sarawak	unknown	RISK
12	Putera Katak	Di Alam Fana Cinta	Fotograf	unknown	RISK
13	Cili Padi	Pening	Datuk M. Daud Kilau & Ezlynn	Amira Othman & Irfan Haris	ELIMINATED

- MASKED-terful Of The Week:

=== Week 3 (31 December 2023)(Movie Night) ===
Performances by position
No	Mascot	Song	Original Singer	Identity	Results
1	Bunga Matahari	Bila Cinta	Gio	unknown	WIN
2	Sang Kancil	Aankhein Khuli	Lata Mangeshkar & Udit Narayan	unknown	SAFE
3	Bawang Putih	Berhenti Berharap	Sheila On 7	unknown	SAFE
4	Mat Helang	Sedetik Lebih	Anuar Zain	unknown	SAFE
5	Roti John	Cinta Sejati	Bunga Citra Lestari	unknown	SAFE
6	Teratai	Asmaradana	Tiara Jacquelina	unknown	SAFE
7	Abang Jagung	Keluang Man	Krisya	unknown	SAFE
8	Biskut Aiskrim	Kau Di Hatiku	Dato' Zainal Abidin	unknown	SAFE
9	Musang	Footloose	Kenny Loggins	unknown	SAFE
10	Ikan Emas	Dance The Night	Dua Lipa	unknown	RISK
11	Pom Pom Kin	Cari Tapak	Senario	unknown	RISK
12	Putera Katak	(Everything I Do) I Do It For You	Bryan Adams	Rashidi Ishak	ELIMINATED

- MASKED-terful Of The Week:

=== Week 4 (7 January 2024) ===
Performances by position
No	Mascot	Song	Original Singer	Identity	Results
1	Bunga Matahari	Depresi	IamNEETA	unknown	WIN
2	Sang Kancil	Mama Papa Larang	Judika	unknown	SAFE
3	Biskut Aiskrim	Gila	Kaka Azraff, Loca B & Noki	unknown	SAFE
4	Musang	Teman	XPDC	unknown	SAFE
5	John's bread	Always Be My Baby	Mariah Carey	unknown	SAFE
6	Bawang Putih	Gadis Melayu	Jamal Abdillah	unknown	SAFE
7	Teratai	Untuk Terakhir Kali	Marsha Milan	unknown	SAFE
8	Abang Jagung	Take On Me	A-ha	unknown	SAFE
9	Mat Helang	Cinta Sampai Ke Euthopia	Ria Resty Fauzy	unknown	RISK
10	Pom Pom Kin	Tamparan Wanita	Elite	unknown	RISK
11	Ikan Emas	Sial	Mahalini	Daiyan Trisya	ELIMINATED

- MASKED-terful Of The Week:

=== Week 5 (14 January 2024)(Night Dato' Sri Siti Nurhaliza) ===
Performances by position
No	Mascot	Song	Identity	Results
1	Bunga Matahari	Dialah Di Hati	unknown	WIN
2	Sang Kancil	Ya Maulai	unknown	SAFE
3	Biskut Aiskrim	Cindai	unknown	SAFE
4	Bawang Putih	Purnama Merindu	unknown	SAFE
5	Roti John	Aku Cinta Padamu	unknown	SAFE
6	Musang	Jerat Percintaan	unknown	SAFE
7	Teratai	Ku Milikmu	unknown	SAFE
8	Mat Helang	Ku Mahu	unknown	RISK
9	Abang Jagung	Lakaran Hidup	unknown	RISK
10	Pom Pom Kin	Anta Permana	Amelina	ELIMINATED

- MASKED-terful Of The Week: Roti John

=== Week 6 (21 January 2024) ===
Performances by position
No	Mascot	Song	Original Singer	Identity	Results
1	Bunga Matahari	Kau Atau Aku	Elyana	unknown	WIN
2	Ice Cream Biscuits	Time is Running Out	Muse	unknown	SAFE
3	Roti John	Umpan Jinak Di Air Tenang	Ahmad Jais	unknown	SAFE
4	Teratai	Kemaafan Tenang Yang Terindah	Aishah	unknown	SAFE
5	Sang Kancil	Ibu Kota Cinta	Def Gab C	unknown	SAFE
6	Mat Helang	Tiara	Kris	unknown	SAFE
7	Musang	Livin' on a Prayer	Bon Jovi	unknown	RISK
8	Bawang Putih	Itu Kamu	Estranged	unknown	RISK
9	Abang Jagung	Harus Terpisah	Cakra Khan	Azan Addin	ELIMINATED

- MASKED-terful Of The Week:Mat Helang

=== Week 7 (28 January 2024)(Go Malaysia Go) ===
Performances by position
No	Mascot	Song	Original Singer	Identity	Results
1	Bunga Matahari	Hanya Di Mercu	Ayu Damit	unknown	WIN
2	Musang	Negaraku	Faizal Tahir, Joe Flizzow, Altimet & SonaOne	unknown	SAFE
3	Roti John	Fire & Water	Faizal Tahir	unknown	SAFE
4	Mat Helang	Telinga Ke Tulang	Spider	unknown	SAFE
5	Sang Kancil	You Raise Me Up	Josh Groban	unknown	SAFE
6	Biskut Aiskrim	Pelita	A.P.I	unknown	RISK
7	Teratai	Semangat Yang Hilang	XPDC	unknown	RISK
8	Bawang Putih	Flashlight	Jessie J	Noki K-Clique	ELIMINATED

- MASKED-terful Of The Week: Teratai

=== Week 8 (4 February 2024) ===
Performances by position
No	Mascot	Song	Original Singer	Identity	Results
1	Bunga Matahari	Run The World (Girls)	Beyonce	unknown	WIN
2	Sang Kancil	Mahakarya Cinta	Faizal Tahir	unknown	SAFE
3	Biskut Aiskrim	Terus Hidup	Aina Abdul	unknown	SAFE
4	Roti John	Bunga	Altimet	unknown	SAFE
5	Mat Helang	Meniti Titian Usang	Search	unknown	RISK
6	Teratai	I Will Go To You Like The First Snow	Ailee	unknown	RISK
7	Musang	Warisan Wanita Terakhir	Teacher's Pet	Datuk Yusry Abdul Halim	ELIMINATED

- MASKED-terful Of The Week: Biskut Aiskrim

=== Week 9 (11 February 2024)(Rock Double Trouble) ===
Performances by position
No	Mascot	Song	Original Singer	Identity	Results
1	Bunga Matahari	Sejati	Wings	unknown	WIN
2	Sang Kancil	Di Ambang Wati	Wings	unknown	SAFE
3	Biskut Aiskrim	Ukiran Jiwa	Awie	unknown	SAFE
4	Mat Helang	Nur Nilam Sari	Awie & Search	unknown	RISK
5	Teratai	Taman Rashidah Utama	Wings	unknown	RISK
6	Roti John	Rozana	Search	Hun Haqeem	ELIMINATED

No	Mascot	Song	Original Singer
1.	Teratai vs Mat Helang	Ingatkan Dia	Wings
2.	Roti John vs Sang Kancil	Laila Namamu Teratas	Search
3	Bunga Matahari vs Biskut Aiskrim	Mentari Merah Di Ufuk Timur	Search

- MASKED-terful Of The Week: Biskut Aiskrim Bunga Matahari

=== Week 10 (18 February 2024) ===
Performances by position
No	Mascot	Song (Round 1)	Original Singer	Song (Round 2)	Original Singer	Identity	Results
1	Bunga Matahari	Lathi	Weird Genius Feat. Sara Fajira	Love	Marsha Milan	Stacy Anam	WINNER
2	Mat Helang	Biarkanlah	Drama Band	Aku Skandal	Hujan	Namie	RUNNER-UP
3	Sang Kancil	Tiga Malam Tanpa Bintang	Fiq Halim	Aduh Saliha	Mawi	Danial Zaini	THIRD
4	Biskut Aiskrim	Dondang Dendang	Noraniza Idris	Skyfall	Adele	Adinda Tasya	FINALIST
5	Teratai	Damelo	Dolla	It's All Coming Back To Me Now	Celine Dion	Nabila Razali	FINALIST

- MASKED-terful Of The Week: Bunga Matahari

== See also ==
- The Masked Singer Malaysia
- The Masked Singer Malaysia (season 1)
- The Masked Singer Malaysia (season 2)
- The Masked Singer Malaysia (season 3)
- The Masked Singer Malaysia Reunion
