= Amira Othman =

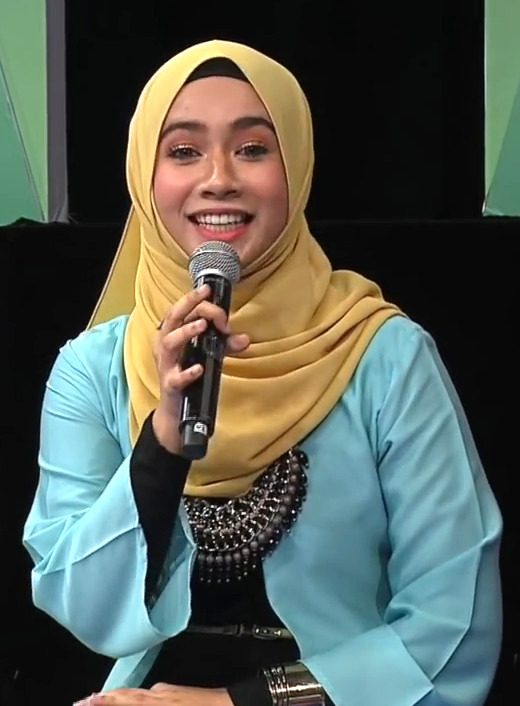
- Amira was interviewed on the show MeleTOP on Astro Ria on 29 March 2016.
- Born: Nadia Amirah binti Othman; 26 October 1993 (age 32); Skudai, Johor Bahru, Johor, Malaysia
- Education: MARA University of Technology (UiTM)
- Occupations: Singer; Actress; Host Television
- Years active: 2013–present
- Spouse: Fattah Amin (m. 2025)
- Children: 1
- Relatives: Irfan Haris (brother); Haikal Iskandar (brother)
- Musical career
- Genres: Pop; R&B; ballad
- Instrument: Vocal
- Labels: FMC Music; Musica Studios (Indonesia); Seventeen Eleven Music; Rocketfuel Entertainment
- Formerly of: The Lomas

Nadia Amira binti Othman (born 26 October 1993) is a Malaysian singer, host and actress. She is a former student of Akademi Fantasia season 10 in 2013 where she won third place.

In 2015, she released a second single, "Hati-Hati" with Faizul Sany, Hael Husaini and Mike Chan. In addition, Amira was once the host of the show Nasi Lemak Kopi O on TV9.

== Career ==
Amira Othman was selected as one of the participants and students in Akademi Fantasia season 10 (AF2013), along with Nabila Razali, Indah Ruhaila, Hael Husaini and Faizul Sany. After 10 weeks of performing at the AF2013 concert, she managed to win fifth place. The following is a list of her performances at AF2013:

1. Week 1: "Ratuku" originally sung by Awie
2. Week 2: "Pastikan" originally sung by Siti Nurhaliza
3. Week 3: "Getaran Jiwa" originally sung by P. Ramlee
4. Week 4: "Ya Maulai" original song by Siti Nurhaliza
5. Week 5: "Skyfall" original song by Adele
6. Week 6: "Terima Kasih" original song by iamNEETA
7. Week 7: "Mendung Tak Beerti Hujan" (duet with Hazama Azmi) original song by Deddy Dores and Ella
8. Week 8: "Awan Yang Terpilu" original song by Ning Baizura
9. Week 9: "Tak Mungkin Kerna Sayang" original song by Alyah and "Opera Hidup" original song by Wings
10. Week 10: "Terlalu Istimewa" original song by Adibah Noor and "Sesaat Untukku" (new song)

After the end of AF2013, Amira recorded a song titled "Hati-Hati" by Faizul Sany, Hael Husaini and Mike Chan, which was released in 2015. In the same year, she formed the group The Lomas which was also joined by fellow fighters Aisyah Aziz, Indah Ruhaila and Nabila Razali. The group has released 2 singles so far, "Bila Larut Malam" and "Rindu".

Her acting career began by starring alongside Singaporean actor Hisyam Hamid in the drama adaptation of the novel Abang Bomba I Love You, playing the role of Lily. Her third single, "Jaga-jaga" was used as the OST for the drama she acted in. She then acted in the drama Red Velvet starring alongside Alif Satar and Neelofa playing the role of Suhaila.

In February 2018, Amira released her fifth single, "Mimpi Indah". Its music video has garnered 60,000 views on YouTube since its official launch and the number of views has increased to 800,000 views as of May 2018.

She and Sufian Suhaimi contributed voices to the soundtrack of the film Motif entitled "Takkan Merubah" narrated by Farouk Roman and Amylea Azizan. The music video was directed by Nadiah Hamzah.

Amira will appear with Wany Hasrita in a show titled ICU produced by the sharia-compliant streaming platform, Nurflix. She then released her latest single, "Surat Akhir", which became the theme song for the drama Marry Me Senorita. She also contributed to the OST of the drama Malaysian Ghost Stories entitled "Tragedi".

She started 2024 by releasing her single entitled "Sampan Mimpi", produced by Amir Jahari. Then, in October 2024, she also contributed her voice to the OST of Pinjaman Syurga entitled "Melewati Mimpi".

"Bila Nak Kahwin?" is the latest release from Amira Othman for 2025, and she also contributed ideas for the production of the song's lyrics alongside composers Omar K and Iqie Hugh.

== Personal life ==
Amira was born and raised in Skudai, Johor and has six siblings.

After graduating from AF2013, Amira continued her studies for a diploma in music at Universiti Teknologi MARA (UiTM) Shah Alam, with a degree in classical vocals. She is also the older sister of two young singers, Irfan Haris and Haikal Iskandar.

She is friends with Nabila Razali, from when they both participated in AF2013. She is also friends with Wany Hasrita.

She married Malaysian actor and singer Fattah Amin on 14 September 2025.

== Discography ==
=== Singles ===
Year	Title	Collaboration	Lyricist	Composer	Position				Note
Year	Title	Collaboration	Lyricist	Composer	Era Fm	Hot FM	Muzik Muzik	JOOX	Note
2013	Sesaat Untukku	—	Erda EE	Keroz Nazri	—	—	—	—	
2015	Hati-Hati	—	Hael Husaini & Faizul Sany	Hael Husaini, Faizul Sany & Mike Chan	—	—	—	—	
2016	Biar Masa	Raqib	—		—	—	—	—	
2016	Jaga-Jaga	—	Ezra Kong, Ayden Ali & Faizul Sany		—	—	—	—	OST Drama Abang Bomba I Love You
2018	Mimpi Indah	—	Hael Husaini		—	—	—	—	
2019	Sambil	Irfan Haris	Ubaidillah	Haiqal Iskandar & Irfan Haris	—	—	—	—	OST Drama Jodoh-Jodoh Annisa
2019	Takkan Merubah	Sufian Suhaimi	Amylea Azizan	Farouk Roman	—	—	—	—	OST Filem Motif
2020	Surat Akhir	—	Syafiq Rashid		—	—	—	—	OST Drama Marry Me Senorita
2021	Tragedi	—	Amira Othman	Sharon Paul	—	—	—	—	OST Drama Malaysian Ghost Stories
2022	Alah Bisa	Faizal Tahir	Glow Rush, Faizal Tahir, Nick Ariff, Acap Salim & Mage		—	—	—	—	
2024	Sampan Mimpi	—	Amir Jahari		—	—	—	—	
2025	Bila Nak Kahwin?	—	Amira Othman, Iqie Hugh & Omar K		—	—	—	—	
2025	Rasa & Takdir	Irfan Haris	Syafiq Rashid		—	—	—	—	

== Filmography ==
=== Movies ===
Year	Title	Character	Notes
2019	Tiada Tajuk	Cahaya	First film

=== Drama ===
Year	Title	Character	TV channel	Notes
2016	Abang Bomba I Love You	Lily	Astro Ria	First drama
2017	Red Velvet	Suhaila	Astro Ria	
2018	Misteri Jenazah	Zainab	Astro Prima	Episode 8: Revenge of a Soul
2019	Patah Sayap Bertongkat Paruh	Ros	Astro Ria	

=== Telefilm ===
Year	Title	Character	TV Channel	Notes
2016	Sepahtu Kisah Tauladan	Mira	Astro Ria	First telefilm
2017	Abang Bomba I Love You Raya	Lily	Astro Ria	
2018	30 Hari Membunuh Cinta	Dada		
2025	Ustaz G Major	Ustazah Syarifah	Astro Ria	

=== Television ===
Year	Title	As	TV Channel	Notes
2015	Sepahtu Reunion 2015	Cikgu Kaunseling	Astro Warna	Guest Artist: Episode "Budak Nakal"
2016	Nasi Lemak Kopi O	Host	TV9	
2017	Nasi Lemak Kopi O	Host	TV9	24 February 2017; host with Talib Husin
2018	Miss Stylo	Host	TV2	
2019	Sepahtu Reunion Al-Puasa	Mariam	Astro Warna	Guest Artist: Episode "Duit Raya Nak Raya"
2024	The Masked Singer Malaysia (season 4)	Participants as Chili Padi Red	Astro Warna	with Irfan Haris (Chili Padi Hijau)
2024–present	Sembang Sahur	Host	TV3	

== Awards and nominations ==
Year	Award	Category	Nomination	Results
2018	Daily Newspaper Popular Star Award 2017	Popular Female TV Actress	Amira Othman	Nominated
