= Aisyah Aziz =

Singaporean singer

Aisyah Aziz عايشه عزيز (Jawi)
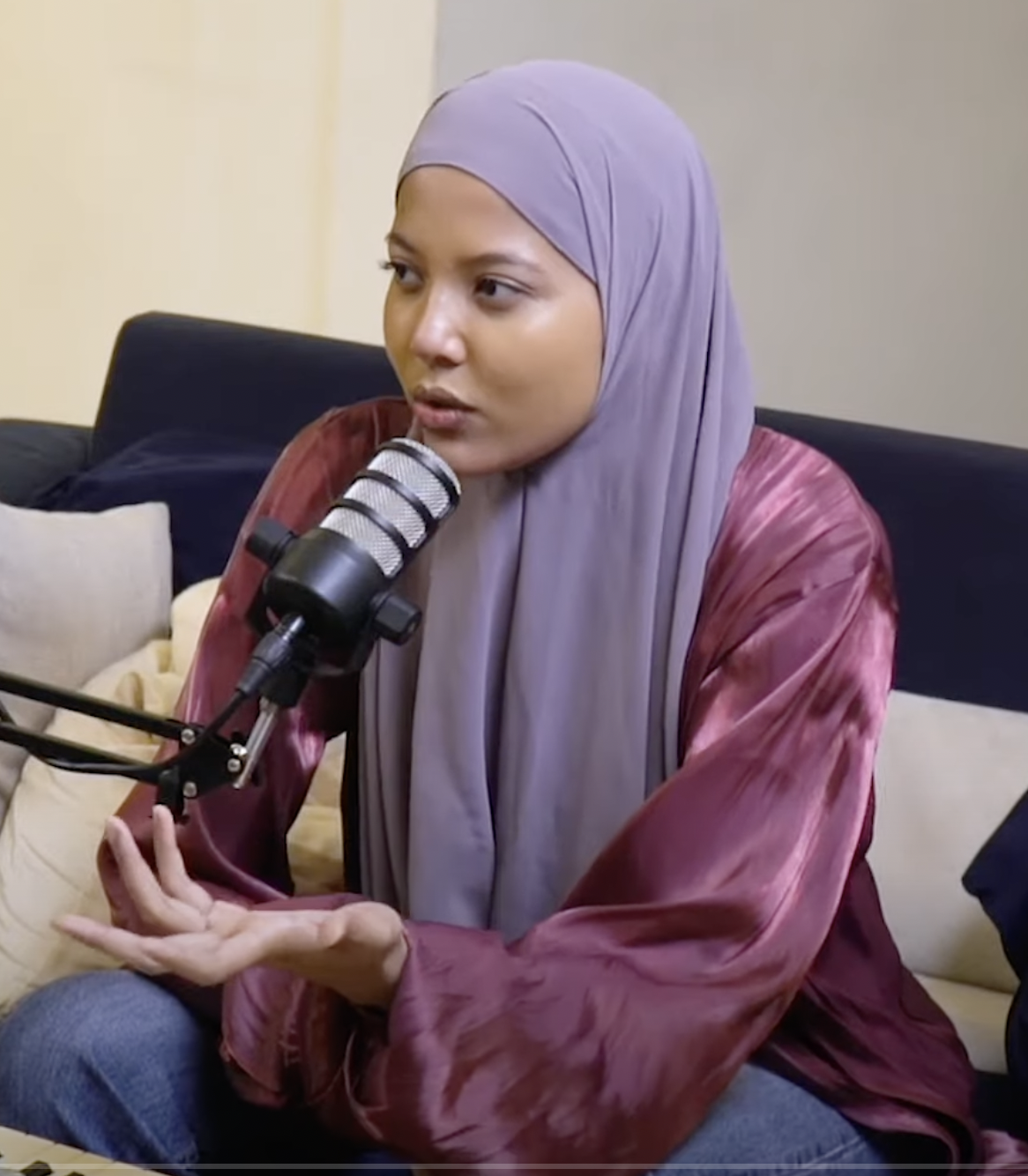
- Aisyah Aziz in 2024
- Born: Nur Aishah Binte Aziz; 21 May 1994 (age 32); Singapore
- Occupations: Singer; Songwriter; Actress
- Spouse: Dr. Mohd Fakhrudin Amir Mohd Ismail (m. 2025)
- Relatives: Aliff Aziz (brother)
- Musical career
- Genres: Pop, Ballad, Jazz
- Years active: 2013–present
- Formerly of: The Lomas

Nur Aisyah binte Aziz (Jawi: نور عايشه بنت عزيز; born 21 May 1994) better known by her stage name Aisyah Aziz is a Singaporean singer-songwriter and actress.

She came in sixth place on the tenth season of the Malaysian singing reality show, Akademi Fantasia. She is the younger sister of Singaporean actor and singer, Aliff Aziz.

== Early life ==
Aisyah Aziz was born in Singapore on 21 May 1994, into a Malay family of mixed Arab ancestry. She has an older brother, Aliff, an actor and singer based in Malaysia, and a twin sister, Nur Ain.

She attended Zhenghua Secondary School with her older brother, she filmed an episode of Zaman Sekolah 2 at the school.

== Career ==
Aisyah started taking part in singing competitions at age 11. At 19, Aisyah participated in the popular singing reality show Akademi Fantasia season 10 in 2013, reaching the finals and finishing in sixth. Her debut single, "Mimpi", produced by Faizal Tahir and Omar K. was first performed during the Akademi Fantasia finals. In the wake of Akademi Fantasia, in 2015, Aisyah formed the short-lived Malay girl group, The Lomas, with fellow Akademi Fantasia alumni Amira Othman, Nabila Razali, and Indah Ruhaila. The Lomas released two singles together "Bila Larut Malam" and "Rindu".

In 2017, Aisyah was nominated for nine awards at Anugerah Planet Muzik, she became the first Singaporean to win Best APM song at Anugerah Planet Muzik, for the song "Senyum Saja". She won two other awards on the night, Best Song (Singapore) for "Senyum Saja" and Best Collaboration (Song) for "Tanda Tanya".

Aisyah left her Malaysian record label, Rocketfuel Entertainment in 2019, becoming an independent artist based in Singapore.

She released her first English single, "Sugar" on 10 January 2020. Her debut EP of the same name, Sugar (The Live Extended Play), was initially released as a video on YouTube, in February, before being released on streaming platforms. The EP marked her first foray into songwriting, she wrote the EP with her songwriting partner, Harun Amirrul Rasyid Mohamed.

In June 2022, Aisyah made her theatre acting debut in Bangsawan Gemala Malam at the Victoria Theatre.

== Artistry ==
=== Influences ===
Aisyah grew up with listening to Malay songs, and has cited P. Ramlee, Saloma, and Anita Sarawak as influences. Among Western artists she cites Amy Winehouse, Aerosmith, Ella Fitzgerald, Celine Dion, Christina Aguilera, and Mariah Carey as artists who have influenced her and helped shape her sound.

== Personal life ==
=== Health ===
In 2017, Aisyah was diagnosed with muscle tension dysphonia, which prevented her from singing for a year.

=== Religion ===
In 2023, Aisyah began veiling herself, as part of her faith journey. She performed the umrah pilgrimage in January 2024.

=== Relationships ===
Aisyah married Dr. Mohd Fakhrudin Amir Mohd Ismail in Singapore on 11 April 2025. Fakhrudin Amir is the elder brother of Malaysian televangelist and actor, Haris Ismail (better known as PU Riz) and brother-in-law to model-turned-entrepreneur and media personality Neelofa.

== Discography ==
=== Studio albums ===
| Title | Album details | Track listing |
|---|---|---|
| Pearls | Released: 10 September 2021; Label: Groove Note; Format: CD, LP, digital download, streaming | List: 1. "Wicked Game"; 2. "Wonderful"; 3. "Pearls"; 4. "Walk on the Wild Side"; 5. "Killing Me Softly"; 6. "Purple Rain"; 7. "High & Dry"; 8. "Bellyache"; 9. "Like a Star"; 10. "Knocking on Heaven's Door"; 11. "Smile"; 12. "Wicked Game (Audiophile Mix)" |

=== Extended plays ===
| Title | EP details | Track listing |
|---|---|---|
| Sugar (The Live Extended Play) | Released: 20 February 2020; Label: Independent; Format: Digital download, streaming | List: 1. "Tame Me" (Live); 2. "Escape" (Live); 3. "Love Like This" (Live); 4. "Chasing Destruction" (Live); 5. "Sugar" (Live) |

=== Singles ===
==== As lead artist ====
| Title | Year | Album |
|---|---|---|
| "Mimpi" | 2014 | AF2013 |
| "Pilihan Sejati" | 2015 | Non-album single |
| "Cahaya Aidilfitri" | 2016 | #Rayakustik |
| "Tanda Tanya" | 2016 | Non-album singles |
| "Bila Entah" | 2019 | Non-album singles |
| "Say Yes To Waste Less" | 2019 | Non-album singles |
| "Sugar" | 2020 | Sugar (The Live Extended Play) |
| "Loving Room" | 2020 | Non-album singles |
| "Spirits Anew" | 2021 | Non-album singles |
| "Utopia Reimagined: Euphoria" | 2021 | Non-album singles |
| "janji kita bertemu lagi" | 2023 | Non-album singles |
| "damai" | 2023 | Non-album singles |

==== Collaborations ====
| Title | Year | Peak chart positions | Album |
| Title | Year | MYS | Album |
| Title | Year | RIM | Album |
|---|---|---|---|
| "Pulanglah" with Ayda Jebat | 2016 | — | #Rayakustik |
| "Senyum Saja" with Haikal Ali | 2017 | — | Non-album singles |
| "We Are Singapore - NDP 2018 Theme Song" with various artists | 2018 | — | Non-album singles |
| "Indah Pada Waktunya" with Rizky Febian | 2018 | — | Non-album singles |
| "Someone Else" with Lil J | 2020 | — | Non-album singles |
| "Abadi Kita" with Dennis Lau | 2020 | — | Non-album singles |
| "Won't You Come Around" with Charlie Lim | 2021 | — | Non-album singles |
| "Hopelessly Devoted To You" with YAØ | 2021 | — | Non-album singles |
| "West Side Story" with Haven, Joie Tan, RIIDEM | 2021 | — | Hometown Heroes |
| "Mimpi Ngeri" with Ahmadul Amin | 2022 | — | Non-album single |
| "Pujaanku" with Masdo | 2023 | 2 | Non-album single |
"—" denotes a recording that did not chart or was not released in that territory.

==== As featured artist ====
List of singles as featured artist, showing year released, and album name
| Title | Year | Album |
|---|---|---|
| "uTopia reimagined: chasing" (ShiGGa Shay feat. Aisyah Aziz) | 2021 | Non-album single |

==== Soundtrack appearances ====
| Title | Year | Album |
|---|---|---|
| "Bukalah Matamu" with Bunga | 2019 | Ejen Ali: The Movie OST |
| "Love Me" | 2019 | Roar! The Lion City Unmuzzled OST |
| "Lara" | 2020 | Cinta Itu Fairytale OST |

==== Guest appearances ====
List of non-single guest appearances, showing year released and album name
| Title | Year | Album |
|---|---|---|
| "Mungkin" (Altimet feat. Aisyah Aziz) | 2018 | O |

== Filmography ==
=== Television ===
| Year | Title | Role | Network | Notes | Ref. |
|---|---|---|---|---|---|
| 2013 | Akademi Fantasia | Contestant | Astro Ria | Ep. 1–50 | |
| 2016 | Diari Fantasia | Contestant | Astro Ria | Episode: "Istimewa Aman" | |
| 2016 | My Squad Is Better Than Yours | Contestant | Mediacorp | Singaporean reality show | |
| 2016 | Zaman Sekolah 2 | Herself | Mediacorp Suria | | |
| 2016 | Sinar Lebaran 2016 | Performer | Mediacorp Suria | | |
| 2017 | Sinar Lebaran 2017 | Performer | Mediacorp Suria | | |
| 2017 | 2017 Mnet Asian Music Awards | Performer | Mnet | Performed "Tanda Tanya" and "Mimpi" | |
| 2018 | Kiut Miut | Lana | Mediacorp Suria | Debut acting role | |
| 2019 | Fried Rice Paradise | Aishah | Mediacorp | | |
| 2019 | Roar! | Herself | CNA | Documentary, 2 episodes. | |
| 2019 | 2019 All That Music | Performer | KBS | | |
| 2022 | Berani Nyanyi? | Judge | Mediacorp Suria | | |
| 2022 | Sinar Lebaran 2022 | Performer | Mediacorp Suria | | |

=== Music videos ===
| Year | Title | Director | Notes |
|---|---|---|---|
| 2014 | "Mimpi" | —N/a | As part of Akademi Fantasia 10 |
| 2015 | "Pilihan Sejati" | —N/a | |
| 2016 | "Cahaya Aidilfitri" | theMalaya Productions | |
| 2016 | "Pulanglah" | theMalaya Productions | |
| 2016 | "Tanda Tanya" Official Lyric Video | theMalaya Productions | |
| 2018 | "Indah Pada Waktunya" | Awi Suryadi | |
| 2019 | "Bila Entah" | Nadirah Zakariya | |
| 2019 | "Say Yes to Waste Less" | | |
| 2020 | "Sugar (Live)" | Oszkid | Recorded live at the Lions Studios Singapore |
| 2020 | "Sugar - The Live Extended Play" | Oszkid | Recorded live at the Lions Studios Singapore |
| 2020 | "Loving Room" (prod. by yoonsang) | —N/a | |
| 2021 | "Won't You Come Around" | Jonathan Choo | |
| 2021 | "Smile" | Juan Ezwan | Recorded and mixed at The Greenroom Suite, Singapore, July 2020 |

=== Web series ===
| Year | Title | Role | Notes |
|---|---|---|---|
| 2018 | Indah Pada Waktunya The Series | Aisyah | 6 episode web series |
| 2020 | Singapore Anti-Social | Tasha Nazri | Produced by the BenZi project. Parody of Netflix's Singapore Social. 3 parts. |

=== Theatre ===
| Year | Title | Role | Details | Notes |
|---|---|---|---|---|
| 2022 | Bangsawan Gemala Malam | Various | Victoria Theatre, 2–4 June | Theatre debut; Bangsawan re-imagining of A Midsummer Night's Dream |
| 2023 | Potong | Doctor Dini | Esplanade Theatre Studio, 18–21 May | |

== Awards and nominations ==
Name of the award ceremony, year presented, category, nominee of the award, and the result of the nomination
| Award ceremony | Year | Category | Nominee / work | Result | Ref. |
|---|---|---|---|---|---|
| Akademi Fantasia Musim 10 | 2013 | —N/a | Herself | Sixth place | |
| Anugerah Planet Muzik (APM) | 2014 | Best Newcomer (Female) | Herself | Nominated | |
| Anugerah Planet Muzik (APM) | 2014 | Best Collaboration (Song) | "Mimpi" | Won | |
| Anugerah Planet Muzik (APM) | 2014 | Most Popular Artist (Singapore) | Herself | Nominated | |
| Anugerah Planet Muzik (APM) | 2014 | Best Song APM | "Mimpi" | Nominated | |
| Anugerah Planet Muzik (APM) | 2015 | Best Female Artist | Herself | Nominated | |
| Anugerah Planet Muzik (APM) | 2015 | Most Popular Artist (Singapore) | Herself | Nominated | |
| Anugerah Planet Muzik (APM) | 2015 | Most Popular Song (Malaysia) | "Pilihan Sejati" | Nominated | |
| Anugerah Planet Muzik (APM) | 2015 | Best Collaboration (Song) | "Pilihan Sejati" | Nominated | |
| Anugerah Planet Muzik (APM) | 2017 | Best Song APM | "Senyum Saja" | Won | |
| Anugerah Planet Muzik (APM) | 2017 | Best Song (Singapore) | "Senyum Saja" | Won | |
| Anugerah Planet Muzik (APM) | 2017 | Best Collaboration (Song) | "Tanda Tanya" | Won | |
| Anugerah Planet Muzik (APM) | 2017 | Best Duo/Group | Aisyah Aziz & Haikal Ali for "Senyum Saja" | Nominated | |
| Anugerah Planet Muzik (APM) | 2017 | Best Female Artist | Herself | Nominated | |
| Anugerah Planet Muzik (APM) | 2017 | Social Media Icon | Herself | Nominated | |
| Anugerah Planet Muzik (APM) | 2017 | Most Popular Song APM | "Tanda Tanya" | Nominated | |
| Anugerah Planet Muzik (APM) | 2017 | Most Popular Artist | Herself | Nominated | |
| 2017 Mnet Asian Music Awards | 2017 | Best Asian Artist (Singapore) | Herself | Won | |
| Anugerah Planet Muzik (APM) | 2018 | Best Collaboration (Artists) | "Indah Pada Waktunya" with Rizky Febian | Nominated | |
| Anugerah Planet Muzik (APM) | 2018 | Most Popular Artist (Singapore) | Herself | Nominated | |
| Anugerah Planet Muzik (APM) | 2018 | Social Media Icon | Herself | Nominated | |
| Anugerah Planet Muzik (APM) | 2018 | Most Popular Artist APM | Herself | Nominated | |
| Anugerah Planet Muzik (APM) | 2018 | Most Popular Song APM | "Indah Pada Waktunya" | Nominated | |
