= Aliff Aziz =

Singaporean singer and actor (born 1991)

- Born: Mohammad Aliff bin Aziz; 16 February 1991 (age 35); Singapore
- Occupations: Singer, model, actor
- Spouse: Bella Astillah (m. 2016; div. 2024)
- Children: 2
- Relatives: Aisyah Aziz (sister)
- Musical career
- Genres: Pop, pop rock, R&B, soul, country
- Years active: 2007–present
- Label: Sony Music BMG Malaysia

Mohammad Aliff bin Aziz (born 16 February 1991) is a Singaporean singer and actor based in Malaysia. He is managed under Sony Music BMG Malaysia. In July 2007, he was crowned the winner of a reality TV singing competition, Anugerah, making him the youngest winner (won the title at the age of 16) of the show/competition. In September of that same year, Aziz released his first self-titled album with single "Cinta Arjuna'" (Tong Hua cover) with 300,000 copies sold around Southeast Asia. His first single, "Sayang Sayang" received the most number of ringtone downloads (1 million) across Southeast Asia. Song was inspired by Sham Faisal who was told to have a very strong influence on the singer.

Aliff currently had 4 albums: Aliff (2007), It's Aliff's Time (2009), Aliff Aziz (2011) and Rebirth (2017).

== Early life and education ==
Born on 16 February 1991, Aliff Aziz is the first child of Aziz Sapdan, a personal driver, and Siti Hafiza Sheikh Mohamad, a clinic supervisor, establishing a Malay family of mixed Arab heritage. The family would also welcome twin girls, Nur Aisyah Binte Aziz and Nur A'in Binte Aziz three years later.

Aliff studied at Zhenghua Secondary School until 2007 for his Singapore-Cambridge GCE 'N' Level certificate which he had passed, before studying in a private school for his Singapore-Cambridge GCE 'O' Level certificate in 2008.

== Career ==
Aliff was crowned the youngest ever Anugerah 2007 talent show cum singing competition winner at age of 16. From the contest, he won a recording deal with Sony BMG and a cash prize of S$10,000. In the same year, he released his debut album, "Aliff" and sold 3,000 albums within two weeks of its release. "Sayang-Sayang", a single debuted fourth on the charts of Malay radio station Ria 89.7FM.

Following his win, he appeared most of Mediacorp shows such as Sinar Lebaran 2007 and 2008, Khayalan etc. He also appeared for a short 30 seconds KFC advertisement in 2007. It was reported by Malaysian magazine in 2008 he was juggling his busy schedule as an O levels student (private candidate) and career as a singer.

In 2009, Aliff Aziz was enlisted to the compulsory National Service where he was an instructor at the Singapore Civil Defence Force (Formerly known as BRTC/Basic Rescue Training Centre) in Jalan Bahar. In a Sungguh interview in 2010, Aliff was posted to admin to allow him to focus more on his singing career.

During that same year, Aliff released his second album "It's Aliff's Time" with its hits single "Cinta" and "Kalau Cinta" featuring Malaysian singer Joanna. "Kalau Cinta" topped the radio charts for a few months making it another record breaking song.

Aliff Aziz was member of Singapore Civil Defence Force Music Performing Arts Club (MPAC), where he performed as a vocalist for many SCDF occasions such as SCDF Promotion Ceremony, SCDF Community Day etc.

In 2011, Aliff ended his service with the nation and moved over to Kuala Lumpur, Malaysia to pursue his career as a recording artist, singer, model and actor.

In early 2012, Aliff Aziz released his third album "Aliff Aziz" where his single "Jangan Ganggu Pacarku" received 1 million views on its music video within 24 hours of release. Aliff other songs such as Cinta Ya Cinta and Setiap Detik was used as OST for dramas too.

Aliff also started a career in acting, his first drama, a comedy cum musical based drama "Antara Kita" which was directed by Kas Roshan about teenagers working in a graphic design company. The 13 episode drama also stars Zaibo, Fara Fauzana, Bell Ngasri and Anne Ngasri.

In December 2021, Aliff joined Malaysia's singing competition, Gegar Vaganza in which he ended up winning it and crowned champion. He also received RM 100,000 as a reward for coming in the first place.

== Personal life ==
In 2016, after dating for almost two years and being engaged for nine months, Aliff and Malaysian singer-actress Bella Astillah took their marriage vows and held a wedding reception for about 1,000 guests at the Top Glove convention centre in Shah Alam, Selangor. They have a son born in 2017, and a daughter born in 2020.

Aliff Aziz and Bella were officially divorced in 2019 but reconciled in 2020. In March 2024, Bella filed a petition to divorce Aliff for the second time after media exposed that Aliff was caught in khalwat with actress Ruhainies, with the proceedings in progress as of 8 April 2024.

== Discography ==
=== Studio albums ===
Sony Music BMG & Sony Music Entertainment

Year	Album	Track listing	Notes
2007	Aliff	Sayang Sayang; Nyala (Segaris Sinar OST); Cinta Arjuna; Harus Ku Teruskan; Ku Sendiri; Ini Satu Kisah; Dia; Bila Dengan Kamu; More Than Words; Stop	
2009	It's Aliff's Time	Cinta; Milikku Saja; Boom Boom Boom; Kalau Cinta (feat. Joanna); Kau Yang Ku Mahu; Selintas Kau Pergi; Puteri Khayalanku; Cinta (minus one)	
2011	Aliff Aziz	Jangan Ganggu Pacarku; Cinta Ya Cinta (Cinta Vlog OST); Hanya Lagu; Sudah Nasibku; Cinta Dusta; Setiap Sedetik (Epilog Cinta Khirana OST); Nada Cinta; Dilema Cinta; Jangan Ganggu Pacarku (minus one); Dilema (minus one)	

=== Singles ===
Year	Title	Chart (Malaysia)				Notes
Year	Title	Era FM	Hot FM	Muzik Muzik	JOOX	Notes
2012	"Keajaiban Cinta" (featuring Adira)	—	—	—	—	
2014	"Selayaknya Aku"	—	—	—	—	
2015	"Dan Lagi Cinta" (featuring Emma Suhaimi)	—	—	—	—	
2016	"Warna Cinta" (featuring Aliff Aziz)	—	—	—	—	Gerua – Malay Version (from Dilwale film)
2016	"Tak Ada Cinta Sepertimu" (featuring Siti Nordiana)	—	—	—	—	
2016	"Coba"	—	—	—	—	
2017	"Sandar Padaku" (featuring Mira Filzah)	—	—	—	—	Soundtrack for television series Meh, Sandar Pada Aku!
2022	"Tetap Disini" (featuring Bella Astillah)	—	—	—	—	
2023	"Genggam"	—	—	—	—	Soundtrack for television series Ku Akad Kau Dengan Bismillah

== Filmography ==
=== Television series ===
Year	Title	Role	Notes	Ref
2007	Almari Ajaib			
2007	Khayalan		cameo	
2012	Antara Kita	Aril		
2012	Sepai	Asmaun		
2012	Tiara	Kamal		
2013	Nurul Kasih	Izham		
2013	Epilog Cinta Khirana	Sharqir Ikhwan		
2014	Jodoh : Season 2	Syed Azmi		
2017	Di Sebalik Wajah	Amir Hisyam		
2017	Meh, Sandar Pada Aku!	Dr. Syed Nadzhan		
2017	Meh, Sandar Lagi	Dr. Syed Nadzhan		
2018	Melankolia	Zain		
2018	Halalkan Hati Yang Ku Curi	Faiq		
2018	Sejuta Rasa Buat Adelia	Chef Syed Idlan		
2023	Ku Akad Kau Dengan Bismillah	Luth Mikail		

=== Telemovie ===
Year	Title	Role	Notes	Ref
2012	Cinta Vlog	Shezz		
2013	Gerhana	Man		
2013	Tiga Dosa			
2013	Dia Ayahku			
2013	Raya Pak Pak Pong	Angah		
2017	Love You Miss Pomen	Remy		
2019	Dosa Itu Bukan Miliknya	Fitri		
