= Nabila Razali =

- نبيلة رزالي
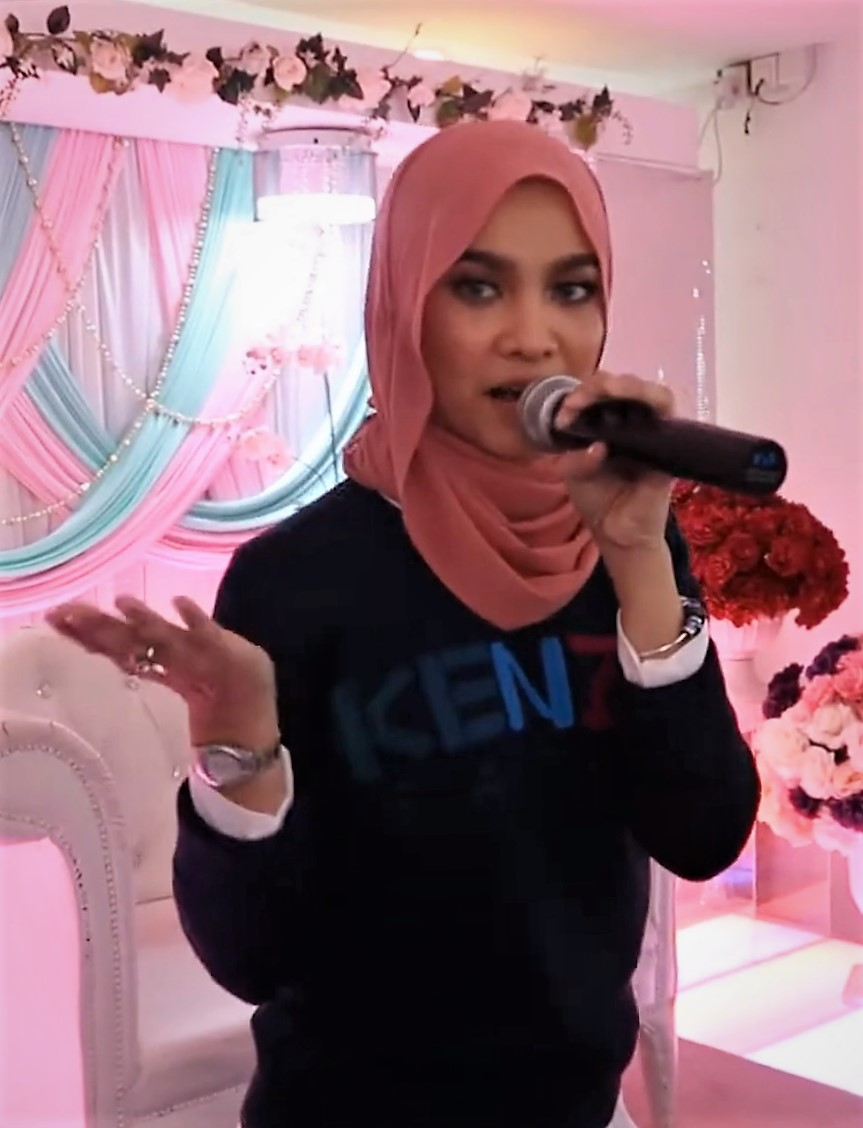
- Nabila performing in February 2018.
- Born: Nur Nabila binti Mohd Razali; 13 November 1992 (age 33); Petaling Jaya, Selangor, Malaysia
- Education: Bachelor of Architecture
- Alma mater: University of Science Malaysia (USM); International Islamic University of Malaysia (IIUM); St. Mary's Secondary School Kuala Lumpur
- Occupations: Singer; Actress; Host Television
- Years active: 2013—present
- Spouse: Nik Iruwan bin Dato' Nik Izani (m. 2023)
- Children: 10
- Parent(s): Shamsidah Abd Rahman (mother); Mohd Razali Mura (father)
- Musical career
- Genres: Pop; ballad; R&B
- Instrument: Vocal
- Labels: Seventeen Eleven Music (2016–2020); Nabila Razali Entertainment (2020–present)

Nur Nabila Mohd Razali' (Jawi: نر نبيلة بنت محمة رزالي; born 13 November 1992) is a Malaysian singer and actress. Her career began after participating in Akademi Fantasia season 10 in 2013 where she managed to win fifth place. She is famous for the songs "Katakan Saja" and "Cemburu" which received positive reviews, but is better known for the song "Pematah Hati", which also received positive reviews, becoming a benchmark for her music career. As an actor, she has starred in a number of television drama series and telefilms. Among his acting credits are Hikayat Cinta Si Pematah Hati (2017), Pesan Pada Hati (2019) and Seindah Tujuh Warna Pelangi (2020).

== Early life ==
Nabila was born on 13 November 1992 in Petaling Jaya, Selangor and raised in Selayang. The youngest of three siblings to Shamsidah Abd Rahman and Mohd Razali Mura, she is a graduate of the Bachelor of Architecture department at Universiti Sains Malaysia (USM) in Penang. She then pursued her master's degree in the same field at International Islamic University Malaysia (IIUM). Nabila is also a former student of St. Mary's Secondary School Kuala Lumpur.

== Career ==
Nabila began her career as a singer through the show Akademi Fantasia season 10 (AF2013), alongside singers such as Faizul Sany, Hael Husaini, Amira Othman and Indah Ruhaila. After 10 weeks of performing at the AF2013 concert, she managed to win fifth place. Here are her performances at AF2013:

1. Week 1: "Gemilang" original song Ella
2. Week 2: "Setia Ku Di Sini" original song Ziana Zain
3. Week 3: "Berlari" original song Tomok
4. Week 4: "Aku Yang Tersakiti" original song Judika
5. Week 5: "Wajah Rahsia Hati" original song Ogy Ahmad Daud
6. Week 6: "Lovefool" original song The Cardigans
7. Week 7: "Keliru" (duet with Alif Satar) original song Ajai & Nurul
8. Week 8: "Gelombang" original song Salamiah Hassan
9. Week 9: "Tentang Rasa" original song Astrid and "Permata Biru" original song Ella
10. Week 10: "Seandinya Masih Ada Cinta" original song Dayang Nurfaizah and "Katakan Saja" (new song) sung by herself

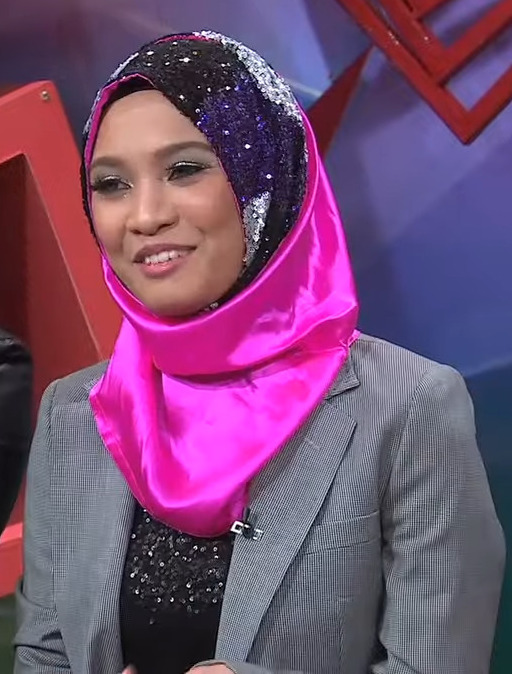
Nabila was interviewed on the show MeleTOP on Astro Ria on 26 August 2014.

According to her in the interview: "I have loved singing since I was little. In university, my friends and I used to be street musicians". Her first single, "Katakan Saja", received an encouraging response from listeners. However, Nabila began to slow down her artistic activities because she was still studying at a local public university. In 2015, she formed the group The Lomas which also included Aisyah Aziz, Amira Othman and Indah Ruhaila. The group has released two singles so far, "Bila Larut Malam" and "Rindu". After graduating, he returned to focusing on the field of art again when he released the single "Cemburu" which also received a warm response from fans in 2016.

Nabila also tried her hand at acting through two telefilms, namely Bibik Aku Nak Berak (2013) and Ustaz Baru Nak Start (2016). In 2017, Nabila expanded her wings through the drama Hikayat Cinta Si Pematah Hati starring alongside Alif Satar. Playing the main character Wafeen Wardah, her acting received positive reactions from fans. In November 2017, Nabila released her latest single titled "Pematah Hati" and became a commercial success. The music video was directed by The Storytellrs and features Aedy Ashraf, Yaya Zahir and Adriana Adnan.

In 2018, she and Sarawak-born YouTube celebrity, Priscilla Abby sang the theme song for the 2018 biopic film, Lee Chong Wei: Rise of the Legend titled "Cahaya Juara". The recording of this song was conducted on 13 February 2018 in Kuala Lumpur, Malaysia and Bangkok, Thailand.

In January 2019, Nabila released her latest single, "Vroom Vroom" with its music video featuring actor Fendy Bakry. It received over a million views after four days of launch and also ranked second on Malaysia's trending list with 38,000 likes.

In 2020, Nabila appeared with her latest single "Peluang Kedua" featuring MK from the group K-Clique. The music video uploaded to YouTube garnered one million views in a day, which is considered successful because it features MK's rap in the video.

In November 2020, Nabila announced that she had withdrawn from Separuh Akhir Muzik Muzik 35 due to health problems she was facing. However, the song "Peluang Kedua" sung by Hael Husaini at SFMM35. And in December 2020, Hael announced on Twitter that Nabila will perform at the 35th Song Champion Awards on 7 February 2021.

She starred alongside Aiman Hakim Ridza in the drama series Biar Mereka Cemburu which premiered on Astro Ria on 1 December 2020. She plays the main character as Nadia.

She has also been appointed as an ambassador for the beauty brand Siti Nurhaliza, Beautessence and an ambassador for the beverage product BeFine. Her latest single, "Putus" was released in November 2021.

She also dabbled in writing when she launched the novel Kerana Cinta Itu Ada. Launched on March 16, 2022, it is her first work with the novelist Sopphilea.

== Discography ==
=== Single ===
Year	Title	Collaboration	Lyricist	Composer	Note
2013	Katakan Saja	—	Abyssinia Thursday	Zul M	
2016	Cemburu	—	Hael Husaini & Ezra Kong		OST Drama Arluna'
2017	Pemarah Hati	—	Hael Husaini & Ezra Kong		Drama OST Love Story of the Heartbreaker
2018	Cahaya Juara	Priscilla Abby	Teng Bee & Ben Lee	Teng Bee	Movie OST Lee Chong Wei: Rise of the Legend]
2019	Vroom Vroom	—	Hael Husaini & Ezra Kong		
2020	Peluang Kedua	—	Hael Husaini & MFMF		Drama OST As Beautiful as the Seven Colors of the Rainbow'
2021	Putus	—	Erwin Purnama & Nabila Razali		
2022	Tak Ingin Usai	Keisya Levronka	Mario G. Klau	Tohpati	
2022	Aku Terluka	—	Amylea Azizan	Amylea Azizan & MFMF	
2023	Selagi Ku Ada	Khai Bahar	Amylea Azizan		OST Drama Because Love Is There
2023	Tulus	Adi Priyo	Aiman Sidek		
2023	Cerita Kita	Insomniacks	Iqie Hugh, Iskandar & Danial		

== Filmography ==
=== Movies ===
Year	Title	Character	Notes
2020	Keluarga Iskandar The Movie	Linda	First film, guest star
2023	Geng Sakau Vs Hantu Ting Tong	Pah	

=== Drama ===
Year	Title	Character	TV Channel	Notes
2017	Hikayat Cinta Si Pematah Hati	Wafeen Wardah	Astro Ria	First drama
2018	Cintaku di Bumi Izmir	Fara	Unifi TV	
2018	Matahari Cerah Lagi	Suha	TV Okey	
2018	Sunsilk #SISCUBA	Mawar	TV3	Short drama
2018	Cik Reen & Encik Ngok Ngek	Siti	Astro Ria	
2019	Pesan Dari Hati	Zulaika	TV3	
2020	Seindah Tujuh Warna Pelangi	Aira Tihani	TV3	
2020	Kebaya Kasut Kanvas	Suria Juliana	TV3	
2020	Biar Mereka Cemburah	Nadia	Astro Ria	
2021	Keluarga Epik	Syamira	TV3	
2021	SMK (Season 3)	Cikgu Izara	Astro Ceria	Guest Cast
2022	Mem & Bibik Bibik	Bibik Dr. Adzira	TV3	
2022	Wan Senja	Liya	TV3	
2022	Lockdown 2	Shasha	Astro Ria	
2022	Kerana Cinta Itu Ada	Nabila Aulia	TV3	
2023	Luruhnya Bunga Cinta	Maisara	TV3	
2024	Luruhnya Bunga Cinta 2	Maisara	TV3	
2026	Wanita Itu Johor Bahru	Kamisah	TV3	

=== Web drama ===
Year	Title	Character	Network	Notes
2024	Bawah Payung Awan	Widad	Viu	First drama

=== Telefilm ===
Year	Title	Character	TV channel
2013	Bibik Aku Nak Kahwin	Sofea	Astro Ria
2016	Ustaz Baru Nak Start	Nabila	Astro Ria
2018	Pengantin Lari Kulik Artist	Fammy	Astro Citra
2019	Lelaki Keli Klas Sebelah	Nona	TV3
2019	Nana Dan Jam Atok	Cikgu Liza	TV3
2019	Cik Reen & Encik Ngok Ngek Raya	Siti	Astro Ria
2020	Cik Petir Putrajaya	Sapeah	TV3
2022	Hantu Karaoke	Cumi	TV3
2023	Rombongan Cik Kiah Ke AJL	Mira	watch

=== Television ===
Year	Title	Role	TV Channel	Notes
2013	Akademi Fantasia (season 10)	Participants	Astro Ria	
2016	Hot TV	Featured Artist	TV9	Hot Acoustics
2017	Wanita Hari Ini	Invited Guest	TV3	
2017	Bismillah Ad-Dhuha	Invited Guest	Astro Oasis & Astro Maya HD	
2018	Ketuk-Ketuk Ramadan	Invited Guest	TV1	
2019	Senang Terhibur	Guest Artist	TV3	
2019	O KIDS	Host	Astro Ceria	
2022	Lazada: Super Party	Host	TV3	
2022	Ronda-Ronda Ramadan	Guest Artist	TV2	
2022	Pandai Masak Ke Tu?	Guest Artist	TV9	
2022	Jenaka Kampung Kalut (Season 6)	Natasha	TV3	Episode: "Wali"
2022	Dapur Panas	Guest Artist	TV3	
2024	The Masked Singer Malaysia (season 4)	Participant (Teratai)	Astro Warna	

=== Advertisement ===
Year	Advertisement	Note
2018	Nivea: A Step of Confidence	
2021	Wonder Dewi Catz Series	
2022	Lazada Raya: Growing in the Heart	With Syafiq Kyle & Nora Danish
2022	KFC Raya: Makanan Rasmi Balik Kampung	
2022	Raya Keluarga Malaysia	With Jalil Hamid, Wan Maimunah, Hasnul Rahmat as Uda

== Awards and nominations ==
Year	Award	Category	Recipient/Nominated work	Results
2018	2018 Berita Harian Popular Star Awards	Popular Female Singer	Herself	Nominated
2018	2018 Berita Harian Popular Star Awards	Popular Female TV Actress	Herself	Nominated
2020	2020 Daily News Popular Star Award	Popular Female Singer	Herself	Nominated
2020	2020 Daily News Popular Star Award	Popular Female TV Actress	Herself	Nominated
2020	2020 Daily News Popular Star Award	Drama Compatible Couple (with Shukri Yahaya)	Message to the Heart	Nominated
2023	35th Daily News Popular Star Award	Popular Female Singer	Herself	Nominated
