= Suliza Salam =

Former Malaysian singer

- Born: 21 July 1965 (age 60); Batu Pahat, Johor, Malaysia
- Occupation: Singer
- Years active: 1984–present
- Spouse(s): Dato' Zainal Nazeri Zainuddin (divorced); Ismail A. Samad (m. 2024)
- Children: Nur Izzati Zainal Nazeri; Nur Falahi Zainal Nazeri; Ismail Izzani

Suliza Salam is a former Malaysian female singer. She gained prominence with the song Untuk Sekali Lagi in 1984, produced under the record label Titra Rekod.

== Career ==
Suliza Salam rose to fame with her song Untuk Sekali Lagi. Her name gained significant recognition after recording the song in 1984 under Titra Rekod, placing her alongside other renowned singers such as Ramlah Ram, Nassier Wahab, and Noraniza Idris.

The song, composed by Othman Mohamad, not only boosted Suliza's reputation in the music industry but also established her as one of the most popular teenage singers at the time.

Suliza gained recognition for her melodious voice and the distinctive features that set her apart in the industry. Her unique eyes led a Radio Malaysia Ibu Kota (RMIK) announcer, Noramin, to nickname her the "cat-eyed singer" in 1985 while introducing her song on-air.

Following the success of her debut album, Suliza Salam released her second album, Cinta Di Hatiku, in 1989. This album marked the peak of her career, but two years after its release, Suliza decided to accept a marriage proposal from Zainal Nazeri Zainuddin, a businessman associated with Pengedar Utama Sdn. Bhd., which produced the films Pelumba Malam and Isabella (1988).

Despite being at the height of her fame, Suliza made the firm decision to step back from the entertainment industry to focus on her family life.

In 2010 Suliza was married to entrepreneur Zainal Nazeri Zainuddin and shared her life with their three children: Nur Izzati, Nur Falahi, and singer Ismail Izzani.

== Charity work ==
As her children grew older, Suliza ventured into business and charitable activities. Starting in 2004, Suliza began her journey in business, establishing herself in consultancy services for motivational camps. Through her company, PDSB Consultant, Suliza focused on providing experienced consultants to higher education institutions.

Her office is in Ampang, Selangor. Besides managing her business, Suliza is also active in non-governmental organization (NGO) activities.

She serves as the chair of the Women's Committee for the Bukit Antarabangsa branch of the Malaysian Islamic Welfare Organization (PERKIM) and is also a member of the National Women's Supreme Council.

Her responsibilities include overseeing the welfare of converts to Islam and orphans. Leveraging her experience as a singer in 1984, Suliza organized performances to raise funds for charity.

== Family ==
Suliza's youngest child, Ismail Izzani, has followed in her footsteps as a singer, achieving fame with the song Sabar. The music video for Sabar, co-written by Omar K, Adib Hamdi, Zyn, and Ismail himself, has garnered over four million views on YouTube.

Her second child, Nur Falahi, became engaged to Muhammad Wafi Abdul Shakor, the third son of Mashitah Ibrahim, on 1 January 2021.
