= Bella Astillah =

Malaysian singer and actress (born 1994)

Yang Berbahagia Puan Bella Astillah
- بيلا استيلاه
- Born: Dayang Nabellah binti Awang Astillah; 15 March 1994 (age 32); Sandakan, Sabah, Malaysia
- Education: UNITAR (formerly known as KLMUC)
- Occupations: Actress; singer; model
- Years active: 2006–present
- Spouse(s): Aliff Aziz (m. 2016; div. 2024) Syed Saddiq Syed Abdul Rahman (m. 2026)
- Children: 2
- Musical career
- Genre: Pop
- Instrument: Vocal
- Label: Universal Music Malaysia

Dayang Nabellah Awang Astillah (Jawi: دايڠ نابيله اوڠ استيله; born 15 March 1994) is a Malaysian singer, actress and model.

== Career ==
Bella began her career during her childhood when she and her sister, Didi Astillah recorded an album of children's songs and from that album, Bella and her sister became known as Anak-anak Mutiara (The Pearl Children). In 2019, she starred in the drama adaptation of the novel, Cinta Belum Tamat Tempoh with Nafiz Muaz. Subsequently, she released her first solo single, "Tenang", on 27 March 2020.

== Personal life ==
Bella Astillah was born and raised in Sandakan, Sabah and is the eldest of two sisters. She began a relationship with Singaporean singer Aliff Aziz in 2014. The couple became engaged on 12 December 2015. They married on 9 September 2016 in a ceremony held at the Crystal Ballroom, Melia Kuala Lumpur hotel. A wedding reception was later held at Top Glove Pavilion in Shah Alam.

The couple's relationship deteriorated in the following years due to many issues. Bella had first filed for divorce in May 2019. The divorce was granted in July 2019, with Bella stating in court that "my husband always cheats on me". However, the couple reconciled in late 2019 during Bella's iddah period.

In 2023, Bella made a police report against Aliff alleging he had committed khalwat (close proximity) with another actress, leading to his arrest. She filed for divorce for a second and final time, which was granted in June 2024.

In 2025, Bella began a relationship with Malaysian politician Syed Saddiq. The couple, which is also known as 'BASS', became engaged on 28 March 2026. An 8-episode reality series documenting their relationship, titled "Walimatul Urus Bella Astillah & Syed Saddiq", is scheduled to be broadcast on Astro Ria starting October 6, with their wedding ceremony scheduled to be broadcast live on October 10.

On 10 October 2026, Bella married Syed Saddiq, a Member Parliament of Muar in an Islamic solemnisation ceremony held on the 118th floor of Merdeka 118 in Kuala Lumpur. The marriage was solemnised at 10:40 a.m. by former Federal Territories Mufti Zulkifli Mohamad Al-Bakri, with the marriage contract concluded after a single pronouncement. Bella received a mahr of RM500, along with seven trays of wedding gifts, which were reciprocated with nine trays from her family.

== Discography ==
=== Singles ===
List of singles
Title	Year	Album
"Tenang"	2020	Non-album single
"Tetapi Di Sini" (with Aliff Aziz)	2022	Non-album single
"Pano"	2023	Non-album single
"Bermanja Manja" (with Didi Astillah)	2024	Non-album single
"Lukisan"	2024	Non-album single
"Tapi Bukan Denganmu"	2024	Non-album single
"Cacaca" (with Nabila Razali)	2024	Non-album single
"Lebih Indah Berpisah" (with Ade Govinda)	2025	Non-album single
"Akhirnya Kamu" (with Daniesh Suffian)	2025	Non-album single

== Filmography ==
=== Drama ===
Year	Title	Role	TV channel	Notes
2008	Gaia (Season 1)	Bella	Astro Ria	First drama Episode: "Jay, Bella, Fifi dan..."
2019	Cinta Belum Tamat Tempoh	Qaisara	Astro Ria	
2021	Yang Bakal Mati Ramadan Ini	Zalia	Awesome TV	
2021	Ramadani	Lydia	TV3	
2021	Kampung Kolestrol	Bella	TV9	
2021	Malaysian Ghost Stories	Maria	Astro Ria	Episode "Balan balan"
2021	Kita Regu	Lana	Astro Arena	
2021	Perisik Cinta Tak Diundang	Erianna	TV3	
2022	Aku Tanpa Cintamu	Nuha	TV3	
2022	Adakah Engkau Menungguku	Maya	TV3	
2022–2023	Cina Buta	Bella	Astro Ria	Special appearance
2023	Jangan Ambil Kerja Tuhan	Laila	TV2	Episode 21
2024	Leha, Leya Lawa	Leha	Tonton	
2024	Satu Hari Nanti	Aulia Jane	IQIYI	

=== Telefilm ===
Year	Title	Role	TV channel	Notes
2019	Jamil Balik Kampung	Jamilah	Astro Citra	First Telefilm
2021	Mek Bunga	Yati	TV2	
2022	Doktor Idaman	Meem	TV3	
2022	Sekolah Sampah	Nureen	Astro Citra	
2022	Kerusi Kecil	Adra	TV1	
2024	Restu Untuk Mila	Shima	TV1	

=== Television ===
Year	Title	Role	TV channel	Notes
2019	Masak Apa Tu?	Celebrity choice couple	TV3	With Aliff Aziz
2020	Nyanyi Dari Rumah	Chosen Artist	TV2	With Ezad Lazim & Aizat Amdan
2020	The Sherry Show	Invited artist	TV3	With Fizo Omar dan Mas Idayu
2021	Sepahtu Reunion Live 2021	Mila	Astro Warna	Invitwd artist: Episode "Di Sebalik Pentas"
2021	Punchline DAC	Invited artist	Astro Warna	
2022	Famili Duo (Season 2)	Celebrity couple contestant	TV3	with Wani Kayrie
2022	Sepahtu Reunion Live 2022	Balqis	Astro Warna	Invited Artist: Episode "Kasih Bukan Pilihan"
2025	Sepahtu Reunion Live 2025	Alya	Astro Prima	Invited Artist: Episode "Resepi Berkasih"
2025	Muzikal Lawak Superstar (musim 5)	Permanent host	Astro Prima	

=== Others ===
Year	Title	Role	Channel	Notes
2023	Studio Sembang	As herself	YouTube	Invited artist; Episode : "Tetap Disini"; Hosted by Amelia Henderson
