= Khai Bahar =

- Born: Muhammad Khairul bin Baharuddin; 28 February 1994 (age 32); Kampung Padang Katong, Kangar, Perlis, Malaysia
- Musical career
- Genres: Pop; Ballad; Slow Rock
- Occupations: Singer; Composer; Lyricist; Actor
- Years active: 2016–present
- Labels: NAR Records; Seventeen Eleven Music; Rusa Music

Muhammad Khairul Baharuddin (born 28 February 1994) or better known as Khai Bahar is a Malaysian male singer and actor. He became known through his smule application and earned the title "King of Smule" from his fans.

Khai Bahar has a large group of supporters not only in Malaysia but also in Brunei, Hong Kong, Indonesia, Singapore and Thailand. In the 8 years of being an artist, Khai Bahar has won almost 50 awards, namely from the MeleTOP ERA Award (2017–2021), the Popular Star Award Berita Harian (2017–2021), the Planet Music Award (2017 & 2018), the Top Hot HOT FM Award (2017) and the ERA Digital Music Award (2018 & 2019).

== Early life ==
Khai Bahar, born on February 28, 1994, is the fourth child of six siblings and he comes from Kampung Padang Katong, Kangar, Perlis.

== Career ==
Khai Bahar started his singing career as a busker / street singer in Kuching, Sarawak in addition to regularly uploading his cover songs as well as his own songs on his Youtube Channel "Muhammad Khairul".

Before becoming a singer, Khai Bahar was once invited to do an opening act for popular singers. In addition, Khai Bahar also attended auditions for reality competitions such as Akademi Fantasia but luck was not on his side.

His name began to gain attention and attract the interest of many Malaysian and Indonesian music fans after his singing video uploaded on the SMULE application went viral around early 2016. The first song he sang on the SMULE application was the song Flashlight by Jessy J in 2015, followed by other songs. Among his songs that received much attention were "Sudah Ku Tahu" (Projector Band), "Ku Tak Akan Bersuara" (Nike Ardilla) and "Memori Berkasih" a duet with Siti Nordiana.

Khai Bahar got coverage on Indonesian television station, RCTI through their entertainment program titled Silet. Khai Bahar got attention on the Silet program after his SMULE video with the song "Ku Tak Akan Bersuara" originally sung by Nike Ardilla which was popular in 1994 went viral in Indonesia and Malaysia in 2016. Through the Silet program, two Indonesian singers, Soimah and Nia Daniaty, praised Khai Bahar's vocal abilities.

In 2016, Khai Bahar was offered a contract to be under the NAR Records recording company. After almost 3 years as a singer under the NAR Records label, Khai Bahar already has seven solo songs, namely "Bayang", "Dari Jauh Saja", "Sinar Syawal", "Luluh", "Cahaya 114", "Jodohku" and "#123". Khai Bahar also has three duet songs titled "Rahsia Kita", "Cinta Syurga" "Satukan Rasa" and "Nafas Cinta". The song "Rahsia Kita" is a duet song with Fatin Husna who is a new female singer under the same label as him, NAR Records. The song "Cinta Syurga" is a dhikr-shaped song, his duet with popular Malaysian singer, Dato' Sri Siti Nurhaliza. While the song "Satukan Rasa" is a ballad duet with Siti Nordiana and the song "Nafas Cinta" is a chorus with Aina Abdul.

After three years in the art industry as a singer, Khai Bahar showed his talent in the world of acting. He was lucky to be given the trust to play the main character in his first drama titled "Satukan Rasa". Later, he continued his experiments in the field of acting by starring in the dramas "Kisah Cinta Rumi" and "Shakira".

The peak of Khai Bahar's popularity was when he won the title of MeleTOP New Artist at the MeleTOP ERA 2017 Awards, then two trophies at the BH Popular Star Awards (ABPBH) 3.0, namely Popular Male New Artist and Popular Male Singer. In addition, at the 2017 Planet Music Awards in Singapore, he won the Most Popular Song (Bayang) and Most Popular Artist categories. Next, he also won the Top Hot HOT FM 2017 through the Hot Singer 2017, Hot Song 2017 (Luluh) and FB Live Hot 2017 categories (with Wany Hasrita).

== Discography ==
=== Studio album ===
Year	Title	Labels
2019	Air Mata	NAR Records
2021	Damba Ketenangan	Seventeen Eleven Music

=== Concert ===
Year	Title	Venue/Location
2022	Konsert Nafas Cinta Khai Bahar (12 Feb)	Petaling Jaya Performing Arts Centre
2023	DFP with Khai Bahar (11 Nov)	Dewan Filharmonik Petronas

=== Single ===
Year	Title	Composer	Lyrics	Labels
2016	"Bayang"	Nature	Patrick Anohada	NAR Records
2017	"Dari Jauh Saja"	Akhadiat Denny		NAR Records
2017	"Sinar Syawal"	Patrick Anohada		NAR Records
2017	"Luluh"	Khai Bahar		NAR Records
2018	"Cahaya 114"	Azrul Azlan		NAR Records
2018	"Jodohku" (OST Cinta Tiada Ganti)	Adi Priyo	White Man	NAR Records
2018	"#123"	Khai Bahar	Khai Bahar & Patrick Anohada	NAR Records
2019	"Air Mata"	Khai Bahar		NAR Records
2019	"Dia"	Khai Bahar		NAR Records
2019	"Keranamu"	Khai Bahar		NAR Records
2019	"Penantian"	Manusia Putih		NAR Records
2019	"Menyesal"	Manusia Putih		NAR Records
2019	"Ratuku"	Kanda, Azrul Azlan & Anwar Husaini	Azrul Azlan	Seventeen Eleven Music
2020	"HatiNyawa"	Faizal Tahir		Faithful Music
2020	"Durja" (OST Tak Sempurna Mencintaimu)	Iqie Hugh, Omar K & Khai Bahar		Faithful Music
2020	"Bangkit Semula"	Adi Pawana & Gjie	Adi Pawana	Seventeen Eleven Music
2021	"Hilang Gelita" (OST Kisah Cinta Rumi)	Khai Bahar	Rozisangdewi	Seventeen Eleven Music
2021	"Sengsara" (OST Dendam Penunggu)	John Jeeves, Firdaus Rahmat & Omar K		Alternate Records & Talents
2022	"Damba" (OST Shakira)	Iqie Hugh & Omar K		Seventeen Eleven Music
2022	"Oh Wanita"	Harry Khalifa		Deer Music
2023	"Lat Tali Lat" (OST Puaka Cuti Semester)	Johan John	Khaleel	Alternate Records & Talents
2024	"Lemas"	Hykal Kadir	Hamizan Ali	Alternate Records & Talents
2024	"Bawa Hatiku Bersama Kamu"	Ajai		Indigital Music
2024	"Kerna Dia"	Iqie Hugh, Effe Inviellya & Aniq Iffat		World Peace Entertainment
2024	"Kerana Ego"	Relaxed Rabbit	Khai Bahar	MVM Music
2025	"Gelagat Raya"	Rudy Nastia, Jebat Asmara, Kelana & Adi Pawana	Adi Pawana, Rudy Nastia & Jebat Asmara	Sony Music Entertainment Malaysia
2025	"Beri Sedikit Waktu"	Adi Pawana & Rudy Nastia		Sony Music Entertainment Malaysia
2025	"Kalau Bukan Aku"	Farouk Roman	Senna	Sony Music Entertainment Malaysia
2026	"Aku Rindu"	Farouk Roman	Adrianna Cinta	Sony Music Entertainment Malaysia

=== Duet ===
Year	Title	Composer	Lyrics	Label
2018	"Rahsia Kita" (duet with Fatin Husna) (OST Drama Rahsia Hati Perempuan)	Harris Yusoff	Jim Bimasakti	NAR Records
2018	"Cinta Syurga" (duet with Dato' Sri Siti Nurhaliza)	Siti Nurhaliza		Siti Nurhaliza Productions Universal Music Malaysia
2019	"Satukan Rasa" (duet with Siti Nordiana) (OST Drama Satukan Rasa)	Kanda & Dinda	Iman Imran	Seventeen Eleven Music
2020	"Nafas Cinta" (duet with Aina Abdul) (OST Drama Kekasih Hati Mr Bodyguard) & (Theme Song Lagu Cinta Kita TV3 Season 3 2021)	Aina Abdul & Khai Bahar	Aina Abdul & Wan Zakaria	Universal Music Malaysia
2020	"Setanggi Syurga" version 2020 (duet with Inteam)	Manis Helma	ITO Lara	Seventeen Eleven Music
2022	"Kaulah Syurga" (duet with Lia Aziz (OST Drama 7 Hari Mencintaiku 3)	Asfan Shah	Siti Rosmizah Semail	Rusa Music Alternate Records & Talents
2023	"Selagi Ku Ada" (duet with Nabila Razali) (OST Drama Kerana Cinta Itu Ada)	Amylea Azizan		Alternate Records & Talents
2023	"Pejam" (duet with Adira Suhaimi)	Audi Mok & Shazee		Nova Music Malaysia
2023	"Tekad Perpaduan Penuhi Harapan" (duet with Aina Abdul)	Affan Mazlan		Radio Televisyen Malaysia
2024	"Rabiatul Adawiyah 2024" (collaboration with Inteam)	Munif Ahmad	Abdul Kahar	Inteam Records
2024	"Macam Dulu-Dulu" (duet with Marsha Milan) (RaRa MPB Campaign)	Shazee Ishak & Audi Mok		Alternate Records & Talents
2024	"Berbagi Hati" (duet with Wany Hasrita) (OST Drama Berbahagi Suami)	Amylea Azizan		Sony Music Entertainment Malaysia
2025	"Toksik" (duet with Yulia Kamelia) (OST Drama Setiaku Berdiri)	Farouk Roman	Adrianna Cinta	Sony Music Entertainment Malaysia

== Filmography ==
=== Drama ===
Year	Title	Character	TV Channel	Notes
2018	Cinta Tiada Ganti (Tiara Slot)	Himself	Astro Prima and Astro Maya HD	First drama, special appearance
2019	Satukan Rasa (Megadrama Slot)	Faizal Bakri	Astro Ria	
2021	Kisah Cinta Rumi (Lestary Slot)	Mikael Adzim	TV3	
2022	Shakira (Akasia Slot)	Irdi	TV3	
2024	Cinta Bukan Milik Kita (Slot Samarinda)	Ahmad Redza	TV3	
2025	Abang Imam Minah Skuter	Hamidon	Viu	

=== Telefilm ===
Year	Title	Character	TV Channel
2023	Pinang Durian	Hamid	Tonton
2025	Ustaz G Major	Cikgu Farhan	Astro Oasis & Astro Ria

=== Television ===
Year	Title	As	TV Channel
2018	Bintang Minggu Ini	Main singer with guest artist	Astro Ria
2019	I Can See Your Voice Malaysia (season 2) Ep 2	Guest artist	TV3
2020	Konsert Minggu Ini	Main singer with guest artist	TV2
2020	Immortal Songs Malaysia	Participants	TV3
2020	Gegar Vaganza 2020	Guest Artist (with Linda Nawuwil)	Astro Ria
2020	Big Stage 2020	Guest Artist (with Azzam Sham)	Astro Ria
2021	All Together Now Malaysia	Jury	Astro Ria
2021	Gegar Vaganza 2021	Guest Artist (with Suki Low)	Astro Ria
2022	All Together Now Malaysia (Season 2)	Jury	Astro Ria
2023	Big Stage 2023	Guest Artist (with Nadeera Zaini)	Astro Ria
2023	Hiburan Minggu Ini (karok)	Guest Artist	TV2
2023	Yang Paling Padu (Ep 3)	Penyanyi Utama (with Wany Hasrita)	Astro
2024	I Can See Your Voice Malaysia (season 7) Ep 11	Guest Artist	TV3

== Awards and achievements ==
Year	Award	Category	Achievement
2017	MeleTOP Era 2017 Awards	MeleTOP New Artist	Won
2017	MeleTOP Era 2017 Awards	MeleTOP Singer	Won
2017	30th Daily News Popular Star Award	Popular Male New Artist	Won
2017	30th Daily News Popular Star Award	Popular Male Singer	Won
2017	Anugerah Planet Muzik (2017)	Most Popular Artist	Won
2017	Anugerah Planet Muzik (2017)	Most Popular Song (Bayang)	Won
2017	Top Hot Award - HOT FM 2017	Hot Male Singer	Won
2017	Top Hot Award - HOT FM 2017	Hot Songs 2017 (Luluh)	Won
2017	Top Hot Award - HOT FM 2017	FB Live Hot - Jamming with Khai Bahar & Wany Hasrita	Won
2018	ERA Digital Music Awards 2018	Best Cover Song (Luluh)	Won
2018	Anugerah Juara Lagu Ke-32	Bayang	Finalist
2018	Anugerah Juara Lagu Ke-32	Samsung's Choice Singer	Won
2018	2018 Era MeleTOP Awards	MeleTOP Singer	Won
2018	2018 Era MeleTOP Awards	MeleTOP Songs (Bayang)	Won
2018	2018 Era MeleTOP Awards	Top Top MeleTOP (Male)	Won
2018	Anugerah Planet Muzik 2018	Most Popular APM Artist	Won
2018	Anugerah Planet Muzik 2018	APM Social Media Icon	Won
2018	31st Daily Star Awards	Popular Male Singer	Won
2019	ERA Digital Music Awards 2019	Most Popular Singer on Social Media	Won
2019	Anugerah Juara Lagu Ke-33	Luluh	Finalist
2019	MYSC Awards 2019	MYSC Breakthrough Awards (Male)	Won
2019	2019 Era MeleTOP Awards	Male MeleTOP Singer	Won
2019	2019 Era MeleTOP Awards	Top Top MeleTOP (Male)	Won
2019	EH Style Awards 2019	Hopeful Celebrity	Won
2019	32nd Daily News Popular Star Award	Popular Male Singer	Won
2019	2019 IKIM Nasyid Award	Favorite Solo Artist	Won
2019	2019 IKIM Nasyid Award	Favorite Song (Cahaya 114)	Won
2020	33rd Daily News Popular Star Award	Popular Male Singer	Nominated
2020	33rd Daily News Popular Star Award	Popular Collaboration/Duo/Group Artist (with Siti Nordiana)	Won
2020	33rd Daily News Popular Star Award	Popular FC FANtastik (khaibaharempire)	Nominated
2020	2020 Era MeleTOP Award	Male MeleTOP Singer	Nominated
2020	2020 Era MeleTOP Award	MeleTOP Group/Duo (with Siti Nordiana)	Won
2020	2020 Era MeleTOP Award	Top Top MeleTOP Group/Duo (with Siti Nordiana)	Won
2020	JOOX Music Awards (Year End 2020)	Top 5 Local Hits (single Durja)	Won
2020	JOOX Music Awards (Year End 2020)	Top 5 Local Artist	Won
2021	34th Berita Harian Popular Star Award	Popular Male Singer	Nominated
2021	34th Berita Harian Popular Star Award	Popular Collaboration/Duo/Group Artist (with Aina Abdul)	Won
2021	34th Berita Harian Popular Star Award	Popular FC FANtastik (khaibaharempire)	Nominated
2021	34th Berita Harian Popular Star Award	Popular TikTok Artist	Won
2021	MeleTOP Era 2021 Award	Singer MeleTOP Era (Durja)	Won
2021	MeleTOP Era 2021 Award	MeleTOP Program (This Week's Concert #123 Khai Bahar RTM)	Won
2021	MeleTOP Era 2021 Award	Top Top MeleTOP (Men)	Won
2021	JOOX Music Awards (Mid Year 2021)	Top Fans Pick	Won
2021	JOOX Music Awards (Mid Year 2021)	Top 5 Local Artists	Won
2021	JOOX Music Awards (Year End 2021)	Top 5 Local Hits (Sengsara single)	Won
2021	JOOX Music Awards (Year End 2021)	Top 5 Local Artists	Won
2022	Anugerah Juara Lagu Ke-36	Popular Chosen Singer Oppo AJL (Nafas Cinta feat Aina Abdul)	Won
2022	Anugerah Juara Lagu Ke-36	Nafas Cinta duet Aina Abdul	Finalist
2022	IKIM Nasyid Awards 2022	Favorite Solo Artist	Won
2022	IKIM Nasyid Awards 2022	Favorite Song (Ratuku)	Won
2022	Anugerah Industri Muzik Ke-23	Best Pop Song (Farewell)	Nominated
2023	Anugerah Juara Lagu Ke-37	Popular Favorite Singer Alha Alfa AJL (Sengsara)	Won
2023	Anugerah Juara Lagu Ke-37	Sengsara	Finalist
2023	2023 Sangat Drama Awards	Best OST (Nafas Cinta ft Aina Abdul) Drama Kekasih Hati Mr Bodyguard	Won
2023	35th Daily News Popular Star Awards	Male Singer Popular	Won
2024	Gempak Most Wanted Awards 2023	Best Music Video (Selagi Ku Ada with Nabila Razali)	Won (Note: Khai took the award as a representative)
2024	Anugerah Juara Lagu Ke-38	Selagi Ku Ada duet Nabila Razali	Finalist
2024	36th Daily News Popular Star Award	Popular Male Singer	Won
2024	36th Daily News Popular Star Award	Popular Collaboration Artist/Duo/Group (with Nabila Razali)	Nominated
2024	36th Daily News Popular Star Award	Popular Collaboration Artist/Duo/Group (with Adira Suhaimi)	Nominated

== Endorsement ==
Year	Product	Note
2017	Perfume Bayang Limited Edition	Perfume
2018,2019	C_Clean Plus by Khai Bahar	Facial care
2018	NIVEA for MEN by NIVEA	Body care
2019	Far8 by Altelia Amani	Baju Melayu / Kurta
2018 - 2022	Toyota Gazoo Racing (5 seasons) by Toyota Group	Celebrity racer
2021	Igaiss mango flavored drink	Beverage Products
2021	Car perfume by Vanzo Group	Car fragrance products
2022	Choco product/snacks by ChocoAlbab	Food Products
2022	Elrah Exclusive	Malay clothes
2023 - 2024	Alicafe Power root	Beverage Products
2024	Nongshim Shin Ramyun	Food Products

== Business ==
Year	Product	Note
2021-2022	K Slimz by Khai Bahar	Health Drink Products
2021-2022	Ayo Chicken with Ayo Chicken Group	Food Products
