= Akademi Fantasia season 10 =

Akademi Fantasia
- Season 10
- Hosted by: Zizan Razak; Hefny Sahad; Hanis Zalikha
- Judges: Edry Abdul Halim; Sharifah Amani; Roslan Aziz
- Winner: Mohd Faizul Sany
- Runner-up: Azhael (Hal Husaini Razmi & Mohd Azhar Osman)
- Finals venue: Stadium Negara, Kuala Lumpur

Release
- Original network: Astro Ria
- Original release: 14 September – 17 November 2013

Season chronology
- ← Previous; Season 9 Next → Season 11

The tenth season of Akademi Fantasia, also branded as AF2013, premiered on 14 September 2013 and concluded on 17 November 2013 on the Astro Ria television channel. The season introduced Zizan Razak as host along with the new judging panel, Edry Abdul Halim, Sharifah Amani and Roslan Aziz.

This season is used a new format and different from previous seasons of Akademi Fantasia, this season is searching a new singing talent, both solo and duo, in Malaysia. Apart from that, this season are open to Singaporean. Unlike previous season which used Principle as head trainers, this season have "Inspirer", which include Faizal Tahir (Week 1–3), Melly Goeslaw (Week 4–6) and Siti Nurhaliza (Week 7–10).

On 17 November 2013, Mohd Faizul Sany from Tawau, Sabah was announced as the season's winner and male duo, Azhael was the runner-up.

== Auditions ==
Auditions were held in the following cities:

- The Zon Hotel, Johor Bahru – 1 & 2 June 2013
- Vistana Hotel, Penang – 8 & 9 June 2013
- Merdeka Palace Hotel, Kuching, Sarawak – 15 & 16 June 2013
- Promenade Hotel, Kota Kinabalu, Sabah – 22 & 23 June 2013
- SACC, Shah Alam, Selangor – 29 & 30 June 2013

-Candidates are free to sing any genre of song.
-Participants also can submit their entries online by submit the link of their video (which has been uploaded into YouTube) via AF2013's Official Website.
-Contestants were required to be between the ages of 18 and 35, and are Malaysian and Singaporean citizens.

== Students ==
(ages stated are at time of contest)

| Student | Age | Hometown | Rank |
|---|---|---|---|
| Mohd Faizul Sani (Faizul) | 28 | Tawau, Sabah | Champion |
| Hal Husaini Bin Razmi & Mohd Azhar Bin Osman (Azhael) | 25 | Kuala Lumpur | Runner Up |
| Nadia Amira Othman (Amira) | 20 | Johor | Third |
| Siti Ruhailah Hussein (Indah) | 23 | Johor | 4th |
| Nur Nabila Razali (Nabila) | 21 | Kuala Lumpur | 5th |
| Aisyah Aziz (Aisyah) | 19 | Singapore | 6th |
| Abdul Suhadah Unding (Suhada) | 21 | Sabah | 7th |
| Irsa Sahabuddin & Irmiza Sahabuddin (Irmisa) | 26 & 23 | Sabah | 8th |
| Rasmawatie Mohd Thamrin (Nona) | 18 | Sabah | 9th |
| Muhammad Ikhtiman Che Ismail (Iman) | 23 | Kedah | 10th |
| Chin Teik Meng (Darren) | 21 | Penang | 11th |
| Kamsani Jumahat (Sani) | 23 | Singapore | 12th |

== Concert Summaries ==
=== Week 1 ===
Theme: 15 Malaysian Icon
Original Airdate: 14 September 2013

| Student | Song | Result |
|---|---|---|
| Aisyah | "Coba" (Faizal Tahir) | Safe |
| Amira | "Ratuku" (Awie) | Safe |
| Azhael | "Bukan Cinta Biasa" (Siti Nurhaliza) | Safe |
| Darren | "Sedetik Lebih" (Anuar Zain) | Safe |
| Faizul | "Dan Sebenarnya" (Yuna) | Safe |
| Iman | "Kejoraku Bersatu" (Search) | Safe |
| Indah | "Ku Akui" (Hafiz) | Safe |
| Irmisa | "Cinta Di Akhir Garisan" (Ziana Zain, Ning Baizura, Nora & Dessy) | Safe |
| Nabila | "Gemilang" (Ella) | Safe |
| Nona | "Tiada Kepastian" (Ziana Zain) | Safe |
| Sani | "Gemilang" (Jaclyn Victor) | Eliminated |
| Suhada | "Apa Saja" (KRU) | Safe |

- Eliminated: Sani

=== Week 2 ===
Theme: 15 Malaysian Icon
Original Airdate: 21 September 2013

| Student | Song | Result |
|---|---|---|
| Aisyah | "Iris" (Awie) | Safe |
| Amira | "Pastikan" (Siti Nurhaliza) | Safe |
| Azhael | "Sepi Sekuntum Mawar Merah" (Ella) | Safe |
| Darren | "Mentera Semerah Padi" (M. Nasir) | Eliminated |
| Faizul | "Pasti" (Ning Baizura) | Safe |
| Iman | "Terukir Di Bintang" (Yuna) | Safe |
| Indah | "Sinaran" (Sheila Majid) | Safe |
| Irmisa | "Kekasih Awal dan Akhir" (Jamal Abdillah) | Safe |
| Nabila | "Setia Ku Disini" (Ziana Zain) | Safe |
| Nona | "Selamat Malam" (Faizal Tahir) | Safe |
| Suhada | "Bahagiamu Deritaku" (Hafiz) | Safe |

- Eliminated: Darren

=== Week 3 ===
Original Airdate: 29 September 2013

| Student | Song | Result |
|---|---|---|
| Aisyah | "Tunggu Sekejap" (P. Ramlee) | Safe |
| Amira | "Getaran Jiwa" (P. Ramlee) | Safe |
| Azhael | "Khayalan" (Ruffedge) | Safe |
| Faizul | "Gerimis Mengundang" (Slam) | Safe |
| Iman | "Noktah Cinta" (Hafiz) | Eliminated |
| Indah | "Pelitaku" (Zur Edha) | Safe |
| Irmisa | "Sebelah Jiwaku" (Jaclyn Victor) | Safe |
| Nabila | "Berlari " (Tomok) | Safe |
| Nona | "Srikandi Cintaku" (Bloodshed) | Safe |
| Suhada | "Belaian Jiwa" (Innuendo) | Safe |

- Eliminated: Iman

=== Week 4 ===
Original Airdate: 6 October 2013

| Student | Song | Result |
|---|---|---|
| Aisyah | "Hanya Aku" (Hyper Act) | Safe |
| Amira | "Ya Maulai" (Siti Nurhaliza) | Safe |
| Azhael | "Relakan Jiwa" (Hazama) | Safe |
| Faizul | "I Love You" (Najwa Latif) | Safe |
| Indah | "Putih-Putih Melati" (ST12) | Safe |
| Irmisa | "Angin Syurga" (Misha Omar) | Safe |
| Nabila | "Aku Yang Tersakiti" (Judika) | Safe |
| Nona | "Treasure" (Bruno Mars) | Eliminated |
| Suhada | "Hatiku Hampa" (Ungu) | Safe |

- Eliminated: Nona

=== Week 5 ===
Original Airdate: 13 October 2013

| Student | Song | Result |
|---|---|---|
| Aisyah | "Ada Apa Dengan Cinta" (Melly Goeslow) | Safe |
| Amira | "Skyfall" (Adele) | Safe |
| Azhael | "Pencinta Wanita" (Irwansyah) | Safe |
| Faizul | "Ajari Aku" (Anuar Zain) | Safe |
| Indah | "Pergi" (Aizat) | Safe |
| Irmisa | "My Heart" (Irwansyah & Acha Septriasa) | Safe |
| Nabila | "Wajah Rahsia Hati" (Fauziah Ahmad Daud) | Safe |
| Suhada | "Aku Mahu Dia" (Hazama) | Safe |

- No Elimination

=== Week 6 ===
Original Airdate: 20 October 2013

| Student | Song | Result |
|---|---|---|
| Aisyah | "Ikut Rentakku" (Jaclyn Victor) | Safe |
| Amira | "Terima Kasih" (IAmNeeta) | Safe |
| Azhael | "Kita" (Forteen) | Safe |
| Faizul | "Cinta Ini Membunuhku" (D'Masiv) | Safe |
| Indah | "Ku Menunggu" (Rossa) | Safe |
| Irmisa | "Teman Tapi Mesra" (Ratu) | Eliminated |
| Nabila | "Lovefool" (The Cardigans) | Safe |
| Suhada | "Madu 3" (Ahmad Dhani) | Safe |

- Eliminated: Irmisa

=== Week 7 ===
Theme: Duet
Original Airdate: 27 October 2013

| Student | Song | Result |
|---|---|---|
| Aisyah & Hafiz | "Sembunyi" (Misha Omar & Andy Flop Poppy) | Safe |
| Amira & Hazama | "Mendung Tak Bererti Hujan" (Ella & Deddy Dores) | Safe |
| Azhael & Stacy | "Menggegar Dunia" (Adam & Stacy) | Safe |
| Faizul & Adira | "Penghujung Cintaku" (Pasha Ungu & Adelia) | Safe |
| Indah & Aril | "Terlanjur Cinta" (Pasha Ungu & Rossa) | Safe |
| Nabila & Alif Satar | "Keliru" (Ajai & Nurul) | Safe |
| Suhada & Mila | "Hanya Memuji" (Shanty & Marcell) | Eliminated |

- Eliminated: Suhada

=== Week 8 ===
Original Airdate: 2 November 2013

First Round

| Student | Song | Result |
|---|---|---|
| Aisyah | "Price Tag" (Jessie J) | Safe |
| Amira | "Awan Yang Terpilu" (Ning Baizura) | Safe |
| Azhael | "Harus Terpisah" (Chakra Khan) | Safe |
| Faizul | "Sandiwara Cinta" (Republik) | Safe |
| Indah | "Jangan Kau Mimpi" (Siti Sarah) | Safe |
| Nabila | "Gelombang" (Salamiah Hassan) | Safe |

Second Round

Battle Round

| Student | Song |
|---|---|
| Aisyah vs Amira | "Elegi Sepi" (Azharina) |
| Nabila vs Indah | "Sangkar Cinta" (Ziana Zain) |
| Azhael vs Faizul | "Nakal" (Gigi) |

- No elimination

=== Week 9 ===
Theme: Solo & Rock
Original Airdate: 10 November 2013

| Student | Song | Result |
|---|---|---|
| Aisyah | "Matahariku" (Agnes Monica) & "Suci Dalam Debu" (Iklim) | Safe |
| Amira | "Tak Mungkin Kerna Sayang" (Alyah) & "Opera Hidup" (Wings) | Safe |
| Azhael | "Lelaki Ini" (Anuar Zain) & "Kembali Merindu" (Slam) | Eliminated |
| Faizul | "Hilang Naluri" (Once) & "Bayangan Gurauan" (Mega) | Safe |
| Indah | "Firework" (Katy Perry) & "Segalanya Ku Terima" (Ilusi) | Bottom 2 |
| Nabila | "Tentang Rasa" (Astrid) & "Permata Biru" (Ella) | Safe |

- Eliminated: Azhael

=== Week 10 (Final) ===
Original Airdate: 17 November 2013

| Student | Song | New Song | Result |
|---|---|---|---|
| Aisyah | "Lebih Indah" (Siti Nurhaliza) | "Mimpi" (composed & lyrics by Faizal Tahir) | Sixth |
| Amira | "Terlalu Istimewa" (Adibah Noor) | "Sesaat Untukku" (composed by Keroz Nazri & lyrics by Erda EE) | Third |
| Azhael | "Penglipur Lara" (Hazama) | "Hentian Terakhir" (composed by Damien VE & lyrics by Altimet) | Runner-up |
| Faizul | "Hanyut" (Faizal Tahir) | "Sepasang Sayap" (composed & lyrics by Amir Jahari) | Winner |
| Indah | "Jagalah Diri" (Jaclyn Victor) | "Percayalah" (composed by Aiman & lyrics by Mohd Atlas) | Fourth |
| Nabila | "Seandai Masih Ada Cinta" (Dayang Nurfaizah) | "Katakan Saja" (composed by Zul Mahat & lyrics by Habsah Kamis) | Fifth |

- Azhael was re-entered into the competition after scoring the highest votes through AFMASUK.

== Elimination chart ==
| Rank | Weekly Concerts | | | | | | | | | | |
| Rank | Student | 1 (14/9) | 2 (21/9) | 3 (29/9) | 4 (16/10) | 5 (13/10) | 6 (20/10) | 7 (27/10) | 8 (2/11) | 9 (10/11) | Final (17/11) |

== Cast members ==
=== Hosts ===
- Zizan Razak – Host of concert of Akademi Fantasia
- Hefny Sahad – Diari Akademi Fantasia
- Hanis Zalikha – TGI AF & AF Buzz

=== Professional trainers ===
- Faizal Tahir, Melly Goeslow, & Siti Nurhaliza – Inspirer
- Shafizawati Sharif – Vocal Presentation
- Alam Wakaka & Suhaili- Choreographer
- Fizz Fairuz – Drama & Acting

=== Judges ===
- Edry Abdul Halim
- Sharifah Amani
- Roslan Aziz

== Season statistics ==
- Total number of students: 12 (14)
- Oldest student: Faizul Sany, 28 years old
- Youngest students: Rasmawatie Mohd Thamrin, 18 years old
