= Amelin (surname) =

Amelin (Russian: Амелин, Ukrainian: Амеліна) is a Slavic masculine surname, its feminine counterpart is Amelina. Notable people with the surname include:

- Alla Amelina (born 1952, fl. 1993), member of the 1st Russian State Duma
- Anatoly Amelin (born 1946), Soviet table tennis player
- Jérémy Amelin (born 1986), French recording artist and entertainer
- Laima Balaišytė (born 1948, married name Amelin), Lithuanian table-tennis player
- Victoria Amelina (1986–2023), Ukrainian writer
