= Ismail Izzani =

Malaysian singer, songwriter, and actor (born 2000)

- Born: Ismail Izzani bin Zainal Nazeri; 13 April 2000 (age 26); Selangor, Malaysia
- Occupations: Singer; songwriter; actor
- Years active: 2017–present
- Height: 170 cm (5 ft 7 in)
- Parents: Zainal Nazeri (father); Suliza Salam (mother)
- Musical career
- Genres: Pop; R&B; Hip-hop
- Instruments: Vocals
- Labels: Def Jam Southeast Asia; Def Jam Malaysia; Universal Music Malaysia

Ismail Izzani bin Zainal Nazeri (born 13 April 2000) is a Malaysian singer, songwriter, and actor. He is the son of a veteran singer of the 1980s, Suliza Salam.

== Career ==
Ismail Izzani started making a name for himself when he was 17 years old, and started to become a phenomenon after his first single called "Sabar" produced by himself with Omar K, Adib Hamdi and Zyn became popular. As of August 2017, the music video for the song has been viewed over four million times after being uploaded on YouTube in February 2017.

Before Izzani ventured into singing, he received his early education at Setiabudi Primary School and Setiabudi Secondary School in Gombak. Ismail once joined the nasheed group at the schools. In the middle of 2016, he started attending home schooling to ensure that his career and study schedule went hand in hand and did not clash.

Izzani was supposed to sit for the Sijil Pelajaran Malaysia (SPM) exam in 2017. However, he did not have the opportunity to sit for the SPM exam that year due to registration problems.

Izzani launched a duet song with Siti Nordiana and two Indonesian artists namely Fatin Shidqia and Rizky Febian in conjunction with Eid al-Fitr entitled Raya Nusantara on 9 June 2017.

Izzani also dabbled in acting, starting his acting career through the telefilm Batang Buruk Lesung Batu, then starring in the dramas Kebaya Kasut Kanvas and Lelaki Lingkungan Cinta.

== Discography ==
=== Albums ===
- Ismail Izzani (2022)

=== Singles ===
==== As main artist ====
Year	Title	Album	Note
2017	"Sabar"	Single without album	
2017	"Demi Kita"	Single without album	
2018	"Luar Biasa (Parking Tepi)" (menampilkan Alif)	Single without album	
2018	"Teruskan Perjalanan" (bersama Altimet)	Single without album	
2018	"Save Me"	Single without album	
2018	"Bidadari"	Single without album	
2019	"Berserah" (bersama Zizan Razak)	Single without album	
2019	"Cinta"	Single without album	
2019	"Hello" (bersama Andi Bernadee)	Single without album	
2020	"Nyawa"	Single without album	
2020	"Sedih" (bersama Naim Daniel)	Single without album	
2020	"Ada Cara"	Single without album	
2021	"Contact" (bersama Izhar dan Quai)	Ismail Izzani	
2021	"Kamu"	Ismail Izzani	
2022	"Ape Ko Nak"	Ismail Izzani	
2024	"IMAN"		
2025	"Tenggelam"		

== Filmography ==
=== Film ===
Tahun	Tajuk	Watak	Catatan
2021	Dendam Penunggu	Zul	First film
TBA	Ammara Batrisya The Movie	Arif	

=== Drama ===
Year	Title	Character	TV Channel	Note
2020	Kebaya Kasut Kanvas	Mikail	TV3	First drama
2020	Lelaki Lingkungan Cinta	Zamri	TV3	
2021	Keluarga Epik	Syamsul	TV3	
2023	Bukan Hanya Sekadar Cinta	Isa Rafael	TV3	
TBA	Ammara Batrisya 2	Arif	TV3	
TBA	Ammara Batrisya 3	Arif	TV3	

=== Telefilm ===
Year	Title	Character	TV Channel	Note
2018	Batang Buruk Lesung Batu	Wanji	Astro Ria	
2019	Lelaki Kelas Sebelah	Anas	TV3	
2019	Cerita Raya Luar Biasa	Ismail	Astro Ria	
2020	Gangguan Psiko Stalker	Zafran	Astro Citra	
2023	Impak Maksima Underground	Arie	Tonton	

== Awards ==
Year	Award	Category	Nomination	Result
2018	Anugerah Bintang Popular Berita Harian ke-31	Artis Baru Lelaki Popular		Nominated
2018	Anugerah Bintang Popular Berita Harian ke-31	Penyanyi Lelaki Popular		Nominated
2023	Anugerah Bintang Popular Berita Harian ke-35	Penyanyi Lelaki Popular		Nominated
2023	Anugerah Bintang Popular Berita Harian ke-35	Couple Filem Popular	Dendam Penunggu	Nominated
2025	Anugerah Bintang Popular Berita Harian ke-37	Penyanyi Lelaki Popular		Nominated
