= Insomniacks =

Malaysian pop band

- Origin: Kuala Lumpur, Malaysia
- Genres: Pop rock; Punk rock; Pop
- Years active: 2015–present
- Labels: Sony Music Entertainment Malaysia (2017–2020); Universal Music Malaysia (2021–present)
- Members: Syed Mir Iqbal (Iqie); Wan Arif Iskandar (Iskandar); Danial Lee Hashim (Danial)
- Past members: Gavin Wong (Gavin)

Insomniacks is a Malaysian pop band from Kuala Lumpur. They rose to prominence with the release of their second single, "Pulang", in 2018, which charted on the Malaysian RIM streaming charts for 146 consecutive weeks, and a total of 185 weeks as of July 2022.

The group have cited 5 Seconds of Summer, Fall Out Boy, Day6, Mayday Parade and Paramore as influences.

== Career ==
=== History and formation ===
The band began as Dan's Band with Danial and Iqbal who were classmates at SMK St. John. Gavin joined as the drummer after being recommended to the duo by Iskandar (a schoolmate of Gavin's at Sekolah Sri KDU, and childhood friend of Iqbal's). Iskandar would later go on to join the band as their bassist.

Insomniacks formed in 2015. In November of that year, the quartet would begin posting videos of themselves performing covers of popular songs on their YouTube channel.

=== 2017–2024: Debut and mainstream success with "Pulang" ===
In 2017, they released their debut single, "Selalu", which was featured as part of the soundtrack of the Astro Ria drama, My Coffee Prince.

In 2018, the group released their second single, "Pulang". The group released the four-episode Pulang WEBisode webseries on their YouTube channel as part of their single promotions. "Pulang" achieved the record for most consecutive weeks on the RIM streaming charts. "Pulang" has been on the RIM Malay singles chart for 185 weeks, as of July 2022.

In 2019, Iqbal co-founded the Klang Valley-based music collective, Distorted (alias Distorted Material), alongside Jessel Phuah (Sino), Ariff Jazmi, Helloluqman of Block J (Jonah), and Nik Qayrel Aiman (Eneyeqay) of the duo Niqie. Iqbal goes by the alias Balo as part of Distorted.

Insomniacks were the fifth most streamed Malaysian artist on Spotify, in 2019.

In 2020, Insomniacks released their third single, "Kepala Batu" ahead of the release of their debut EP of the same name. "Kepala Batu" was composed in collaboration with prolific Malaysian singer-songwriter, Faizal Tahir. The lead single from the EP, "Reminisensi", was the first song Insomniacks wrote as a band.

After four years signed with Sony Music Malaysia, their contract expired in 2020. They consequently signed with Universal Music Malaysia in March 2021. On 14 February 2022, Insomniacks released, "Sempurna". The single peaked at number 1 on the RIM Malay singles streaming chart and number 5 on Billboard's Malaysia Songs chart.

Since March 2022, Gavin has not been participating in "Sempurna" promotions with the band. On 12 June 2022, it was announced in a statement on his and the band's social media that he would be taking an extended hiatus from the band and will not be part of any upcoming projects.

The band released their first single as a trio, "Igauan Malam", on 4 November 2022.

In 2024, Insomniacks released their latest EP titled Teman, featuring eight tracks: Sayang/Cinta, Teman, Cerita Kita (a collaboration with Nabila Razali), Igauan Malam, Belum Mulai (featuring Nabila Taqiyyah), Temani Hati, Dimana, and Sempurna.

=== 2025–Present: Awake and Dreaming ===
In January 2025, Insomniacks released their first English-language extended play, Awake & Dreaming. The track "Awake and Dreaming" holds special significance as it was the very first song the band wrote together ten years earlier, during the formation of the group. The EP focuses on themes of mental health, an issue the band consider to be highly important in today’s society.

Their collaboration with Nabila Taqiyyah, "Belum Mulai", earned them the award for Best Music Video at the 2025 Gempak Most Wanted Awards. To celebrate their 10th anniversary as a band, Insomniacks also announced their first solo concert, which took place on 12 July 2025 at Zepp KL. At the same time, Insomniacks revealed their 2025 single titled ‘’Seperti Dulu’’, dedicated to their loyal fan club who have supported them from the beginning until now.

In 2026, they released their new single, "Bersuara", a duet with Yonnyboii as well as an English-language single titled "Love Me Or Not", which has been played on Hitz FM, Era FM and Hot FM.

2026 also marks the pre-launch of their new album, accompanied by the "Insomniacks Album Tour 2026." This tour aims to usher in a new chapter of their musical journey for fans across three Malaysian cities: Loft29 in Pulau Pinang (September 19, 2026), Embrace Hall (Taman Impian Emas) in Johor Bahru (October 3, 2026) , and Odeon in Kuala Lumpur (October 31, 2026). Furthermore, the Johor Bahru show remarks with recorded exceptional ticket demand and reached a full sell-out on that day. These events offer fans the opportunity to witness live performances and celebrate the launch of the new album.

More than just a standard concert series, the event is designed to strengthen the bond between Insomniacks and their fans. Each tour stop will feature an exclusive listening experience, allowing fans to enjoy songs from the new album ahead of its official release.

== Members ==
Adapted from Hitz:

=== Active ===
- Iqie (Syed Mir Iqbal; born 3 June 1997 in Kuala Lumpur) – lead vocals, guitar
- Iskandar (Wan Arif Iskandar; born 9 September 1997 in Westminster, London) – guitar, bass, vocals
- Danial (Danial Lee Hashim; born 25 February 1997 in Kuala Lumpur) – rhythm guitar, vocals

=== Former ===
- Gavin (Gavin Wong; born 27 December 1997 in Kuala Lumpur) – drums, cajon, guitar

== Discography ==
=== Extended plays ===
Title	EP details	Track list
Kepala Batu EP	Released: 24 July 2020; Label: Sony Music Malaysia; Formats: Digital download, streaming	1. "Here Again"; 2. "Reminisensi"; 3. "Langgar"; 4. "Kepala Batu"; 5. "Selalu"
Teman EP	Released: 8 August 2024; Label: Universal Music Malaysia; Formats: Digital download, streaming, CD	1. "Sayang/Cinta; 2. "Teman"; 3. "Cerita Kita"; 4. "Igauan Malam"; 5. "Belum Mulai"; 6. "Temani Hati"; 7. "Dimana"; 8. "Sempurna"
Awake & Dreaming EP	Released: 31 January 2025; Label: Universal Music Malaysia; Formats: Digital download, streaming	1. "Anti-Hero (Welcome To My Nightmare)”; 2. "Awake & Dreaming”; 3. "Overdrive"; 4. "Some Days Are Just Better"; 5. "Why Don’t U cry?"

=== Singles ===
==== As lead artist ====
List of singles as lead artist, with selected chart positions, showing year released and album name
Title	Year	Peak chart positions		Album
Title	Year	MYS		Album
Title	Year	RIM (Note: The Top 10 Domestic Singles chart was reconfigured into a Malay songs charts, starting the week ending 24 March 2022.)	Song (Note: The Billboard's Hits of the World charts launched and were first issued on the date February 19, 2022.)	Album
"Selalu"	2017	–	—N/a	Kepala Batu EP
"Pulang"	2018	1	—N/a	Non-album single
"Kepala Batu"	2020	–	—N/a	Kepala Batu EP
"Reminisensi"	2020	3	3	Kepala Batu EP
"Pulang" (Reimagined)	2021	–	–	Non-album singles
"Reminisensi" (Reimagined)	2021	–	– (Note: Original version of "Reminisensi" peaked at #3 on the Malaysia Songs Billboard Chart)	Non-album singles
"Sempurna"	2022	1	5	Teman EP
"Igauan Malam"	2022	6	–	Teman EP
"Lagu Raya"	2023			Non-album single
"Cerita Kita" (with Nabila Razali)	2023			Teman EP
"Teman"	2024			Teman EP
"Belum Mulai" (with Nabila Taqqiyah)	2024			Teman EP
"Some Days Are Just Better"	2024			Awake & Dreaming EP
"Overdrive" (with Killa Driz)	2025			Awake & Dreaming EP
“Seperti Dulu”	2025			Non-album single
"Bersuara" (with Yonnyboii)	2026			
"Love Me Or Not"	2026			Non-album single
"—" denotes a recording that did not chart or was not released in that territory.

==== As featured artist ====
List of singles as featured artist, showing year released and album name
Title	Year	Album
"Go There If You Miss Me" (Night Skies & Visions feat. Iqie of Insomniacks)	2020	Non-album single

=== Music videos ===
Title	Year	Director(s)
"Selalu"	2017	Unknown
"Pulang"	2018	Thaqif Saadon
"Pulang" (Piano Version)	2019	Thaqif Saadon
"Kepala Batu"	2020	Thaqif Saadon
"Reminisensi" Lyric video	2020	Unknown
"Sempurna"	2022	Thaqif Saadon
"Igauan Malam"	2022	Thaqif Saadon
"Lagu Raya"	2023	Suhana Osman
"Cerita Kita"	2023	Lily Samsuddin
"Teman"	2024	Dick Wai
"Belum Mulai"	2024	Idho Aruan
"Temani Hati"	2024	Idho Aruan
"Some Days Are Just Better"	2024	Jasmine Wong
"Overdrive"	2025	Jinq Rui
"Seperti Dulu" Lyric video	2025	Andrew Lim
"Love Me Or Not"	2026	Fiqzakaria

== Awards and nominations ==
Year	Organisation	Category	Nominee/nominated work	Result	Ref.
2018	Anugerah Planet Muzik	Best Band	Insomniacks	Nominated	
2019	32nd Anugerah Bintang Popular Berita Harian	Most Popular Group	Insomniacks	Nominated	
2020	Anugerah MeleTOP Era 2020	MeleTOP New Artist	Insomniacks	Nominated	
2025	Gempak Most Wanted Awards 2024	Muzik Video Tergempak	Insomniacks	Won	
