= Jamal Abdillah =

Malaysian pop singer and actor (born 1959)

Yang Hormat Dato' Jamal Abdillah DIMP
- جمال عبيدﷲ
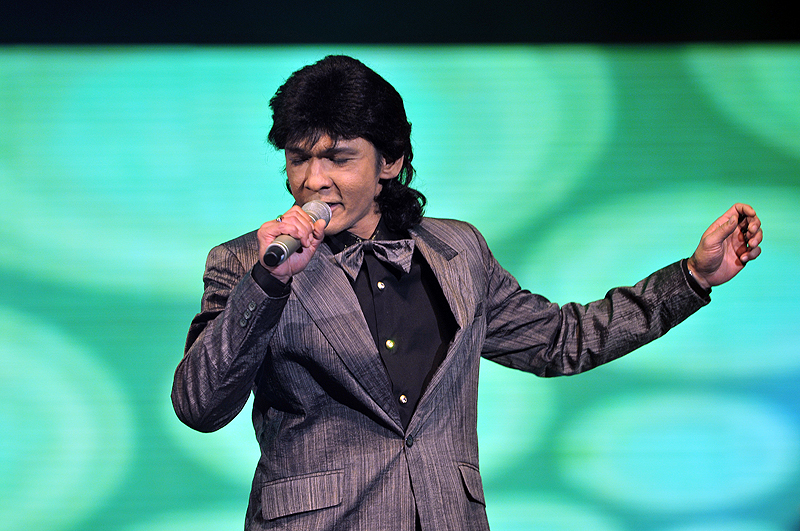
- Abdillah performing in 2008
- Born: Jamal Ubaidillah bin Haji Mohd Ali; 7 May 1959 (age 67); Telok Anson, Perak, Federation of Malaya, (now Teluk Intan, Perak, Malaysia)
- Other names: Jamal Abdillah; King of Pop Malaysia
- Occupations: Singer; actor
- Years active: 1973–present
- Spouses: Basariah Abdul Latiff (divorced) Noraina Che Yusoff (divorced) Fatimatuzahra Abdul Samad (divorced); Datin Zai Izzati Khiruddin (m. 2017)
- Children: 7
- Musical career
- Genres: Pop; Malaysian pop
- Instrument: Vocals
- Labels: EMI; Warner Music Malaysia

Dato' Jamal Ubaidillah bin Haji Mohd Ali (born 7 May 1959), known by his stage name Jamal Abdillah, is a Malaysian pop singer and actor with a "bad boy" image.

Jamal began his singing career in 1973. He won Radio Televisyen Malaysia's Bintang RTM competition in 1979. Following his victory, he continued to sing but also appeared in films such as 'Azura'.

Jamal is the eldest of seven siblings. Having married four times, Jamal has four sons, Osama Yamani (known as Yamani Abdillah), Ahmad Zaki Yamani, El Isaac Yamani, and Iskandar Rayyan Yamani; and three daughters, Nur Azura Yamani, Rahil Laura Salsabila Yamani and Magdalena Yamani.

He is of Banjar descent. He has performed in Indonesia, Singapore and Brunei Darussalam. He regularly performs charity concerts in Singapore every year.

== Discography ==
Studio albums

- Perpisahan Tanpa Relamu (1980)
- Derita Cinta (1981)
- Hatiku Luka Kembali (1982)
- Layang-Layang (1983)
- Sendiri (1984)
- Mati Hidup Semula (1986)
- Untukmu (1988)
- Sepi Seorang Perindu (1989)
- Seniman Menangis (1990)
- Jamal (1991)
- Penghujung Rindu (1994)
- Suratan Kasih / Penawar Kasih (1995 / 1997)
- Samrah (1998)
- Segala Cinta (2002)
- Aku Penghibur (2005)
- Tak Hilang Cinta (2009)
- Raja Pop 2 (2011)

Singles

- "Aku Maafkan Kamu" feat Malique Ibrahim (2011)
- "Belenggu Rindu" feat Wany Hasrita (2019)

== Filmography ==
=== Film ===
Year	Title	Role	Notes
1980	Toyol	Singer Invitations	Special appearance
1984	Azura	Zack/Zakaria	
1989	Tuah	Hang Tuah/ASP Sazali	
1991	Sejati	Bani	
1993	Kekasih Awal dan Akhir	Yusman	
1996	Suratan Kasih	Sunny/Said Helmi	
1997	Ghazal Untuk Rabiah	Jamal/Salman	

=== Television ===
Year	Title	Role	TV channel	Notes
1990	Jenakarama	Himself	TV1	
2012	Bicara – with Daud Yusof	Himself	Mediacorp Suria	Special appearance
2015	Konsert Nostagia Dato' Jamal Abdillah	Himself	TV1	
2016	Konsert 2 Dimensi	Himself	TV1	with Dato' M. Nasir
2017	Sepahtu Reunion Live	Himself	Astro Warna	
2019	Sepahtu Reunion Live	Himself	Astro Warna	
2019	Cinta Overhaul Aidilfitri	Zakaria	Astro Warna	
