= Wany Hasrita =

Malaysian singer (born 1992)

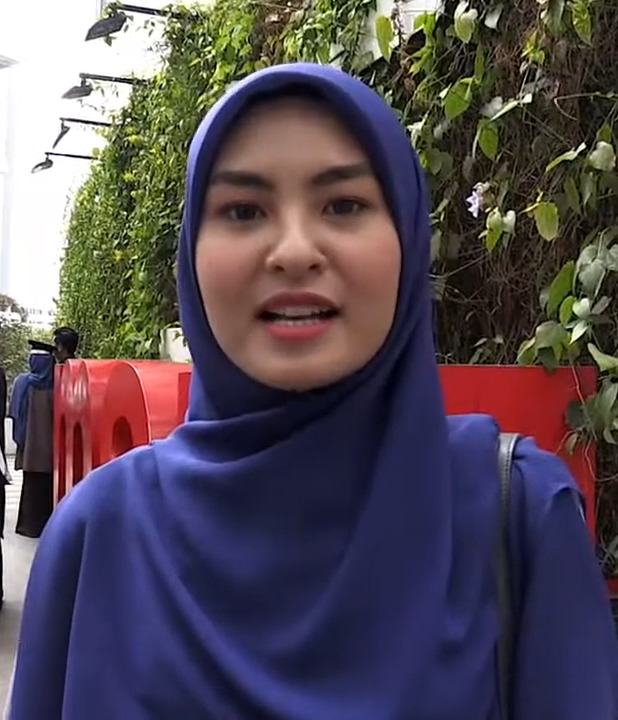
- Born: Nurshazwany Hasrita binti Hasbullah; 24 December 1992 (age 33); Kuala Lumpur Hospital, Kuala Lumpur, Malaysia
- Education: Management & Science University (BMSc)
- Occupations: Singer; Actress; Television Host
- Years active: 2016–present
- Spouse: Mohd Al-Adib Fahmi Harun (m. 2022)
- Children: 1
- Parent(s): Norita Jaafar; Hasbullah Hassan
- Musical career
- Genres: Ballad; pop
- Instrument: Vocals
- Labels: FMC Music; Trinity Optima Production (Indonesia)

Nurshazwany Hasrita Hasbullah (born 24 December 1992) is a singer, actress and television host from Malaysia who gained popularity after her debut hit, "Menahan Rindu." She was voted the 31st Anugerah Bintang Popular Berita Harian (ABPBH)'s Most Popular Star in addition to winning the Popular Female Singer category.

== Career ==
In 2012, Wany started posting her singing videos to the Smule app, which led to her social media fame. Her debut track "Menahan Rindu" has over 35 million views on YouTube. In contrast, more than 15 million people saw the duet song "Disana Cinta Disini Rindu" with Tajul Ariff. Through the first telefilm adaptation of her play, she also made a contribution to the world of acting. On 9 June 2018, Tergantung Rindu, a play by Haqiem Rusli and Tajul Ariff, had her own character and was aired on Astro Citra and Astro Mustika HD.

Wany completed her professional portfolio by appearing on TV3 in a role as a lawyer created by Sembang Sahur, costarring alongside Dayah Bakar, Shuk Sahar, and Issey Fazlisham. She was named the Most Popular Star at the 31st Daily News Popular Star Award, which is a huge achievement in her artistic career. She has an official fan group called WanyHasnizers that consistently support her work. The actor's nine-year winning streak as the Most Popular Star was broken with this triumph. Siti Nurhaliza was the singer's previous major category winner at the 22nd ABPBH.

Wany made her debut in 2019 with the Raya song "Menanti di Aidilfitri," which she co-wrote with Muna Shahirah, Wan Azlyn, and Wani Syaz. To promote this song, a music video featuring Azhan Rani has also been released. A duet with Wani Syaz is featured on her track "Sinar Terindah," which was also released. On 2 November 2019, Wany, Sufian Suhaimi, and Khai Bahar hosted the 2019 TRIO Concert at Malawati Stadium in Shah Alam.

The recording label FMC Music said on 5 February 2021, via their official Facebook page, that her music video "Cinta Khayalan" will be made available on YouTube officially on the following day at 8 p.m. Her performances of the songs "Canggung" and "Belenggu Rindu" (a duet with Jamal Abdillah) earned him a spot in the final half of Music-Muzik 2021. "Belenggu Rindu" placed third while also being chosen for the 35th Song Champion Award final ranking.

Wany and Wani Syaz once more worked together on the duet song "Sang Purnama" on 20 January 2022. The love tale of Adam and Eve served as the inspiration for the song composed by Sang Hitam, Mas Dewangga and Aden King. Sang Hitam also wrote the lyrics.

== Personal life ==
Wany was raised in Cheras and was born in the Kuala Lumpur Hospital. Wany went to the same high school as Eric Fuzi of the Floor 88 music group, SMK Bandar Damai Perdana. Wany completed her Bachelor of Medical Sciences degree at the University of Management and Science. She stated that as a novice businesswoman, she was prepared to take on risks and hear complaints about the things he released.

Wany announced on Instagram on 20 September 2020, that he has purchased a two-story home in Semenyih, after obtaining the developer's house key. She disclosed that both her and her mother have been tested positive for COVID-19 on 12 July 2022.

Wany formally wed Mohd Al-Adib Fahmi bin Harun on 22 July 2022. Earlier on 26 February, the two had been engaged before. On Saturday, 8 July 2023, at around 7:14 p.m., she gave birth to a girl at Aishah Al Iman Medical Centre in Kuala Lumpur.

== Filmography ==
=== Television ===
Year	Title	Role	Broadcast	Notes
2018	Sembang Sahur	Pengacara	TV3	With Issey Fazlisham, Shuk Sahar and Dayah Bakar
2021	Borak Dulu Baru Buka	Pengacara	TV1	With Amin Idris
2021	Sepahtu Reunion Al-Raya	Cik Nana	Astro Warna	Pick-up artist
2021	Sepahtu Reunion Live	Natasha	Astro Warna	Episode: "Mencari Sepatu Yang Hilang"
2022–present	Borak Dulu Baru Buka #barakahnyadisini	Pengacara	TV1 / TV Okey	With Amin Idris and Khir Rahman
2023	Apa Nak Masak Ni?	Pengacara	TV3	With her husband

=== Television movies ===
Year	Title	Role	Broadcast	Notes
2018	Tergantung Rindu	Herself	Astro Citra	Drama broadcast of the Month of Ramadan
2019	Cerita Raya Luar Biasa	Herself	Astro Ria	Aidilfitri Day Broadcast Drama
2021	Jin	Ayu	Astro Citra	Exclusive on Astro Citra

=== Discography ===
Year	Title	Composer	Lyricist
2016	"Memori Berkasih" Korean version (with Kim Dong Gyun)	Patrick Khamis	Patrick Khamis and Kim Dong Gyun
2016	"Menahan Rindu"	Ibnu and Gouffran	Ibnu and Gouffran
2017	"Disana Cinta Disini Rindu" (with Tajul Ariff)	Patrick Khamis	Patrick Khamis
2017	"Lebaran Terindah"	Ibnu	Ibnu and Gouffran
2017	"Rintihan Rindu"	Ibnu and Gouffran	Ibnu and Gouffran
2018	"Ewah-Ewah"	Pak Ngah	Siso
2018	"Rindu Dalam Benci" (with Tajul Ariff)	Patrick Khamis	Patrick Khamis
2018	"Semarak Syawal"	Pak Ngah	Ad Samad
2018	"Semaikan Cinta"	Wanz Baron	Gouffran
2018	"Aku Serius" (with Tajul Ariff)	Aidit Alfian	Teguh Budima
2019	"Terlalu Memuja"	Sharon Paul	Fedtri Yahya and Gouffran
2019	"Sinar Terindah" (with Wani Syaz)	Wani Syaz	Wany Hasrita
2019	"Menanti Di Aidilfitri"	DJ Fuzz	Waris
2019	"Belenggu Rindu" (with Dato' Jamal Abdillah)	Hael Husaini and Ezra Kong	Hael Husaini and Ezra Kong
2020	"Canggung"	Hael Husaini and Ezra Kong	Hael Husaini and Ezra Kong
2020	"Raikan Aidilfitri"	LY	Baiduri and Fedtri Yahya
2020	"Genderang Cinta"	-	-
2021	"Cinta Khayalan"	Farouk Roman	Amylea
2021	"Pedas" (with Sophia Liana)	Shazee	Altimet and Sophia Liana
2022	"Sang Purnama" (with Wani Syaz)	Sang Hitam, Mas Dewangga and Aden King	Sang Hitam
2022	"Kucuma" (with Dato' Jamal Abdillah)	A. Ramlee and Ezra Kong	A. Ramlee and Ezra Kong
2023	"Terpaling di Hari Raya" (with Tajul Ariff, Afieq Shazwan, Muna Shahirah, Tuah Adzmi & Wani Syaz)		
2023	"Wira Raya" (with Muna Shahirah & Wani Syaz)		
2023	"Sakitnya Penantian" (with Wani Syaz)		
