= Projek: High Council =

- Genre: Drama, teen drama, action
- Created by: Anwari Ashraf
- Written by: Mya Nasiruddin; Ruba Raj; Luqman Sheikh Ghazali; Samuel Sin; Zaharin Zabir; Adam Zainal; Zulaikha Zakaria; Zulaikha Zulhaimi
- Directed by: Anwari Ashraf; Zulaikha Zakaria
- Starring: Mierul Aiman; Amir Ahnaf; Nadhir Nasar; Naim Daniel; Yusof Hashim; Daiyan Trisha; Sazzy Falak
- Ending theme: "Test Drive" by Firdaus Rahmat (Episodes 1-4 & 9) "Kudrat" by Sekumpulan Orang Gila and Naim Daniel (Episodes 5-8 & 10)
- Country of origin: Malaysia
- Original language: Malay
- No. of episodes: 10

Production
- Production companies: Astro Shaw; Pasal Productions

Original release
- Network: Astro GO; Astro Ria
- Release: January 23 – March 27, 2023

Projek: High Council is a 2023 Malaysian television drama series created by Anwari Ashraf who also served as the co-director with Zulaikha Zakaria. Starring Mierul Aiman, Amir Ahnaf, Nadhir Nasar, Naim Daniel, Yusof Hashim and Daiyan Trisha, the series is the follow up to Projek: Anchor SPM (2021) and tells the story of gangsterism and school bullying in a boarding school which took inspiration from true stories. The series was aired as part of the Astro Originals brand and premiered on Astro GO from January 14 till 18 March 2023. The series is also known for propelling its two main casts, Mierul Aiman and Amir Ahnaf into stardom.

== Premise ==
Fakhri and Naim are two brothers that have been separated since their childhood and finally meet again at the Ungku Dermat College (Kolej Ungku Dermat; KUDRAT), a prestigious boarding school. Both joined a traditional competition called "Pilihanraya" (English: election) which is held secretly by the "High Council". The winner of the match would be named the most powerful student in KUDRAT.

In hopes to amend his own actions when he was 15, Fakhri—a brilliant but violent student—was admitted to KUDRAT. However, after uncovering the secrets behind the traditions of the school, he unknowingly becomes the main target of the students who aim to protect the "High Council" hierarchy. Fakhri joins the "pilihanraya" ring to determine the "KAPLA" (Ketua Asrama Pelajar Lelaki Atasan; English: Head of Senior Male Students' Dormitory) of the school, in hopes to stop the injustices and abuses of power among the students.

== Cast ==
=== Main ===
- Mierul Aiman as Fakhri, Naim's younger brother and new student at KUDRAT
- Nadhir Nasar as Naim, Fakhri's older brother
- Amir Ahnaf as Kahar, the KAPLA, main antagonist and Fakhri and Naim's senior
- Naim Daniel as Ayam, a soft-spoken KUDRAT student
- Kahoe Hon as Jayden
- Daiyan Trisha as Mia, Naim's lover and daughter of a canteen operator

=== Supporting ===
- Ameer Asyraf as Fahmi (Note: Also served as lead choreographer and coordinator)
- Yusof Hashim as Amirr, (Note: The name Amirr was inspired by the directors name, Amirr Shahlen) Naim's best friend
- Fazziq Muqris as Zahrin
- Sathisvaran as Prakash
- Fadhli Masoot as Hakeem, KAPLA Interim
- Nik Rifaie as Black
- Hazeeq Dean as Ariz
- Aida Aris as Idah, Fakhri and Naim's mother
- Azhar Sulaiman as Firdaus Ismet, Fakhri and Naim's father
- Ben Tan as Mr. Sin, KUDRAT warden
- Sazzy Falak as Ms. Faniza, Form 4 English teacher
- Muhammad Faizal as MA
- Hushairy Hussein as Dato' Abu Yamin, Kahar's father
- Hasnul Rahmat as Sir Yusof, KUDRAT principal
- Edika Yusof as Harun Jasni, Naim and Fakhri's stepfather

=== Guests ===
- Danish Zamri as young Fakhri
- Syed Irfan sebagai young Naim
- Muzayyin Mahyuddin as Ikhsan
- Shasha Abedul as Mia's friend, a canteen worker
- Sathiya as Prakash's father
- Danish Hazriq as Danial, a student who is always bullied by Ariz

== Episodes ==
No.	Title	Premiere date on Astro GO	Premiere date on Astro Ria
1	"Manifesto"	14 January 2023	23 January 2023
2	"Of Mice and Men"	21 January 2023	30 January 2023
3	"Bad Roots"	28 January 2023	6 February 2023
4	"Laid Bare"	4 February 2023	13 February 2023
5	"Ashes to Ashes"	11 February 2023	20 February 2023
6	"Predators"	18 February 2023	27 February 2023
7	"Power Trip"	25 February 2023	6 March 2023
8	"Kingdom of Flies"	4 March 2023	13 March 2023
9	"Parallels"	11 March 2023	20 March 2023
10	"Men Don't Cry"	18 March 2023	27 March 2023

== Production ==
Production began mid 2022 after pre-production which had started for almost a year. Nadhir Nasar and Daiyan Trisha, who worked on Projek: Anchor SPM, return but reprised different roles.

== Soundtrack ==
Projek: High Council features two theme songs titled "Test Drive" sung by Firdaus Rahmat and written by Iqie Hugh, Firdaus himself and Omar K and produced by World Peace Entertainment. "KUDRAT" was sung by Sekumpulan Orang Gila and Naim Daniel, written by Raja Nazrin Shah, Raja Nazmin Shah (Adek) and Naim himself.

No.	Title	Writer(s)	Length
1.	"Test Drive" (Firdaus Rahmat)	Iqie Hugh, Firdaus Rahmat, Omar K	3:44
2.	"KUDRAT" (Sekumpulan Orang Gila and Naim Daniel)	Raja Nazrin Shah, Raja Nazmin Shah, Naim Daniel	3:35
Total length:			7:19

== Release ==
Projek: High Council premiered on Astro GO starting on January 14, 2023, every Saturday, while on Astro Ria, the series premiered on January 23 every Monday. The series was also premiered on Netflix starting 11 March 2024.

== Controversies ==
Projek: High Council received criticism from Public Health Malaysia (PHM), a Malaysian public health advocacy think tank, from a tweet on Twitter who said there were too many depictions of smoking and overdramatization in the series. Apart from that, PHM said if there were any ‘mythic beings’ who asked the production crew to add the excessive amount of smoking scenes. Naim Daniel responded to the issue.

On April 4, 2023, a 22 year old university student was fined RM600 after pirating the series on his device. Astro said in a statement, a police report was made on February 14.

== Awards and nominations ==
Year	Award	Category	Recipient/Nominated work	Result
2023	35th Anugerah Bintang Popular Berita Harian	Popular New Male Artist	Amir Ahnaf	Won
2023	ContentAsia Awards	Silver - Best Supporting Actor	Naim Daniel	Won

== See also ==
- Juvana (2011), drama series by Primeworks Studios
- Kahar: Kapla High Council (2024), prequel film to Projek: High Council
- Kudrat 1968: High Council, prequel series and film to Projek: High Council
