= W – Two Worlds =

- Genre: Romantic, sci-fi, action
- Based on: W by Jung Dae-yoon
- Written by: Fairul Nizam Ablah; Mamu Vies; Bainun Waheeda; Baizura Kahar; Hadi M. Nor
- Directed by: Yusry Abdul Halim
- Starring: Daiyan Trisha; Hun Haqeem; Faizal Hussein; Elizabeth Tan; Mierul Aiman; Tony Eusoff; Shah Kimin
- Country of origin: Malaysia
- Original language: Malay
- No. of episodes: 12

Production
- Executive producers: Zurina Ramli; Kingsley Warner; Imillya Irwani Roslan; Steven Lim Tze Siang
- Cinematography: Irwan Munir
- Editor: Nik Johan
- Running time: 40 minutes
- Production company: Independent Pictures

Original release
- Network: Viu
- Release: 30 November 2023 – 4 January 2024

W – Two Worlds is a 2023 Malaysian television drama series directed by Yusry Abdul Halim, starring Daiyan Trisha, Hun Haqeem, Faizal Hussein and Elizabeth Tan. The series was based on the 2016 South Korean drama series, W and was first aired on Viu from 30 November 2023 to 4 January 2024.

== Premise ==
A romance takes place between Alif Hadi, who is super rich and exists in the webtoon "W," and Izara Omar, who is a doctor in the real world.

== Cast ==
=== Main ===
- Hun Haqeem as Aliff Hadi
- Daiyan Trisha as Izara
- Faizal Hussein as Omar Yusuf
- Mierul Aiman as Ghazi
- Elizabeth Tan as Hanna
- Tony Eusoff as Musa

=== Supporting ===
- Shah Kimin as Rafi
- Amerul Affendi as Shawn
- Azrul Zaidi as Dr. Zul
- Ahmad Idham as Alif's father
- Maria Farida as Aliff's mother
- Alyssa Dezek as Aliff's sister
- Juzzthin as the waiter

=== Cameos ===
- Hasnida Hanim Ahmad Kamil as the sports commentator #1
- Fariz Zolkarnain as the sports commentator #2

== Production ==
The series was based on W, a 2016 South Korean drama series directed Jung Dae-yoon, starring Lee Jong-suk and Han Hyo-joo. The series was announced as one of the five Viu Originals for 2023 in a press conference held on 1 December 2022. It was directed by Yusry Abdul Halim, who previously directed Ganjil and a Malaysian version of She Was Pretty, both aired on Viu.
