= War on Terror: KL Anarchy =

- Theatrical release poster
- Directed by: Kroll Azry; Frank See
- Screenplay by: Kroll Azry; Nazri Vovinski; Frank See
- Story by: Frank See; Nazri Vovinski; Kroll Azry
- Produced by: Chee Ang Keoh; Datuk Steven Lim
- Starring: Aedy Ashraf; Farali Khan; Adlin Aman Ramlee; Daiyan Trisha; Qi Razali; Naque Ariffin
- Cinematography: Madnor Kassim
- Edited by: Johan Arif Mahzan
- Music by: Stanley Fam
- Production companies: Royal Malaysian Police; Multimedia Entertainment; Golden Screen Cinemas; Astro; SixFun Media
- Distributed by: GSC Movies; Astro Shaw; Golden Village Pictures
- Release date: 23 November 2023 (Malaysia)
- Running time: 100 minutes
- Country: Malaysia
- Language: Malay
- Box office: RM4.14 million

War On Terror: KL Anarchy (Note: For Malay language title, the word 'Anarchy' was changed to Anarki) is a 2023 Malaysian Malay-language action thriller film directed by Kroll Azry and Frank See from a story by Frank, Kroll and Nazri Vovinski who also written the screenplay. The film stars Aedy Ashraf, Farali Khan, Adlin Aman Ramlee, Daiyan Trisha, Qi Razali, Naque Ariffin and other cast members. The film was released in Malaysia on 23 November 2023.

== Synopsis ==
Khalid (Aedy Ashraf), a rebellious cop from an elite special force must prove he is able to work as a team in order to thwart terrorist threats to bring down Kuala Lumpur.

== Cast ==
Anti-terrorism / E8 Unit

- Aedy Ashraf as Khalid: A reckless person who often takes action based on his instinct
- Farali Khan as Anis: Team leader of a Special Force team and the only female in the team
- Adlin Aman Ramlee as Mr. Rahman: Team leader of a Special Force team within anti-terrorism sector
- Noki K-Clique as Zack: A happy-go-luck person
- Kahoe Hon as Bob: A hacker
- Sasidaran as Deva / EOD

Terrorists

- Qi Razali as Lang Anurak: Mastermind behind a terrorism group, stepbrother to Joe and son of Anurak
- Naque Ariffin as Joe Anurak: A rebellious person who is also cruel and inhumane person. Joe is also stepbrother to Lang and son of Anurak
- Samarinna Tolhip as Rita: Joe and Lang's adopted sister
- Wan Hanafi Su as Anurak: Father of Joe and Lang

Civilians / Others

- Daiyan Trisha as Maria: Khalid's ex-wife
- Laura Olivia as Dee: Khalid's daughter
- Daniel Gan as Mike
- Bidin Al-Zaifa as Sufian
- Azri Iskandar as Datuk Razlan
- Keoh Chee Ang as Adam
- Commissioner Dato Hazani Ghazali, Director Internal Security and Public Order Department Bukit Aman as himself

== Production ==
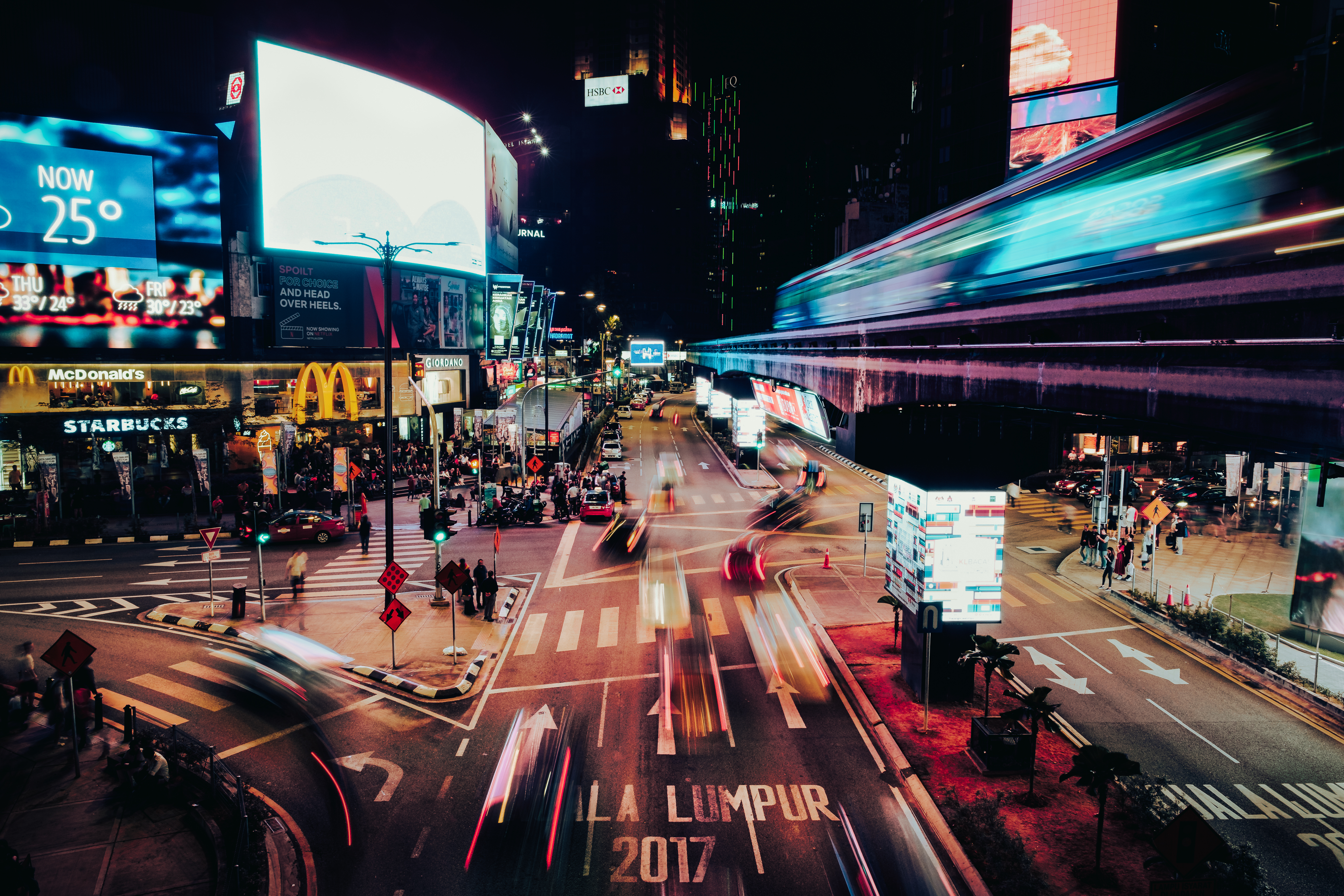
Bukit Bintang as on 2019 where the surround place being the set of the shooting

The film was co-produced by Royal Malaysia Police and Multimedia Entertainment in association with Golden Screen Cinemas, Astro and SixFun Media with Honor X9b 5G as the film's official smartphone.

The film was co-directed by Kroll Azry who previously directed music video of "Apa Khabar" by Joe Flizzow ft. SonaOne and Frank See who previously directed Air Force The Movie: Selagi Bernyawa who also become military advisor and writer of PASKAL: The Movie.

=== Internet sensation ===
This film once become a sensation in Internet after a video uploaded by the user @rayzkiee on TikTok when citizen though it was a big accident that occurred on Bukit Bintang. It was later discovered by Twitter user Azizul Farhan that based on the position of the car, it was a set of this film. That set can be seen on teaser and official poster.

After 48 hours of the chaos, GSC Movies announced the film on their social media while showing the teaser poster.

=== Filming ===
According to citizen who was around the set in Bukit Bintang, the shooting take place for a week around 10 p.m. to 5 a.m. while directors have the obey the Standard Operation Procedure (SOP) for closing the road. The shooting were also taking place around a low-cost flat and a mock-up lift was built in Iskandar Malaysia Studios in Johor. They also shoot around the train railroad while the train is moving and some stunts were made by the actors themselves.

=== Casting ===
For Qi Razali, he is glad to play a villain role in this film. He told New Straits Times,

"I've never played the antagonist in a feature film before. So, I was excited to play this baddie named Lang.

"It's also been my dream to be a part of a production that tells the heroic story of uniformed bodies,"

In the same article,

"I found playing an antagonist interesting as it gave me more freedom and flexibility to develop the character.

"Especially in a movie like this, where some of us had the chance to do our own stunts and handle firearms,"
