= Dunia Generasi Baru =

- Genre: Drama
- Written by: Wan Hasliza Wan Zainuddin
- Directed by: Johan Bahar
- Starring: Kaka Azraff; Natasha Elyzza; Erwin Dawson; Fadlan Hazim; Zahirah MacWilson; Ben Amir; Mathilda Malis
- Opening theme: "Bukan Hal Aku" by Kaka Azraff feat Sleeq
- Ending theme: "Bawa Aku Pergi" by Kaka Azraff feat Zizan Razak
- Country of origin: Malaysia
- Original language: Malay
- No. of seasons: 1
- No. of episodes: 13

Original release
- Network: TV9
- Release: 16 April – 9 July 2015

Dunia Generasi Baru (English: The World of New Generation) is a 2015 Malaysian youth-oriented television drama series directed by Johan Bahar with a script by Wan Hasliza Wan Zainuddin, inspired by the TV series, Dunia Baru. It aired from 16 April 2015 to 9 July 2015 on Slot Aurora TV9.

== Synopsis ==
The story of six teenagers Norelle, Zuhal, Zahra, Rik, Siska and Aman who have various personalities and quirks. Everything is united and embroidered with the value of friendship that is sure to entertain the audience. Norelle (Kaka Azraff) is a lively and childish girl who is easy to get along with and is often a good listener and advisor.

Because of that, sometimes Norelle has to spend a lot of her time solving the problems of the people around her. Aman (Erwin Dawson) always tries to act 'cool' even though his actions always make others misunderstand. A funny person who likes to have his conversations in a 'rap' way. Aman shares a room with Zuhal (Ben Amir), a handsome man who is spoiled by the luxury of his family. Although Zuhal is easily angered, the two are close friends. Rik (Fadlan Hazim) also has his own story and is somewhat mysterious.

Zahra (Zahirah Macwilson), a sweet girl from a simple family. She was initially hostile to Norelle, but then they became good friends. So was Siska (Natasha Elyzza), the daughter of a rock star who tried to escape the spotlight and refused to use her father as an advantage. Full of challenges, these six teenagers had to face their own problems in going to university and maintaining their friendship. However, there was no easy way out because more and more conflicts befell them.

Behind the diverse attitudes of her female friends, Norelle also faced male friends who also had their own problems. They consisted of Aman who was cunning and liked to deceive his parents. Zuhal, the son of a wealthy man who was egotistical and lived on money. Meanwhile, Rik was a casanova who liked to play with love. Meanwhile, Zuhal had made a bet with Rik to seduce Zahra. If Rik succeeded in making Zahra fall in love, Rik would be able to own his Vespa.

== Cast ==
=== Main role ===
- Kaka Azraff as Norelle (pronounced Norell)
- Natasha Elyzza as Siska
- Erwin Dawson as Aman
- Fadlan Hazim as Rik
- Zahirah MacWilson as Zahrah
- Ben Amir as Zuhal
- Mathilda Malis as Marina

=== Supporting role ===
- Azhar Sulaiman as Rio (Siska's father)
- Haeriyanto Hassan as Zahari (Zuhal's father)
- Hafiz Halim as Abang Boy (Siska's brother)
- Amai Kamarudin as MAHA (Senior student)
- Laila Nasir as Zulaika (Zahra's mother)
- Aedy Ashraf as Andy (Episodes 12,13)
- Afry Wijoyo as (Additional cast)
- Anumahsuri as Lani (Siska's classmate)

== Episode list ==
	Synopsis
1.	Each of them started registering for college and met their future friends who would become their friends for the next 3-4 years. Some of them started to start independent lives away from their families. Zahari, Zuhal's father was shocked when he met his ex-wife Zulaikha during student registration.
2.	The students were divided into their respective groups, some got mentors who were real estate agents, some were MLM coffee sellers by the seniors of the orientation group Norelle, Rik, Aman and Marina, namely Fikri. They became downlines after being offered a RM50 entry form but made a profit of RM800. Another thing, the Tajul Coffee used is the same name as the Tajul character in Dunia Baru (TV series) an entrepreneur and opportunist. Siska and Zahra also smelled Maha's bad intentions who exploited the freshies by often taking pictures and uploading them to Instagram.
3.	After registering for the class module, the students started to worry because they needed a lot of money to buy reference books, especially Norelle. The name Zuhal became a joke in college because it was the name of the planet Jupiter. Rik started to attract any college girl, both senior and freshie. But he didn't seem to want to make a serious commitment to Marina. Norelle and Zahra were accepted to work part-time for 4 hours a day at Kafe Opie, the name of this cafe was taken in conjunction with the character Opie in Dunia Baru (TV series) played by Elyana Emrizal.
4.	Zuhal and Rik, who are starting to fall in love because they are each crazy about women, feel bad about Aman's constant demands for perfection and trivialities such as not liking to drive fast, reminding them of the importance of wearing seat belts, not liking them making noise in the room. So they conspire to seduce Aman and Norelle. Rik tries to seduce Zahra but fails because she is not easily tamed. The vicious war between Rik, Zuhal vs Aman is getting worse. Siska is getting more and more depressed by her father's childish behavior.
5.	Siska tries her best to keep her family background a secret by making up stories that she is poor, her father works as a can picker and a garbage dump worker. and comes from a village. So that her friends don't know that she is the daughter of a popular musician. The effects of her actions will trouble her later on. Norelle & Zahra begin to suspect because Siska often gives unreasonable excuses. Zuhal is foul-mouthed and accuses Zahra of being dirty, causing her to get angry with Rik and become the cause of their enmity. Aman tries to hone her musical talent despite being severely criticized online.
6.	To befriend Zahra, Rik has created a fake Aaron Musa profile on Facebook so that he can approach Zahra secretly. Aman who is now known as King Aman, a viral rapper on BlahTube, has become a joke on campus. Aman began to be good friends with Rik on how to be a macho, masculine man. Siska is also stressed working under Mrs. Mahani because she spends more time dealing with her daughter, Kobi's problems than doing her studies.
7.	Zuhal, who has a girlfriend named Seri, studies abroad and is often in touch from late at night until early in the morning, disturbing her sleep until she falls asleep in class. Norelle, who is short of money, steals Siska's money to settle her debt to the cafe boss Opie. Siska, without even asking, suspects Lani of stealing her money. So much so that one campus thinks badly of Lani.
8.	Norelle and Lani are excited when the Horizon group is going to hold a reunion concert in KL. Norelle and Zahra are gossiping about Lani's behavior who often hangs out in their room. Aman also meets with counselor Miss Hani because of his low self-esteem and lack of self-confidence. Zahari, Zuhal's father begins to suspect that Zahra is his son with his wife from his first marriage. Then he meets with Zulaikha, Zahra's mother to unravel all the questions (this is similar to the story of Opie and Suzanna in the original series where they became half-siblings because Opie's mother married Suzanna's father) After investigating Siska, Norelle is surprised that Rio from the Horizon group is her father.
9.	Zahra feels inferior because Zuhal gets high marks in the quiz. Norelle keeps asking Siska questions about Rio, causing her to become restless and angry. Rik begins to build a good relationship with Zahra when he helps get Zuhal's answer sheets for her.
10.	Zahra starts pressuring Aaron Musa (pseudonym Rik) to meet face to face. Rik hires Zack to meet Zahra and disguises himself as Aaron Musa. Aman starts obsessing over Siska after getting excited when Norelle tells him her secret. Zuhal starts suspecting that something is wrong between his father and Zahra's mother. Rik rebels, not wanting to accept his father in his life because of his father's abuse and irresponsibility. Now his father is in a coma and his brain is no longer functioning.
11.	Zuhal was shocked when he heard his father's confession, it turned out that he and Zahra were siblings with the same father but different biological mothers. Zahra was like a sister to him, only 2 months apart in age but born in the same year. This made him confused and behave strangely. Norelle was discouraged by Aman for ignoring her after getting an offer from a music producer.
12.	Rik decides to kill off Aaron Musa's character, disappointing Zahra. Zuhal wants to end his vespa bet with Rik and Rik is now free to continue a serious relationship with Zahra. Aman seeks advice from his friends about a recording contract.
13.	The appearance of Andy, who loves to write poetry, makes Zahra start to recover from the loss of Aaron Musa. Rik's action of killing Aaron's character ends up costing him because Andy is now his rival. Siska's secret is revealed and she is angry with Norelle and Aman. Norelle is burdened by her family's debts and chooses whether to stop studying or work. Zuhal finally tells Zahra that they are siblings and they have the same father's name. They go to persuade Norelle not to stop.

== Soundtrack ==
1. Kaka Azraff feat. Sleeq - Bukan Hal Aku (Opening Theme)
2. Kaka Azraff feat Zizan Razak - Bawa Aku Pergi (End Theme)

== Trivia ==
- The character Zuhal, played by Ben Amir, actually has the same name as the character Uncle Zuhal, played by Usop Wilcha in Dunia Baru Season One.
- The location where they continued their studies was at IUMW (International University of Malaysia Wales). A private university that has a collaboration with the University of Malaya and its campus is located on Jalan Tun Ismail in the middle of the city. Close to public transport access such as KTM - Putra Station and STAR Sultan Ismail LRT Station and PWTC. Also neighboring OUM (Open University Malaysia).
- Family ties - Zahra and Zuhal can be considered half sibling/half brother/half sister because they come from the same father and different mothers. Zuhal's father, Zahari divorced Zahra's mother while she was pregnant with Zahra and he did not know she was pregnant when he divorced her. Then he married Zuhal's mother. Zahra's mother only said that her father had died before she was born. Zahra has 2 more siblings from her mother's second marriage.
- Suzanna in the original series Dunia Baru is seen cheating on her status by saying she comes from a rich family, in fact she comes from a poor family. This is in contrast to Siska who comes from a wealthy family but lies to her friends and campus residents that she comes from a poor family.
- Almost every episode Rik will have a new partner, this Rik is similar to Umarah played by Que Haidar in the original series. But Rik is not stingy and thinks about money.
- The place where Rik always dates is at Uncle Ron's Cafe, Kota Damansara.
- Zack (episode 10) who was hired by Rik to impersonate Aaron Musa is the same person who plays the role of Kodok in the TV series KAMI.
- Nomi, Norelle's younger sister only communicates with Norelle via phone but her character is never shown.
- Kaka Azraff and Ben Zahid are back to acting together in the drama Inai Yang Hilang (2018) NTV7.
