= Soloz =

Malaysian streamer, video game player and vlogger (born 1993)

Soloz PJK (Negeri Sembilan)
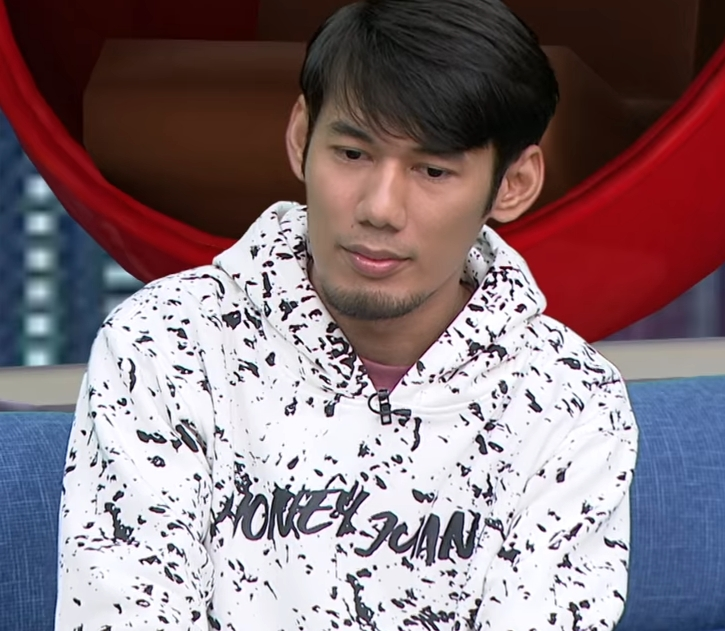
- Soloz in 2020
- Born: Muhammad Faris bin Zakaria; May 9, 1993 (age 33); Seremban, Negeri Sembilan, Malaysia
- Other names: Soloz, The King Without a Crown (Raja tanpa Mahkota)
- Occupation: Streamer
- Years active: 2016–present
- Known for: Mobile Legends: Bang Bang player
- Spouse: Maryam Jamilah Rahim (m. 2020)

Muhammad Faris Zakaria (born 9 May 1993), also known as Soloz, is a Malaysian streamer, vlogger, and professional Mobile Legends: Bang Bang and Honor of Kings player. Some Esports players call him "The King Without a Crown".

== Career ==
=== 2016–2019: Mobile Legends at the 2019 SEA Games ===
Soloz began with the Mysterious Assassin (MyA) team alongside Zyzz, Sh4dow and 2ez4jepv. The team won the Mobile Legends Professional League 2018 (MPL 2018) Battleground tournament and placed second in the MVP Cup.

In 2018, Soloz joined AirAsia Saiyan. In this team, Soloz won the Gegaria Fest Putrajaya, facing off against MyA and bringing home RM5,000. In October, Rush, Penjahat, HawkEye, Gripex, Logan, and Soloz as captain, joined Team Bosskurr.

Under the Team Bosskurr, Soloz won the Todak Fest. In a best-of-one match, the club won RM50,000 by defeating MyA. As a result, Soloz was chosen to represent Malaysia in the 2019 SEA Games as their MLBB eSports athlete, in which he placed third after losing to the Filipino team in the semi-finals.

== 2022–2024: Awards and team founding ==
In January 2022, Soloz was awarded the Pingat Jasa Kebaktian (P.J.K.) in conjunction with the 74th birthday of the Yang di-Pertuan Besar of Negeri Sembilan for his contribution to Malaysian esports.

In July 2024, Soloz bought the team slot King Empire in the MPL MY, with the help of Muhammad "KingShah" Shafiq and Amirul Mukmimin "KingYonnyz" Zahri. Soloz renamed the team to "Team Vamos". He won Best Streamer at the MLBB Awards in 2024.

=== 2025–present: Film making and new projects ===
On March 26, 2024, Moonton announced a new project called Soloz: Game of Life. The film recounts Soloz's life and stars Hun Haqeem, Ikmal Amry, and Jaa Suzuran.

== Personal life ==
Soloz is a native of Negeri Sembilan. In June 2020, he announced his marriage to Maryam Jamilah Rahim.

== Awards ==
- Negeri Sembilan
  - Pingat Jasa Kebaktian (P.J.K.) (2022)
- Malaysia Book of Records
  - Most followers on Facebook (eSports category) (2020)
- MLBB Awards
  - Best Streamer (2024)
