= Amir Ahnaf =

Malaysian actor and model

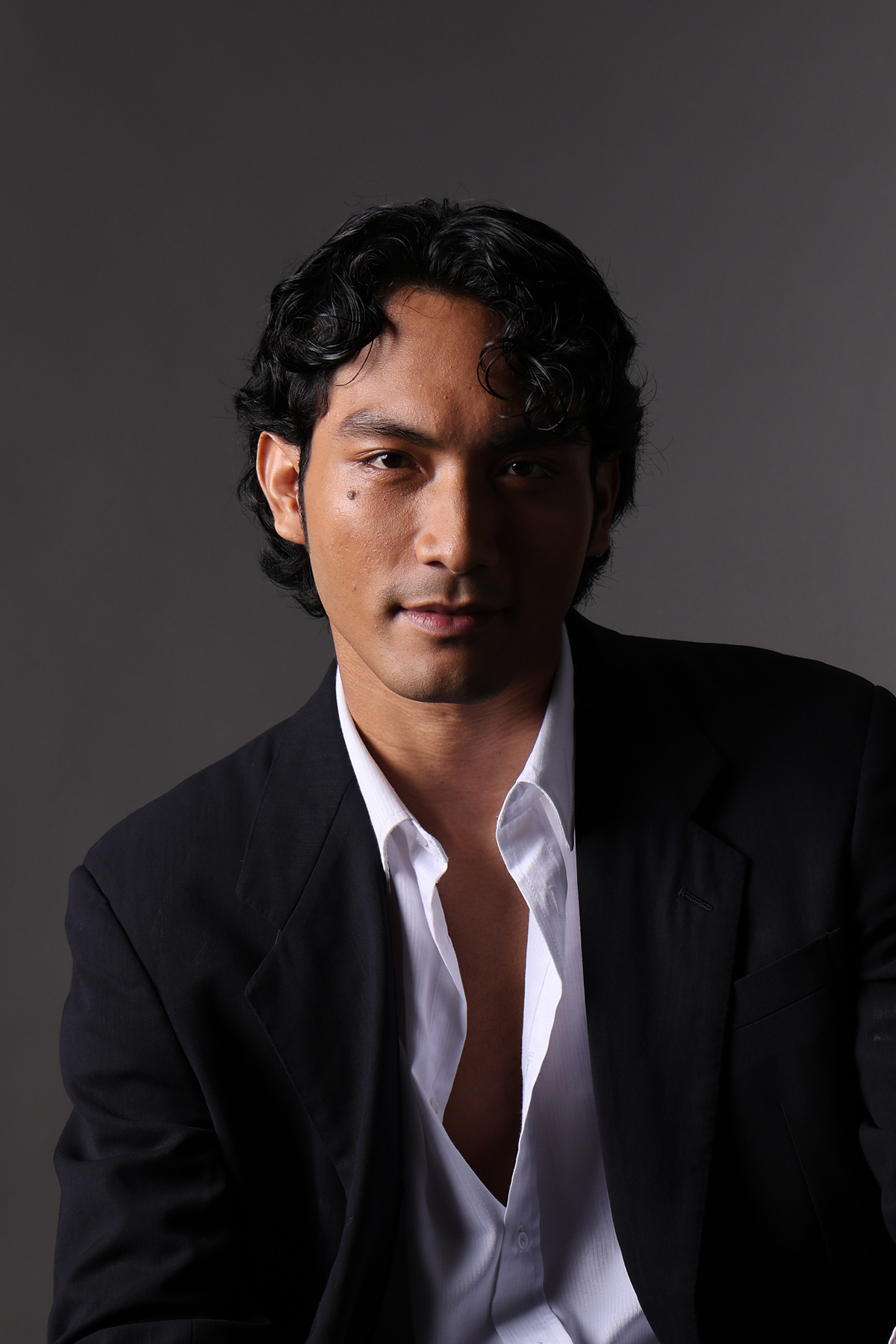
- Ahnaf in 2026
- Born: Muhammad Amir Ahnaf bin Mohd Khairudin; February 17, 2000 (age 26); Dungun, Terengganu, Malaysia
- Education: Maktab Rendah Sains MARA (MRSM) Kuala Terengganu; Universiti Pendidikan Sultan Idris
- Occupations: Actor; Model
- Years active: 2021–present
- Employer: Rocketfuel Entertainment
- Known for: Kahar in Projek: High Council and Kahar Kapla: High Council

Muhammad Amir Ahnaf bin Mohd Khairudin (born 17 February 2000), also known as Amir Ahnaf, is a Malaysian actor and model. Amir's acting career started as one of the contestants in Hero Remaja (2021/2022). He later played in Mat Kilau sequel, Pendekar Awang: Darah Indera Gajah in 2024. Amir also appears in Terkutuk, an Indonesian film in the same year.

== Career ==
His career began after he was selected as one of the contestants in Hero Remaja 2021.

He began his career as an actor by starring in the drama series 'Akim & Mira - Kisah Cinta 1999' and playing the role of Ejoi which began airing on Astro Ria starting December 22, 2022. He gained widespread attention by playing the role of Kahar, a student at Kolej Ungku Deramat (KUDRAT) in Projek: High Council which was aired simultaneously on Astro GO and Astro Ria. It also stars Mierul Aiman, Nadhir Nasar, Naim Daniel and Daiyan Trisha.

In 2026, he starred in the action film Tarung: Unforgiven produced by Alpha47 Films, playing the role of Yusof Zarul and also working with Mierul Aiman in the film.

He won Best Promising Actor at the 34th Malaysia Film Festival.

== Personal life ==
Amir Ahnaf was born in Dungun, Terengganu.

Amir received his secondary education at Maktab Rendah Sains MARA (MRSM) Kuala Terengganu. He later pursued his higher education at Universiti Pendidikan Sultan Idris (UPSI) , where he graduated with a Diploma in Game Design and Development.

== Filmography ==
=== Films ===
Year	Title	Role	Note
2023	Harta Berdaulat	Ameer Yousof	Short film
2024	Pendekar Awang: Darah Indera Gajah	Andak	Feature debut
2024	Terkutuk	Joko	Indonesian horror film
2024	Kahar: Kapla High Council	Kahar	Prequel of Projek:_High_Council
2026	Kerikil Depan Pintu	Adam	Telemovie
2026	Baga	Jani	Pre-production
2026	Sayang		Pre-production
2026	Tarung: Unforgiven	Yusof Zarul	Movie

=== Television ===
==== Dramas ====
Year	Title	Role	Network	Note
2022	Rindu Darul Iman	Ijad	TV Okey	
2022–2023	Akim & Mira – Kisah Cinta 1999	Ejoi	Astro Ria	
2022–2023	Kisah Cinta Phoebe Dan Ejoi	Ejoi	Astro Gempak	
2023	Projek: High Council	Kahar	Astro Ria	
2023	Scammer Geng Marhaban	Aidil	Astro Ria	
2023	Sakit Tengkuk Betul Lah	Latif	TV Okey	
2023–2024	Gamers Mangkuk	Tam	Astro Premier	
2023–2024	Syurga Itu Bukan Mudah	Farid	Astro Ria	
2025	Keluarga Itu	Aman	TV3	
2026	Cinta Dalam Sekam	Imran Shahrizal	Viu	

=== Web series ===
Year	Series	Role	Network	Note
2023	Perempuan Itu	Remy	Tonton	
