= Waktu Rehat =

- Title card
- Also known as: As the Bell Rings Malaysia
- Genre: Comedy
- Starring: Nik Adruce; Juzzthin; Tengku Iezahdiyana Nurhanie Tengku Alaudin; Farhanna Qismina; Aedy Ashraf; Nurul Elfira Loy; Sharon Alaina Stephen; Cindy Alisha; Amirul Hakim; Nasiruddin Nasir; Nicholas Cheng; Ashmen Iskandar Weiss; Syuhaida Abraz
- Opening theme: "Waktu Rehat"
- Country of origin: Malaysia
- Original languages: Malay; English
- No. of seasons: 3
- No. of episodes: 52 (list of episodes)

Production
- Executive producer: Jennifier S. Ng
- Producers: Lina Tan; Mona Tan (Producer); Mary Aw; Jefferey Yong
- Editor: John Hafiz
- Camera setup: Single-camera
- Running time: 7 minutes
- Production companies: Red Communications Sdn. Bhd; Disney Channel Original Productions

Original release
- Network: Disney Channel Asia; Disney XD Asia
- Release: 31 August 2010 – 30 September 2012

Related
- As the Bell Rings

Waktu Rehat (English: Break Time), also known as As the Bell Rings Malaysia, is a Disney Channel Asia original television series based on the Disney Channel Italy series Quelli dell'intervallo. The series follows a group of Malaysian lower secondary school students at the fictional S.M. Jalan Mas (Golden Road Secondary School) in the school hallway during recess.

The series premiered on 31 August 2010, and ran for three seasons until 30 September 2012. The first episode, titled "Durian Breath" or "Nafas Durian", was shown online on 18 August 2010 on Disney Channel Asia's website and YouTube channel. The series aired every Saturday and Sunday at 11:50 MST, with English subtitles added in each episode. All three seasons of the series were released to Disney+ Hotstar in 2021.

== Cast and characters ==
The cast of Season 1.

=== Main ===
- Nik Adruce as Johan Hamzah, the school sports captain, the captain of the red sport house and the football team. He loves to help friends and look for mischief together with his best friends Faiz and Syed. He is also Julie's older brother. He always wears a jacket (indicating that he is the school sports captain). He also loves animals, but suffers from severe blattodephobia, a fear of cockroaches. He transfers to a sports school in Season 2.
- Juzzthin as Syed, a 15-year-old prankster who has a huge crush on Amirah. He is Johan and Faiz's best friend. He is also a rapper.
- Tengku Iezahdiyana Nurhanie Tengku Alaudin as Luna, nicknamed "the earnest problem solver". Her motto is "don't crumble when there's trouble". She is smart and resourceful, and is always eager to help people. Her best friend is Amirah, and is the love interest of Anding, who desperately tries to win her heart. Iezahdiyana also played Lina, Luna's mischievous cousin, in the episode "Nice Luna, Naughty Luna".
- Farhanna Qismina as Julie Hamzah, a librarian, a member of the student council, and a straight-A student. She is a nerd who likes to read (especially teen fiction and romance) and always dreams about a prince that looks like Nick Jonas. She is Johan's younger sister. She is very helpful, and is always in her school librarian uniform.
- Aedy Ashraf as Faiz, reputed as "the person who can get whatever you want". His best friends are Syed and Johan. His catchphrase is, "time to disappear" whenever he wants to sneak away from trouble and escape from Wai Chong's influence. He wears a red jacket most of the time. In Season 2, Faiz had a crush on a student from SM Bukit Gangsa named G, who is reputed to be more cunning than him.
- Nurul Elfira Loy as Amirah Aminuddin, the most popular girl in school. Her best friend is Luna. She has a legion of fans in the school and receives an average of 20 fan mail messages daily. She is the love interest of Syed, who desperately tries to win her heart. In Season 2, she is the head cheerleader of SM Jalan Mas.
- Sharon Alaina Stephen as Kieran, a tomboyish girl who does taekwondo. She does not like girly clothes, preferring to wear tracksuits or a taekwondo uniform instead. She is also always seen wearing a headband. She is Mindy's best friend. She is usually paired with Johan on sporting activities. She became the new sports captain in season 2, replacing Johan. She is the first girl to acquire the position in S.M. Jalan Mas.
- Cindy Alisha as Mindy, the chief writer for the school newspaper. She is usually seen with glasses and two pony tails. She has a camera and recorder with her at all times. She is Kieran's best friend. She left the school in Season 2.
- Amirul Hakim as Anding, the president of the astronomy club. He is usually seen wearing glasses and a sweater. He is the smartest in his grade, but is easily pranked by Syed. He has a major crush on Luna and his best friend is Wai Chong.
- Nasiruddin Nasir as Suresh, a Malaysian-Indian student who loves food except roti canai and can recognise any type of food in one bite. He is the only male student in home economics class. He also loves cooking as much as he loves food.
- Nicholas Cheng as Wai Chong, the head prefect at S.M. Jalan Mas, and a member of the student council. He wears glasses and a jacket. He is one of the best recognizable students for perfect attendance, and is the president of the "Anti-dating" club. His catchphrase is "Don't run!" when someone tries to run away after he caught them disobeying the school rules.
- Ashmen Iskandar Weiss as Adam, a musically inclined student who enjoys playing his guitar. He transferred to S.M. Jalan Mas in Season 2. He is blessed with good looks and a charming personality, but he feels rather insecure about himself.
- Syuhaida Abraz as Rosie, a new student at S.M. Jalan Mas. She is a bubbly girl who wants to be the country's first female astronaut.

=== Minor characters ===
- The Principal - He is the principal of S.M. Jalan Mas. He is never seen in the show nor the opening sequence, but his voice is sometimes heard. His head prefect, Wai Chong helps him give detentions to the students who break the rules.
- Ahmad Ezzrin Loy as Nik - He is usually seen in the corridor during the show, and it is revealed at the end of the episode "Brotherly Love" that he is Julie's boyfriend.
- Alam - A great shuffler who teaches Anding shuffling moves in return for Anding's help in his school science project in the episode "The Shuffle Champion". His tagline is "word" whenever he wanted to express his opinion.
- Pak Syukor - A ghostly spirit which believed to be the school guardian by some of the students. It is believed that he knows every answer for everything in the episode "Haunted Help".
- Atan bin Awang - A new student at S.M. Jalan Mas in the episode "The Bully", who had been possibly transferred to the school due to his previous bad record. He had harassed most of the characters by beating some of them and writing slurs on their backs. He has a small squeaky tone of voice despite his sheer size.
- Atan's Mom - She was called to the principal's office due to her son's behaviour, and is possibly among the few people that Atan is afraid of.
- Juliana Evans as Azza - A possible new student at S.M. Jalan Mas, reportedly a part-model from London and a cousin of the real Juliana Evans.
- Dafi as Azahari - A handsome new student at S.M. Jalan Mas, which Amirah, Luna, and Mindy were excited upon seeing him by the end of the episode "Gossip".
- Sara Ali as G - A student from SM Bukit Gangsa, who is reputed to be more cunning than the mischievous Faiz. She is Faiz's first love interest until Season 3, where it is revealed that G is in love with another guy. However, despite that, she is still happy.
- Azlan Iskandar as himself - A champion of squash who helps SMK Jalan Mas win the tennis competition.
- Nazrudin Rahman as himself - The Host of Pelajar Ikon.
- Adibah Noor as herself - She is Rosie's aunt who helps Faiz in forgetting his bad problems. She also usually forgets her own problems by singing. She appeared in the episode "Faiz Gets His Groove Back".
- Azurah Aminuddin - Amirah's sister, who appears in the episode "The Magical Watch".

== Settings ==
- Sekolah Menengah Jalan Mas (Golden Road Secondary School), or S.M. Jalan Mas - The secondary school where all of the characters attend.
- S.M. Jalan Mas school corridor - Adopting most of the As the Bell Rings series, the show revolves mainly around the school main corridor. It features the school motto "Bersatu Padu ke Arah Kejayaan" (Unity Towards Excellence) as the backdrop and a replica of the Petronas Towers in the middle of the corridor. The school's main corridor faces the school fish pond and the Principal's office.

== Theme song and opening sequence ==
The show theme song, "Waktu Rehat", is adopted and translated to Malay from the original Italian version (which is also used by most of the international versions of the series) and was performed by the cast themselves.

The opening title sequence of the series begins by the main characters introducing themselves, this was followed by a scenario where the characters are bored in a comical drawn classroom and waiting for the recess to arrive. As the school bell finally rings to mark the recess, the characters dances cheerfully. The sequence ends when the characters taking the class photo and the title logo is featured.

=== Lyrics ===
Malay original
English translation

Tak sabar kami menanti
Waktu rehat tiba lagi
Heboh, kecoh dan meriah
Bila dengan kawan sekolah

Jadi mari bersama kami
Disini
Lawak, gelak, rancak, borak
Semua di waktu rehat

We just can't wait any longer
Break time finally arrives
Excitement, sizzle and joy
When together with schoolmates

So come on and join us now
Together
Fun, laughter, lively, chatting
All during break time

== Mini episodes ==
=== Challenge ===
The Challenge is a game set by the characters, which serves as a mini-episode of the series.

1. "Shuffle challenge" by Faiz
2. "Durian eating challenge" by Kieran
3. "Thumb wrestling challenge" by Mindy
4. "Cake decorating challenge" by Anding
5. "Pantun challenge" by Luna
6. "Make-up challenge" by Amirah
7. "Rapping challenge" by Syed
8. "Impersonations challenge" by Wai Chong

=== The Mystery Files ===
The Mystery Files is a crime series set by characters to let viewers decide who was responsible for most of these incidents throughout the series.

1. "Where's Julie?": The spirit is guilty = Julie was missing
2. "The Missing Sodium": Luna is guilty = Anding lost his sodium
3. "Deadly Durian": Amirah is guilty = Kieran fainted after smelling some durian
4. "Zombie Prank": Adam is guilty = The toilet had a zombie
5. "Guitar String": Wai Chong is guilty = Adam's guitar string was broken
6. "Moustache": Julie is guilty = Kieran grew a moustache
7. "Apple Crumble": Amirah is guilty = Suresh's apple crumble became spicy
8. "Missing Sandwich": Syed is guilty = Wai Chong lost his sandwich

== Reception ==
Below are the seasonal rankings (based on average total viewers per episode) of Waktu Rehat on Disney Channel Asia.

| Season | Timeslot | Season premiere | Season finale | Viewers (in millions) |
|---|---|---|---|---|
| 1 | Saturday and Sunday at 12:00 MST | 31 August 2010 | 25 December 2010 | 2.08 |
| 2 | Saturday and Sunday at 12:00 MST | 12 March 2011 | 14 September 2011 | 5.09 |
| 3 | Saturday and Sunday at 11:45 MST | 10 March 2012 | 30 September 2012 | —N/a |

== Rule numbering ==
It is revealed in "Behind the Scenes of Waktu Rehat" by Nicholas Cheng that there are 54,321 rules enumerated in the rule book of S.M. Jalan Mas.

- 115B - No eating anywhere but the canteen.
- 12A Paragraph 5 - Do not set up a picnic spot without a permit.
- 17F - Don't wear too many hair accessories.
- 18C - Do not cause people to faint in the corridor.
- 2055F - Do not wet the school floors.
- 300A - Do not plot revenge on anybody.
- 3000A - No gossiping. (Amirah is a prefect at an episode about a solar eclipse).
- 302B - No bad breath.
- 303/303E - Don't lie to the king/emperor about reality. (Made up by Wai Chong in his dream)
- 3082A - Do not make fun of prefects.
- 382A Paragraph 5 - No tricking a prefect and no framing of any best friend.
- 342C - No illegal gatherings at school corridors.
- 5D - Don't throw rubbish into the fish pond.
- 532B - Don't put a plastic cockroach on a prefect's sandwich.
- 533B - Invite the prefect if you're having a party (Made up by Wai Chong during the 1st season finale party)
- 633C Paragraph 10 - No shuffling in the school building/corridor.
- 75F - You can't have a rubber snake without a special license.
- 200A - Don't forget to shuffle in the school corridor.
- 44 Paragraph 4 - Do not torture people in public walkways.
- 208 Sub-Section 3 - No jumping jack drills in the school corridors.
- 333A - Do not burp in the laboratory after eating durians.
- 444A - No conspiring in the toilets.
- 444B - Do not faint along the corridor.
- 555A - Do not eat fried chicken around the school's chicken coop.
- 666A Paragraph 10 - No devil worshipping anywhere.
