= Projek: Anchor SPM =

- Genre: Teen drama
- Created by: Anwari Ashraf
- Written by: Anwari Ashraf; Luqman Sheikh Ghazali; Ahmad Al Iqbal; Khor Tai Yieng; Danial Hakim; Amira Nasiruddin; Nadim Hisham
- Directed by: Razaisyam Rashid; Anwari Ashraf
- Starring: Daiyan Trisha; Aedy Ashraf; Nadhir Nasar; Shasha Abedul; Chubb-E
- Country of origin: Malaysia
- Original language: Malay
- No. of episodes: 8

Production
- Executive producer: Raja Jastina Raja Arshad
- Producers: Fatimah Ruzaimi; Luqman Sheikh Ghazali
- Production locations: Cameron Highlands, Pahang, Malaysia; Kuala Lumpur, Malaysia
- Cinematography: Zulkefi Zain
- Editors: Irwan Ahmad; Razaisyam Rashid
- Production companies: Astro Shaw; Alpha 47 Films

Original release
- Network: Astro Citra
- Release: 15 March – 3 May 2021

Projek: Anchor SPM is a 2021 Malaysian television drama series co-directed by Razaisyam Rashid and Anwari Ashraf. Starring Aedy Ashraf, Daiyan Trisha, Nadhir Nasar, Chubb-E and Shasha Abedul, it tells the story of the five high school teenagers who will be pursue for Sijil Pelajaran Malaysia (SPM) examinations. The series premiered as part of Astro Originals banner on Astro Citra from 15 March 2021 until 3 May 2021.

== Premise ==
Set in the year 2003, Aizat, Aaidaa, Hilmi, Jaja and Botol are the Form 5 students at the prestigious Sekolah Tengku Isa Anuar (STIA) boarding school in Cameron Highlands, Pahang. Aizat, the respected captain of the rugby team, along with Hilmi, the brilliant Head of Students and Head of Prefect, and their friend known only as Botol, are close friends and are always there for each other in good and bad times. Aaidaa, STIA's most academically excellent student who likes to be alone, struggles to help her half-sister, Jaja, who is less good at education, to prepare for the SPM exams.

== Cast ==
- Daiyan Trisha as Aaidaa
- Aedy Ashraf as Aizat
- Shasha Abedul as Jaja
- Nadhir Nasar as Hilmi
- Chubb-E as Botol
- Adlin Aman Ramlie as Tuan Awang
- Tony Eusoff as Zubir
- Daniella Sya as Tai Ying
- Susan Lankester as Puan Rokiah
- Fadhli Masoot sebagai Zaim
- Taufiq Izmir sebagai Cheng
- Aida Khalida as the mother
- Hasnul Rahmat as Khairuddin
- Danish Hazriq as Aqil

== Episodes ==
No.	Title	Original release date
1	"Selamat Pulang Ke STIA"	15 March 2021
2	"O Captain, My Captain"	22 March 2021
3	"Hantu Locker"	29 March 2021
4	"Ohana 9903"	5 April 2021
5	"Beban Dunia"	12 April 2021
6	"Malam Sekapur Sireh"	19 April 2021
7	"Sijil Pelajaran Malaysia"	26 April 2021
8	"Sentiasa"	3 May 2021
