= Metro Crime Series: Siapa Lelaki Itu? =

- Genre: Crime; mystery
- Written by: Hadi M. Nor; Haris M. Nor; Lepat Hafiz
- Directed by: Faizul A. Rashid; Megat Sharizal
- Starring: Zahirah MacWilson; Aloy Paradoks; Mustaqim Bahadon; Chew Kin Wah; Nia Atasha; Aqilah Abas; Wan Raja
- Country of origin: Malaysia
- Original language: Malay
- No. of seasons: 1
- No. of episodes: 10

Production
- Executive producers: A Latiff Mohaideen; Razif Kasmar
- Producer: Dato' Saniboey Mohd Ismail
- Production company: Razor's Edge Pictures

Original release
- Network: Tonton; Netflix
- Release: 6 July – 3 August 2023

Metro Crime Series: Siapa Lelaki Itu? (English: Metro Crime Series: Who's That Man?) meet viewers on 6 July 2023, with 2 episodes aired every week exclusively on the online streaming platform www.tonton.com.my or the Tonton app.

This 10-episode drama series with a storyline inspired by high-profile criminal cases in Malaysia is a production of Razors Edge Pictures, directed by Megat Sharizal and Faizul A. Rashid with a script co-written by Hadi M. Nor, Haris M. Nor and Lepat Hafiz.

This series will also be rebroadcast on TV3 under the Lestary slot from 15 June to 6 July 2024 to replace the drama series Hello Jodoh and be replaced by the drama series Pengantin Pasti Jadi.

== Synopsis ==
The series revolves around the brutal death of Syerinie. Fatema (played by Zahirah Macwilson), a journalist for Harian Metro, is determined to cover a case that has shaken the country. However, her request is not approved by her editor. Instead, the coverage is assigned to her colleague, Rozimi (played by Aloy Paradoks).

Fatema is a hot-tempered person, so it's no wonder she decided to disobey orders and work with Rozimi.

Interviews with witnesses to the incident have led to the discovery of details that were obscured by the police. According to the witness, he saw a man who may have been Syerinie's killer.

Only Fatema and Rozimi reported the sighting of this mysterious man. This gave Harian Metro an advantage.

The next day, the main suspect was arrested. However, the man was not the man seen by the witnesses to the incident. So, the question that needs to be solved through the 10 episodes of this series is: 'Siapa Lelaki Itu?'

== Cast ==
=== Main role ===
- Zahirah MacWilson as Fatema Umar
- Aloy Paradox as Rozimi Razak
- Nia Atasha as Hazi
- Aqilah Abas as Yasmin
- Wan Raja as Zabidi

=== Supporting role ===
- Mustaqim Bahadon as DSP Marzuki
- Chew Kin Wah as Teon Chai
- Eamie Elyana as Syerinie
- Amanda Tan as Liza
- Chai Zi as Eric
- Zarynn Min as Saleha
- Azri Iskandar as Zafran
- Yusry Abdul Halim as Special Appearance
- Megat Adli as Imadi Wazir
- Azhar Sulaiman as Riyad Kamaruddin
- Aleza Shadan as Diyana
- Megat Sharizal as Isaac
- Aida Amirah as Syerina
- Afry Wijoyo as News Editor
- Meema Teh as News Editor
- Ande Umar as Inspector Aman
- Abi Madyan as Roslan

== Episode list ==
No.	Title	Release date on Tonton	Broadcast date on TV3
1	Lelaki Misteri (English: Mystery Man)	July 6, 2023	June 15, 2024
2	Dua Alam (English: Two Worlds)	July 6, 2023	June 20, 2024
3	Lelaki Kedua (English: Second Man)	July 13, 2023	June 21, 2024
4	Sugar	July 13, 2023	June 22, 2024
5	Hilang (Bahagian 1) (English: Lost (Part 1))	July 20, 2023	June 27, 2024
6	Gantung (English: Hang)	July 20, 2023	June 28, 2024
7	Klien (English: Client)	July 27, 2023	June 29, 2024
8	Renegade	July 27, 2023	July 4, 2024
9	Tikam (English: Stab)	August 3, 2023	July 5, 2024
10	Hilang (Bahagian 2) (English: Lost) (Part 2))	August 3, 2023	July 6, 2024

== Soundtrack ==
No.	Title	Artist	Time
1.	"Ilusi"	Marsha Milan feat. Hazama	03:50
2.	"Bongkar Saja"	Fai Ramli	3:15

TV3 : Lestary Slot , Thursday–Saturday, 9:00 pm
Previous	Metro Crime Series	Next
Hello Jodoh	Metro Crime Series	Pengantin Pasti Jadi
