= Nik Adruce =

Malaysian TV host and actor (born 1994)

- Born: Nik Muhammad Farith Adruce bin Nik Adelin; 30 September 1994 (age 30); Kuala Lumpur, Malaysia
- Occupation: Actor
- Years active: 2006–2011
- Spouse: Syafiqah Sofian (m. 2019)
- Children: 1

Nik Muhammad Farith Adruce bin Nik Adelin, professionally known as Nik Adruce (born 30 September 1994 in Bangsar, Kuala Lumpur, Malaysia) is a Malaysian TV host and actor.

== Personal life ==
Adruce is the only son of Nik Adelin Dato' Nik Ismail, a Kelantanese Malay banker, and the late Leza Maheran Abdul Ali. Adruce attended school at Sekolah Kebangsaan SS19 Subang Jaya, Selangor, and scored 5As in the Primary School Assessment Test (UPSR). He is also a friend of actor Aedy Ashraf, who also hailed from Kelantan like him (although the former was born and bred there, whilst he was born in the Klang Valley to a Kelantanese migrant father). His artistic talent began to show in a story-telling competition organised by the British Council in 2003 which was held at the Petronas Twin Towers, Kuala Lumpur. This was later followed by a role in a school play, Tiga Abdul ("Three Abduls"). He is known as the presenter on Adik di 9 on TV9, as Bulat in Tentang Bulan, and as Johan on Disney's Waktu Rehat. He's currently doing his studies in accountancy at Universiti Tenaga Nasional, Bandar Muadzam Shah.

On 5 October 2019, Nik tied the knot with Syafiqah Sofian, a former litigation criminal lawyer who recently transitioned her legal career into the corporate world. The couple welcomed their first child, Nik Eleanor Binti Nik Muhammad Farith Adruce, after almost a year of being married.

== Filmography ==
=== Film ===
- Tipah Tertipu (The Trapped Tipah)
- Remp-It (The Street Racers)
- Tentang Bulan (About the Moon)
- Brainscan: Aku dan Topi Ajaib (Brainscan: Me and the Magical Hat)

=== Drama ===
- Pasca Merdeka (Post Independence)
- Anak-Anak Ramadhan (The Children of Ramadhan)
- Waktu Rehat (Break Time)
- Tan & Tun (Tan and Tun)
- Misi Yaya (Yaya's Mission)

=== TV shows ===
- Adik di 9 (Kids at 9)
- Cooking with Chef
- Apa Cerita? (What's d' Story?)
