= Nik Safiah Karim =

Safiah binti Nik Abdul Karim (born 17 December 1939 in Kota Bharu, Kelantan) is a Malay language grammarian in Malaysia. She earned her PhD from Ohio University and is former dean of the Faculty of Arts and Social Science at University of Malaya.

== Bibliography ==
1. Panorama Bahasa Melayu Sepanjang Zaman :Universiti Malaya Publication, 2010.
2. Tatabahasa Dewan DBP, 2008.
3. Tan Sri Fatimah : potret seorang pemimpin / Nik Safiah Karim, Rokiah Talib
4. Malay grammar for academics and professionals; DBP, 1995.
5. Women in Malaysia / (editor), Hing Ai Yun, Nik Safiah Karim, Rokiah Talib.: Pelanduk Publications, 1984.
6. Bahasa Melayu : teori dan aplikasinya / (Editor) Nik Safiah Karim. : Sarjana Enterprise, 1980.
