= Fadlan Hazim =

Malaysian actor singer and model

- فضلن هزيم
- Born: Fadlan Hazim bin Anuwar; 2 January 1992 (age 34); Kuala Lumpur, Malaysia
- Occupations: Actor; Model; Singer
- Years active: 2010–present
- Musical career
- Genre: Pop
- Instruments: Vocal, dance
- Label: KRU Studios

Fadlan Hazim bin Anuwar (born 2 January 1992) is a Malaysian actor, singer, and model.

== Biography ==
Fadlan Hazim was born on January 2, 1992, in Taman Melawati, Kuala Lumpur, Malaysia and is the eldest of four children. Before venturing into the field of singing, he first ventured into the field of demonstration at 16 years old. Fadlan had participated in the Kacak Bergaya Competition in 2010 as the youngest participant. Because he is handsome, not like us.

Fadlan was a member of the V.I.P (Versatility In Performance) group under KRU Talents in June 2010, but withdrew in 2012 to pursue acting.

== Filmography ==
=== Film ===
Year	Title	Role	Notes
2014	Sniper	Rafi	First film
2015	Abang Lejen	Aman	
2015	Banglo Berkunci	Danny	
2017	Jibam The Movie	Fakir	
2019	Sangkar	Hafiz	

=== Television series ===
Year	Title	Role	TV Network
2010	Duyong Aridinata		TV3
2010	Hotel Mania		TV3
2013	Kasih Bukan Dusta	Saiful	TV2
2013	6 Progresif Season 2	Safuan	TV9
2013	Dalam Setiap Sujud	Malik	TV9
2014	Jodoh 2	Nik Fahmi	Astro Ria
2014	Selipar Jepun Stiletto Merah	Roy	HyppTV
2014	Suamiku Jururawat, Isteriku Doktor	Aizat	TV3
2015	Delina	Farid	TV3
2015	Dendam Semalam	Alif	TV3
2015	Dunia Generasi Baru	Rik	TV9
2015	Dhia Sofea	JJ	TV3
2015	Cinta Si Wedding Planner	Ikmal Bazli	TV3
2016	Lip Lap Raya	Adhlan	HyppTV
2016	Kahwin Muda	Syed Rizal	TV3
2017	Papa Ricky	Ricky / Riqmal	Astro Prima
2017	Cinta Hati Batu	Nik Afezal	TV3
2018	Tak Ada Cinta Sepertimu	Azam	Astro Ria
2018	Matahari Cerah Lagi	Adam	TV Okey
2018	Semerah Cinta Humairah	Saiful	TV3
2018	Seribu Rindu	Dr Airil	TV3
2018	Raisha 2	Rashdan	TV3
2019	Semua Salahku	Iqbal	TV3
2019	Dia Adelia	Irhan	TV2
2019	Manis Agnes Jam 5	Arie	TV Okey
2019	Manuskrip Sinta	Dr. Izak Ashaal	TV1

=== Television movie ===
Year	Title	Role	TV Network
2013	3 Cinta 1 Novel		Astro Prima
2014	Raya Kosong-Kosong	Ustaz Azlee	Astro Prima
2014	Gugurl Propa		HyppTV
2015	Aku Kaya Raya Ni!		Astro Prima
2015	Sopeah Jin	Tajudin	TV3
2015	Ini Jalan Kita	Zack	TV Alhijrah
2015	Bila Ajal Menanti	Noh	TV Alhijrah
2016	Mama Untuk Isteriku	Akim	TV2
2016	Cinta Si Wedding Planner Raya	Ikmal Bazli	TV3
2016	Hey Missy	Syazwan	TV1
2017	Encik Ustaz	Faradi	Salam HD
2018	Ratu Kebaya Masuk U		TV2
2018	Azam	Saiful	TV3
2018	Secarik Kasih Mama	Yazman	TV Okey
2018	DM Hati Awak	Iskandar	ntv7
2019	Mia Diyana	Amar	Salam HD
2019	Cinta Alif Ba Ta		RTM

=== Web series ===
Year	Title	Role	Network
2018	KL Gangster: Underworld	Jihan	Iflix
2025–2026	Santau Perempuan Terlarang	Ako Daniel	Tonton

== Awards and nominations ==
Year	Award	Category	Nominated work	Result
2014	28th Bintang Popular Berita Harian Awards	Most Popular Male New Artist	—N/a	Nominated
2015	27th Malaysia Film Festival	Most Promising Actor	Sniper	Nominated
2016	3rd Kuala Lumpur Drama Festival Awards	Choice Actor Award	Dunia Generasi Baru	Nominated
2016	3rd Kuala Lumpur Drama Festival Awards	Choice Couple Award (with Zahirah MacWilson)	Dunia Generasi Baru	Nominated
2017	4th Kuala Lumpur Drama Festival Awards	Choice Actor Award	Kahwin Muda	Nominated
2019	6th Kuala Lumpur Drama Festival Awards	Choice Antagonist Award	Seribu Rindu	Nominated
