= Nasiruddin Nasir =

Malaysian actor

- Born: Muhammad Nasiruddin Nasir; 4 April 1997 (age 29); Malaysia
- Occupation: Actor
- Years active: 2006–present

Muhammad Nasiruddin Nasir (Jawi: محمد ناصرالدين ناصر; born 4 April 1997) also known as Nasiruddin Nasir is a Malaysian actor of Indian-Muslim descent. He is known for portraying Satiya in Hikayat Putera Syazlan and as Suresh in Disney's Waktu Rehat.

== Filmography ==
=== Film ===
- Tentang Bulan (About the Moon)
- Brainscan: Aku dan Topi Ajaib (Brainscan: Me and the Magical Hat)
- 9 September
- Semerah Cinta Stiletto (As Red as Stiletto's Love)

=== Drama ===
- Hikayat Putera Shazlan (The Tale of Prince Shazlan) Season 1,2 & 3
- Waktu Rehat (The Break Time) Season 1,2 & 3
- Tentang Bulan the Series.
- Klon TV2
- Kampung Simpang Burung TV3
- Kelas Sebelah RTM1
- Udin dan Noni (EDU WEB TV)
- Khatan Astro Prima
- Biarkan dia berlari RTM
- CDKET (Cari Duit Poket) Raya RTM
- Selamat Hari Raya 'sayangku'
- Nana Nini Nunu
- Kad Raya untuk Tun Dr Mahathir
- Alang Menanti Malang (Astro Warna)
- Puteri Pulau Tuba RTM 2
- E-Toyol.com TV3
- Malam 7 Likur NTV7
- Jan Jan Jala RTM

=== Theater ===
- Telur Oh Telur
- Teater Tari Naga Tasik Chini

=== Commercial ===
- Telekom Malaysia (TM)
- Ribena
- Tune Talk (Justin Bieber)

=== Hosting ===
- Kids On2
- PMR TVIQ

== Education ==
=== Degree ===
- Bachelor of Accounting (Hons.)

Universiti Tenaga Nasional
