= Soloz: Game of Life =

- Teaser
- Directed by: Syafiq Yusof
- Written by: Nazifdin Nasrudin; Syafiq Yusof
- Produced by: Rahila Ali
- Starring: Hun Haqeem; Ikmal Amry; Syafie Naswip; Noki K-Clique; Jihaa Sham
- Cinematography: Oscar Tong
- Edited by: Ariff Aiman Azahar; Syafiq Yusof; Nazifdin Nasrudin
- Music by: Azri Yunus; Hakim Kamal
- Production companies: Key Billions; Moonton (franchise owner)
- Distributed by: Skop Productions
- Release date: 23 January 2025 (Malaysia)
- Running time: 139 minutes
- Country: Malaysia
- Language: Malay

Soloz: Game of Life is a 2025 Malaysian biographical drama film about esports legend Muhammad Faris Zakaria (Soloz), directed by Syafiq Yusof.

== Plot ==
A teenager gamer named Soloz goes through various challenges to succeed as a professional and successful player in the arena of mobile video games, Mobile Legends: Bang Bang. The story starts when Soloz recounts his rise during a livestream in school, taking viewers back to his modest beginnings in sleepy village. An ambitious gamer with a knack for competition struggles against his strict mother, Lailatul (played by Lisdawati), who sees gaming as a waste of time. Thankfully, his supportive father (Fauzi Nawawi) reignites his competitive spirit.

From dominating cyber café (underground) tournaments to enduring a turbulent battle with Team Saurian before finding his place in Team The Boss, Soloz's journey is a set of victories, setbacks, and familial tension. Along the way, he meets Maryam, his future wife and grounding force, and locks horns with Irfan, a.k.a. Mr X (Ikmal Amry), his Singaporean rival. Their rivalry peaks at an international tournament, where Soloz battles Irfan.

Together with his teammates, they learn about the value of friendship and sportsmanship.

== Release ==
Soloz: Game of Life was released on 23 January 2025 in Malaysia, Singapore and Brunei. It receive warm welcome in Malaysia and Brunei on its first week release.

== Cast and characters ==
- Hun Haqeem as Soloz, an ambitious village boy from Negeri Sembilan, behind his calm demeanor there is burning desire within him. Soloz and his crew member name start to get recognition after beating Team Saurian, arguably the strongest team in his region and dark horse win against Singaporean Vengeance. Though many of his family member, friends and even fiancée are disapproving his decision to continue in esports.
- Ikmal Amry as Irfan, egoistical Malay man from Singapore. Essentially having strong anti-villain persona, Irfan unbendable will make him very formidable foe for Soloz to overcome. After his defeat, he focus everything he have to defeat the new emerging nemesis.
- Syafie Naswip as Fizul, Soloz good friend. Always support him from the beginning. Fizul role is crucial in several match against Vengeance.
- Noki K-Clique as Safwan, want to reach the peak of South East Asia Esports with his fellow pals, but both of his parent don't agree with his career decision. His phone got smashed by his own father.
- Hafeez Mikail as DaddyHood, short boy with a big heart.
- Jaa Suzuran as Wafiey, energetic and have good humor.
- Wafiy as Afiq, one of Soloz crew
- Imran Aqil as Anding, Soloz crew
- Kahoe Hon as Ivan, Chinese from Singapore. He advised Irfan to leave Soloz alone, as he is the one who persistently taunting him. Irfan scold him and said that he should take thing more seriously and train harder for the upcoming grand battle.
- Nia Atasha as Emma, initially side with Ivan but in the end he follow Irfan decision.
- Jihaa Sham as Maryam, Soloz fiancée in later part of the story. At first disapproving of Soloz decision
- Fimie Don as Xavier
- Ezra Kairo as Cypher
- Hezza-Ezzickry Helmy as Franco
- Gbril as Gbril
- Zaid Erakad as Erakad
- Fauzi Nawawi as Zakaria
- Lisdawati as Lailatul
- Arash Mohamad as Ibrahim
- Azizah Mahzan as Mak Cik Flat
- Anne Abdullah as Safwan Mother, she support her husband decision.
- Luis Amante Pinero as Safwan Father, smash Safwan phone. He want his son, Safwan to work other normal and common job.
- Mhia Farhana as Sara
- Mikael Noah as Irfan (child)
- Iman Zarif Akram as Soloz (child)
- Aiman Laphel as host of MPL
- Jane Teoh as the Hostess of Asia Heroes
- Farid Amirul as the Host of Asia Heroes
- Putera "Mars" as cameo, water seller
- Soloz as cameo, Singaporean supporter, ready to back his idol (Irfan) and call the leader of The Boss (Soloz) as "Poyo".
- Remy Ishak as Abang Ketam, for special appearance

Some character from video game series, Mobile Legends: Bang Bang appear on the film such as Helcurt and Gusion.

== Soundtracks ==
Soundtrack for the Soloz: Game of Life titled, Untuk Semua Jiwa was released in December 2024. Sang by Hun Haqeem and Noki K-Clique. Second track titled, To The Finish Line was released in January 2025 by Vanessa Reynauld and Rebel Asia.
