= Nik family of Kelantan =

Family in Malaysia

The Nik family refers to people who have the Nik (Jawi: نىٔ or نيق) title in front of their names in Malaysia. The Nik family largely originated from the state of Kelantan, which is located on the east coast of the Malaysian Peninsula. As Nik is an inherited title by inheritance, it is customary for the title to be passed on to the children of a father who has the Nik title. Rarely, the title is also passed on from a mother having the Nik title.

The title derives from Malay نينيق nenek which was applicable for both male (i.e. "grandfather" parallel to datuk “ibid.” or its clipped form tok) and female grandparents as attested in record of Frederick de Houtman's dictionary made in the beginning of the 17th century, nenek however has centuries since semantically narrowed to mean "grandmother".

According to the history of Kelantan, the first recognised Sultan of Kelantan, Sultan Muhammad I, was also known as Nik Muhammadiah. The first king of Reman in Upper Pattani and Upper Perak was also known as Tok Nik Leh. Nik may used who have descend royal blood from a mother or a daughter of a royal family mother who married a commoner.

According to Kelantanese historian and writer Nakula (pen name of Abdullah bin Mohamed, 1931-1998), the Niks in Kelantan, Pattani (now part of southern Thailand) are believed to be the offspring of Nik Ali, who was an important official under the rulers of Pattani. Nik Ali was also known as Fakih Ali Malbari (Fakih meaning islamic jurist) and studied Islam in India. Also it is customary in Kelantan and Pattani that when a princess marries a common man, their children will bear the Nik title.

== Notable members of the Nik family ==
- Nik Abdul Aziz bin Nik Mat, former Menteri Besar of Kelantan.
- Nik Ahmad Kamil bin Nik Mahmud, former Speaker of the Dewan Rakyat
- Nik Abduh, Member of Parliamentary seat of Pasir Mas.
- Nik Hashim bin Nik Abdul Rahman, Federal Court of Malaysia judge
- Nik Abdul Rashid bin Nik Abdul Majid, former Director of Institute Teknologi MARA (ITM)
- Nik Elin Zurina binti Nik Abdul Rashid, lawyer and activist, plaintiff of Nik Elin v Kelantan
- Nik Nazmi bin Nik Ahmad, Member of Dewan Rakyat for Setiawangsa, Minister of Natural Resources, Environment and Climate Change
- Nik Ramlah binti Nik Mahmood, managing director of the Securities Commission
- Nik Zainiah binti Nik Abd. Rahman, director general of the Malaysia Productivity Corporation.
- Nik Mustapha bin Raja Abdullah, former vice-chancellor of Universiti Putra Malaysia
- Nik Abdul Rashid @ Nik Idris bin Nik Ismail (deceased), Independent Non-Executive Director/Chairman of Kosmo Technology Industrial Berhad. Former Head of Faculty of Business Department Universiti Kebangsaan Malaysia (UKM). former deputy vice-chancellor (UKM), co-chairman of Besta Distributors Sdn Bhd.
- Nik Safiah binti Nik Abdul Karim, Educationist and activist for women's development and rights.
- Nik Muhammad Farith Adruce bin Nik Adelin, TV host and actor
- Nik Ahmad Fadly bin Nik Leh, footballer
- Nik Zul Aziz bin Nik Nawawi, footballer
- Nik Mohd Shahrul Azim bin Nik Abdul Halim, footballer
- Nik Esah binti Nik Ahmed Kamil, compiler of the book Nik's Kitchen, special menus of the Kelantan cuisine.
- Nik Saiful Adli bin Burhan @ Jaohari, Exco Pemuda UMNO Malaysia, Deputy Chairman of Gabungan Pelajar Melayu Semenanjung (GPMS) Malaysia, Leftenan Kolonel / Commander of Pasukan CDERT Angkatan Pertahanan Awam (APM) Ketereh, Kelantan, Advocate and Solicitor High Court of Malaya, The Chairman & Founder of Himpunan Siswazah Kelantan UiTM & Penolong Pengarah BTN Jabatan Perdana Menteri
- Nik Faizah binti Mustapha, Ketua Pergerakan Pandu Puteri Malaysia
