= Amirulhakim Lokman =

Malaysian actor (born 1991)

- Born: Amirulhakim bin Ahmad Lokman; 22 September 1991 (age 34); Kuching, Sarawak, Malaysia
- Occupations: Actor, Journalist, News Presenter
- Years active: 2010–present
- Parent: Ahmad Lokman Abdul Hadi (father)

Amirulhakim bin Ahmad Lokman (Jawi: أميرولحاكيم أحمد لقمان born 22 September 1991 in Kuching, Sarawak, Malaysia) is a Malaysian actor and currently a broadcast journalist and news presenter for TV3. He is known for his first television role as Anding in Disney's Waktu Rehat.
