= Cindy Alisha =

Malaysian actress and TV host (born 1985)

- Born: Cindy Alisha; 12 December 1985 (age 39); Malaysia
- Occupation(s): Actress and TV Host
- Years active: 2003–present

Cindy Alisha (born December 12, 1985) is a Malaysian actress and TV host. She is known for portraying Mindy - the school reporter in Disney's Waktu Rehat.
