= List of Waktu Rehat episodes =

The following is a list of episodes of Disney Channel Asia original television series, Waktu Rehat. The series premiered on 31 August 2010 and ended on 30 September 2012, with a total of 52 episodes over the course of 3 seasons. As of 2026, all episodes are available on Disney+ in Malaysian regions.

== Series overview ==
Season	Episodes	Originally released	
Season	Episodes	First released	Last released
1	16	August 31, 2010	December 25, 2010
2	21	March 12, 2011	September 14, 2011
3	15	March 10, 2012	September 30, 2012

== Episodes ==
=== Season 1 (2010) ===
No.	Title	Original release date
1	"Durian Breath / Nafas Durian"	August 31, 2010
Amirah has a strange, fond breath, because of eating durians. Syed seizes this opportunity to win her heart by matching with her funky breath. Rule numbers: 302B, 5D Absent:Julie, Suresh, Mindy, Anding
2	"Cinderella"	September 4, 2010
Wai Chong got saved by someone and he tries to find out who saved him. Syed and Johan must help him find his "Cinderella". But at first, they suspected that Wai Chong's Cinderella was Sureshbecause of his missing shoe and was carrying his sister's backpack. And then they suspected that it was Luna because of mentioning that she had lost her shoe and the shoe was in the a pink box. In the end, Syed and Johan both get detention and now must whiten & chalk the school shoes. Rule numbers: 3082A Absent:Amirah, Mindy, Faiz, Anding
3	"Brotherly Love / Abang Oh Abang"	September 5, 2010
Johan becomes frustrated and upset when he finds out that his little sister, Julie has a boyfriend that looks a lot like [Nick Jonas]. He, along with Faiz try to get her Maths notebook and sees her photo and they ask the students who that guy is. But the students keep laughing at them and when Mindy alerts that there is a Camp Rock 2: The Final Jam contest, Syed & Johan learns that the winner gets to have a photo with Nick Jonas and the winner was Julie. In the end, Julie's real boyfriend turns out to be a student from school named Nik. Rule Numbers: No rule numbers. Absent:Suresh, Anding
4	"Birthday Surprise / Selamat Harijadi"	September 11, 2010
Anding is angry at Syed for pulling a prank on him on his birthday. When Syed finds out that it is Anding's birthday from Amirah, he decides to apologize to Anding and give him a birthday surprise. But Wai Chong, who suspects that Syed is trying to pull another prank on Anding, prevents that "prank" from happening to Anding and Anding decides to face his fear and the surprise turns out to be Suresh eating a cake. Rule Numbers: 300A, 2055F Absent:Julie, Mindy
5	"Suresh's Secret Recipe / Resepi Rahsia Suresh"	September 12, 2010
When there is a Curry Puff competition coming up, Syed finds out that Amirah loves boys who can cook and decides to enter. At first, Syed's curry puff filling was very hot & spicy but then discovers Suresh's cooking talent and decides to swap his curry puff's with Suresh's. And then, at the competition, Amirah loves 'Suresh's Curry Puffs' and it turns out that Amirah loves very hot & spicy curry puffs. much to Syed's dismay. Rule Numbers: No rule numbers. Absent:Julie, Faiz, Anding
6	"Amnesia"	September 18, 2010
Johan loses his memory in a sport's accident, and some friends help to gain his memory back, while others mischievously try to take advantage of the situation. Johan ended up gaining his memory back and found out that Julie was behind the whole thing. Rule numbers: 532B, 382A Paragraph 5 Absent:Amirah, Suresh, Anding
7	"King of the School / Raja Sekolah"	September 19, 2010
Wai Chong is reading a book on how to get the Principal's power, then falls to the floor because of Syed. Then Syed told everyone that the Principal is gone and needs someone to replace him. Everyone requests that Wai Chong becomes the principal and he agrees. Then he becomes the king, then the emperor of the school. Faiz tries to be emperor by telling some things, and make Amirah his queen, and the throne was his. And everyone told Wai Chong that everything's a dream. When Wai Chong woke up, everyone ran because they saw the Principal. Wai Chong, thinking he's dreaming again, shouted at the Principal and gets detention. Rule numbers: 633C Paragraph 10, 115B, 303/303E Absent:Johan, Julie
8	"Let's Get Fit / Hidup Sihat"	September 25, 2010
Anding felt bad when he couldn't keep up with Luna on their way to school, so Johan decides to help him exercise. Turns out, Luna liked guys with brains, not "strong and macho". Rule numbers: No rule numbers. Absent:Amirah, Julie, Wai Chong, Mindy, Faiz
9	"The Shuffle Champion / Juara Shuffle"	September 25, 2010
Faiz kept teasing Anding about how he can't shuffle, so Anding challenged Faiz to a shuffling competition. At the end, Anding won the competition and Faiz practices his shuffling skills after losing the competition. Rule numbers: No rule numbers. Absent:Johan, Julie, Suresh
10	"Bowling Buddies / Rakan Bowling"	September 26, 2010
Johan and Amirah were supposed to be bowling buddies at the bowling competition, but Johan got injured, so Kieran was the substitute. Amirah was afraid that she can't meet cute guys anymore. So Mindy, Luna, and Amirah tries to turn Kieran into a girl. But, Kieran tries to turn Amirah into a boy after the pan didn't work out. Rule numbers: No rule numbers. Absent:Julie, Suresh, Wai Chong, Faiz
11	"Fortune Teller / Mesin Ahli Nujum"	September 26, 2010
Anding was sick of not knowing when Luna would come near him when he wasn't ready. So, Suresh suggested that Anding should make a fortune teller. So he did, and named it Luna Too. Wai Chong saw it and tried to use it to tell when students were gonna break the rules. Sometimes, he gets the wrong meaning and punished the students for the wrong reasons. When Luna Too said that Luna won't accept Anding's flowers, he got so mad that he smashed Luna Too. Rule numbers: No rule numbers. Absent:Amirah, Julie, Kieran, Mindy
12	"Haunted Help / Pertolongan Pak Syukor"	November 13, 2010
Syed and Suresh fall for Johan's prank and decide to visit their 'haunted' school at night to ask the 'resident' ghost for answers to their upcoming History test. While Johan cheers, Mindy has been secretly watching Johan. The next day at school, Syed and Suresh read Mindy's article and chase Johan for pranking them. At last, Anding runs away too because of the voice of the 'resident' ghost. Rule numbers: No rule numbers. Absent:Amirah, Luna, Julie, Kieran, Wai Chong, Faiz
13	"Solar Eclipse / Gerhana"	November 13, 2010
For the first time, the solar eclipse occurred, and Syed and Johan tried to prank the other students. Then, strange things started to happen. The students start to swap personalities. Faiz turns into Kieran, Kieran into Faiz, and Wai Chong with Amirah. Finally, Johan and Syed realize they got pranked by all "swapped" students in revenge of previous pranks. Rule numbers: 3000A Absent:Luna, Julie, Suresh
14	"Nice Luna, Naughty Luna / Luna Baik, Luna Nakal"	December 4, 2010
Luna's identical-looking cousin, Lina, is visiting the school, but before Luna can show her around and introduce her to all her friends, Luna gets a massive stomachache and has to go to the toilet. Luna's friends start mistaking Lina for Luna, and Lina decides to act as Luna for the day. Rule numbers: No rule numbers. Absent:Johan, Amirah, Kieran, Faiz
15	"The Bully / Kaki Buli"	December 25, 2010
A new student arrives and turns out to be a bully. Everyone faces the bully but end up getting beaten up by him. So, Luna devises a plan to teach the bully a lesson. Rule Numbers: No rule number.
16	"Gossip / Gosip"	December 25, 2010
Mindy announces that a new student, Azza, will be joining the school. Supposedly, she is very pretty and very smart, and the boys immediately make plans to impress her in their own individual ways. Finally, Azza arrived and turns out to be a boy. Rule numbers: No rule numbers. Absent:Julie, Kieran, Wai Chong, Faiz Note:This is the last appearance of Johan and Mindy as they no longer appeared in Season 2 and Season 3 afterwards.

=== Season 2 (2011) ===
No.	Title	Original release date
17	"School of Zombies / Sekolah Zombie"	March 12, 2011
Syed and Suresh began to sleep after playing a zombie video game. When they fall asleep again, they dream that the whole school has been transformed into zombies. In the end, they felt it was just a dream but their dreams came true when they see themselves as zombies in the mirror. Note: Faiz, Luna, Kieran, Anding And Wai Chong to become Zombie at Syed and Suresh's dream. Rule numbers: 17F Absent:Julie, Amirah, Adam Note 2:Adam was absent before episode 4.
18	"Wai Chong's Whistle / Wisel Wai Chong"	March 12, 2011
Wai Chong was rewarded a whistle for becoming the top prefect in the country. After receiving the whistle, he suddenly becomes a severely strict authoritarian school prefect. Rule numbers: 633C Paragraph 10, 12A Paragraph 5, 75F Absent:Julie, Amirah, Anding, Suresh, Adam
19	"The New Big Brother / Abang Baru"	March 13, 2011
Johan was recently transferred to a sports school. He entrusted Syed to take a good care of his little sister, Julie. After being acquired by this new responsibility, Syed took some extreme measures devoting himself to ensure the well-being of Julie. Julie, on the other hand, feels rather distorted by the measures taken by Syed, since he will always follow her. Rule numbers: No Rule Numbers Absent:Adam
20	"The New Kid / Budak Baru"	March 19, 2011
Adam was recently transferred into the school, resulting the female students to a biebermania hysterical proportion due to his singing ability. The male students however, were not so amused by the new kid. especially Syed and Anding. But after Adam shows that he just wants to make friends, they become his friends and make a music video with him. Rule numbers: No Rule Numbers Absent:Kieran
21	"Syed The Hypnotist / Syed Si Pemukau"	March 20, 2011
Syed learns how to hypnotize from a book. He tries it out on a number of his friends but fails to their amusement. He doesn't give up and tests his hypnotizing skills on Faiz. To his surprise, it works! Syed gets Faiz to do small favours for him until he realizes that he can get Faiz to do greater things, like helping him to get Amirah. In the end, Syed had no idea that he fell for his friends' trick HOOK, LINE AND SINKER! Note: Hypnotizing line: Gaga goo goo lala loo loo tik tok tik tok now I command you! Rule numbers: No Rule Numbers Absent:Julie, Adam
22	"Kieran's Health Regimen / Rejimen Kesihatan Kieran"	March 26, 2011
With Johan's departure, Kieran is appointed as the first female School Sports Captain. The power goes to her head and she becomes maniacal in enforcing a healthy lifestyle on the students. Wai Chong, at first, completely agrees with her, until the others point out that Wai Chong as a prefect should set a good example under this healthy lifestyle campaign. It's not long before Wai Chong begs the others to get him out from under Kieran's thumb... Note: The winner of Waktu Rehat Aksi which is Siti Hara Rashid comes to Waktu Rehat. Rule numbers: 18C
23	"Beauty And The Bookworm / Si Cantik Dan Ulat Buku"	March 27, 2011
The boys are excited when a men's magazine, Kacak, holds a contest to find a cover model among its readers. Anding wants to take part too but the other boys laugh him off, saying that geeks cannot be models. In the meantime, there is a contest to find a Female Scientist of the Future, and the price is a trip to Epcot, Walt Disney World. Amirah is dying to go, but her friends do not think she is smart enough. Frustrated at how they are pigeonholed, Anding and Amirah decide to help each other out. In the end, Amirah won the Female Scientist of the Future as Anding named as SM Jalan Mas Next Top Model. Rule numbers: No Rule Numbers Absent:Kieran, Wai Chong
24	"The Last Cheerleader / Ahli Sorak Terakhir"	May 28, 2011
Suresh wants to be in the cheerleading squad after looking at the girls. But Amirah doesn't want him in her squad. So she tries to force the rest of the boys to try out. But Julie helps Suresh, and in the end Suresh is in the squad but another problem comes up. Rule numbers: No Rule Numbers
25	"Student Icon / Pelajar Ikon"	June 4, 2011
TV Pelajar (The Student's Channel) A national television in Malaysia, is organizing a student youth icon competition. The contestants are required to submit their tapes on their achievements to be evaluated. The contest caused a frenzy in the school as Kieran, Wai Chong, and Amirah strive to win the competition. Rule numbers: No Rule Numbers
26	"The Cockatoo / Burung Kakaktua"	June 4, 2011
Wai Chong brings a parrot in the school named Kuat as the school mascot, which is actually a spy. So they think of a plan to stop Kuat. Wai Chong places a cockatoo in the school hallway and announces that it is the new school mascot. To the delight of the students, the cockatoo can talk and have conversations with them. Unknown to them, its real purpose is to spy on the students and report on their wrongdoings to Wai Chong. In the end, Kuat is gone but Wai Chong brings another parrot nameD Tugas, giving them another problem. Rule numbers: No Rule Numbers
27	"First Love / Cinta Pertama"	June 11, 2011
A new person starts to steal Faiz's business. When Faiz goes to confront the person, he finds out that G is a girl and falls in love. Then Faiz tries find his new love and tell her how he feels. Note: Two parts with two endings. Rule numbers: No Rule Numbers
28	"The Champion / Juara"	June 18, 2011
Kieran wants to win school competitions to show that she is the best sports captain, but wonders if she should try other ways to guarantee that she will win. This episode is visited by Azlan Iskandar. Note: Two parts and two endings. Rule numbers: No Rule Numbers
29	"Clean Up Day / Gotong Royong"	June 19, 2011
When Syed And Suresh are assigned to give everyone a task for clean up day, they can't decide who gets the toilet duty. When Syed devises a plan that the last person to pick gets toilet duty. Unfortunately, when Amirah gets toilet duty, Syed and Suresh clean the toilets for her. But in the end, Amirah wouldn't have had suffered because her uncle owns a cleaning company. Rule numbers: Number 4, Paragraph 4
30	"BFF"	July 3, 2011
In an uncharacteristic slip, Luna mildly chastises Amirah for her excessive vanity. A super-touchy Amirah takes offence and the two girls end up in an argument, witnessed by the whole school. Sensing an opportunity, Syed offers his best-friendship to Amirah. Rule numbers: No Rule Numbers
31	"Robot Kieran / Robo Kieran"	August 23, 2011
Kieran doesn't have enough time to do all the things she wants and study, so Anding builds a robot version of her. Unfortunately, Kieran doesn't have enough time to fill out the personality form, so Amirah does instead, which leads to an Amirah like Kieran running around the school. In the end, Kieran cuts some of her activities to give her enough time to study. Rule numbers: No Rule Numbers
32	"Where Amirah? / Mana Amirah?"	August 24, 2011
Wai Chong found A Photo of Amirah looking like she was afraid. When everyone sees the picture, they make their own ideas to what happened to her. In the end, however, Amirah actually was taking pictures of different emotions for a play. Rule numbers: No Rule Numbers
33–34	"Legend of Squire Anding / Hikayat Hang Anding"	August 31, 2011
Wai Chong read the Legend of Hang Tuah but he doesn't understand the legend. To help him, Anding has him to imagine that he is in the story of Hang Tuah, where Hang Tuah (Anding) gets "expelled" for having a crush on who he thinks is the prettiest girl in school (Luna). And when General Mustache (Syed) hears, he thinks that Hang Tuah has a crush on Amirah. So he tells the Sultan(Adam). When the Sultan hears that Hang Tuah has a crush on who he thinks is the prettiest girl in school, he thinks of Kieran. So, the mix up leads to Hang Tuah being expelled. When Hang Jebat (Wai Chong) hears that Anding was expelled, he seeks revenge. In the end, Anding and Wai Chong were so immersed into imagining the legend, that they missed the class they were supposed to present the legends for. Note: This episode has two parts. Rule numbers: No Rule Numbers
35	"Today's Horocope / Ramalan Hari Ini"	September 3, 2011
After reading a horoscope and receiving an A in Art class, Kieran and the others begin to believe in Horoscopes. Luna tries to show them that the horoscope won't always be true. Rule numbers: No Rule Numbers Absent: Syed, Julie, Amirah
36–37	"The School Musical/Sekolah Musikal"	September 14, 2011
Julie wants to be in Adam's Musical, but is too shy to tell him. But after Amirah tells him that though she gets the lead in all of the plays, it's Julie who gets the starring role in the musical. So, Adam has Julie as his lead for the musical. Note: This episode has two parts. Rule numbers:

=== Season 3 (2012) ===
No.	Title	Original release date
38	"Amirah, Syed & ...Rosie?!"	March 10, 2012
A new girl, Rosie is transferred to SM Jalan Mas and she meets Luna (Amirah's Best friend). Amirah becomes worried because she is thinks that Rosie would steal all of her friends and popularity. In addition, she is worried that Rosie would steal Syed as her number one fan, as Rosie develops a crush on Syed who is somewhat afraid of her. Rule numbers: No Rule Numbers
39	"Potion Comotion/Botol Merah, Botol Biru"	March 10, 2012
Syed has asked Anding to develop a potion that will enable him to speak the most charming words so he can capture Amirah's heart. At the same time, Wai Chong has asked Anding to create a potion that will make the user to speak only the truth, as he has been the victim of an embarrassing prank in school. Anding manages to create both potions, but gets them mixed up. Syed ends up drinking the truth potion, while Wai Chong happily goes off with the charm potion. Rule numbers: No Rule Numbers
40	"Faiz Get's His Groove Back/Ada Apa Dengan Faiz"	March 18, 2012
After learning that G likes someone else, Faiz loses his ability to shuffle. To try to get him to be happy again, everyone tries to help him try to win G over, even though he actually doesn't want to. At the end, Faiz decide shuffle again. Rule numbers: No Rule Numbers
41	"Kieran's Secret Admirer/Peminant Rahsia Kieran"	March 18, 2012
After receiving a mysterious letter from an admirer, Kieran begins to wonder who it is. In The end, her secret admirer Is Ashraf, but he's still in primary school. Rule numbers: 208 Sub-Section 3
42	"Prefect's Boot Camp/Syed, Suresh Pengawas"	March 25, 2012
Tired of constantly trying to get Syed and Suresh to follow the rules, Wai Chong attempts a reversed psychology by making them prefects. It seems to work but backfires in the end. Rule numbers: 333A, 444A, 444B, 555A, 666A Absent: Amirah, Julie, Anding, Adam, Rosie, Kieran
43	"Wai Chong, Come Back/Pulanglah Wai Chong"	March 25, 2012
All the students are tired of Wai Chong constantly punishing them, so when he puts in a suggestion box, they fill it with mean comments about him. Soon after though, Wai Chong fails to come to school and the students worry that they have hurt his feelings with all the things they said. Rule numbers: No Rule Numbers Absent: Amirah, Kieran, Rosie
44	"The Magical Watch/Jam Ajaib"	May 19, 2012
Syed tries to figure out the supposed "powers" of a watch his grandmother gave him. The others trick him into thinking that it can move you forward or backwards in time, after being tired of him trying to get them involved in helping him. Rule numbers: No Rule Numbers
45	"Fright Night"	May 20, 2012
The boys and girls get into an argument about who's braver. To settle, they spend the night in school and whichever team leaves first will lose. Rule numbers: No Rule Numbers
46	"You're My Inspiration"	June 1, 2012
Julie is trying to write a story for a competition but is having writer's block. Luna tries to help her look for an inspiration. Rule numbers: No Rule Numbers
47	"Fun Fun Fund/Gara-Gara Dana"	June 1, 2012
Everyone has been affected by recent budget cuts at SM Jalan Mas. Only Syed carries on cheerfully, playing pranks on everyone as usual and getting on their nerves. The gang decides to come up with a charity event to raise funds but everyone seems to have their own ideas of what to do. How is the team going to pull off a fund raising event when they can't even come to an agreement in the first place? Rule numbers: No Rule Numbers
48	"B.F.F.E"	June 2, 2012
Luna is in need of a helping hand, but Amirah is too caught up in her cheerleading activities to notice. Instead, Rosie steps up to be there for Luna. As a result of Amirah being so busy, Luna and Rosie become closer friends and when Amirah finally has time for Luna, she finds that Luna already has plans with Rosie. Luna invites Amirah to join them, but Amirah does not want to be a trio! Amirah is upset that she doesn't seem to be Luna's one and only BFF any longer and launches a self-declared war to win Luna back. Rule numbers: No Rule Numbers
49	"Battle of the Nerds"	September 16, 2012
Anding, the champion of all things nerdy, is threatened by a competitor from the rival school when the competitor accuse him of being a fake nerd. Rule numbers: No Rule Numbers
50	"Being No. 2"	September 16, 2012
Rosie used to be a big deal in her old school, but in SM Jalan Mas, it's not so easy. Rule numbers: No Rule Numbers
51–52	"Season Finale Pt.1 & Pt.2"	September 30, 2012
As the school year looms to a close, Syed is desperate for a date with Amirah but is rejected again, unless he turns into Justin Bieber. However, after turning to Justin Bieber and getting rejected again, Syed decides to steal Anding's formula book to make the love potion along with Suresh, but a series of disastrous events happen, such as them blowing up the school's laboratory, which causes both of them to be expelled and getting transferred to a boarding school. Rule numbers: No Rule Numbers Note: This episode has two parts.
