= Hun Haqeem =

Malaysian actor

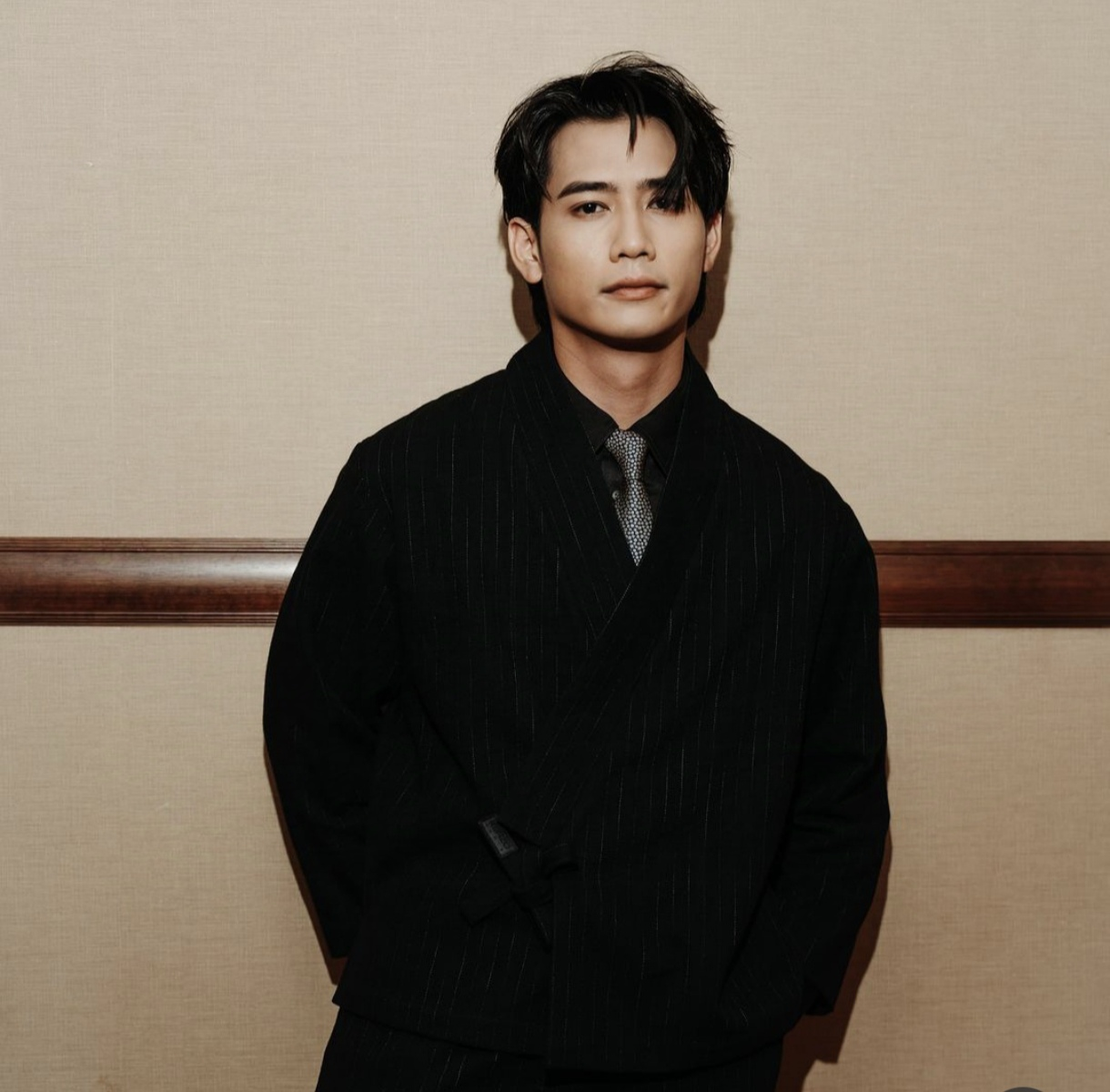
- Haqeem in 2024
- Born: Haqeem bin Hermy; January 7, 1998 (age 28); Kuching, Sarawak, Malaysia
- Education: Corporate Communication
- Alma mater: University of Poly-Tech MARA Kuala Lumpur
- Occupations: Actor; Singer
- Years active: 2019–present
- Height: 166 cm (5 ft 5 in)

Hun Haqeem (born as Haqeem bin Hermy; 7 Januari 1998) is a Malaysian singer and actor. He is known to play as Ariff in his drama debut Cari Aku Di Syurga.

He start his theatrical debut as a young Malaysian Minangkabau named Soloz in Soloz: Game of Life (2025).

== Early life ==
He was born on 7 January 1998 in Kuala Lumpur. He is Muslim and has mixed Malay-Chinese blood through his mother, who is from Kuching, while, of Minangkabau blood, through his father's side. During his childhood, he also spent time growing up in his mother's hometown in Kuching.

He is the youngest of four siblings. He has two older sisters and an older brother, who works as a medical doctor. One of his sisters, Nureen Qistina, is a professional guitarist and former member of the band, X-Pose, a group famous for the song Sandiwara (2017). All three of his siblings are already married.

For his early education, he attended Sekolah Menengah Kebangsaan (SMK) Perimbun, Cheras from Form 1 to Form 5. He then continued his diploma studies at Kolej Universiti Poly-Tech MARA (KUPTM), Kuala Lumpur and successfully completed his studies in Corporate Communications.

== Career ==
He began his involvement in the entertainment industry while undergoing an industry internship at the Corporate Communications Department, New Straits Times Press. In 2018, he began looking for opportunities as a model and actor. His interest was honed in the field of acting at that time, which prompted him to plunge into the entertainment industry, getting out of the usual corporate work environment and working behind the scenes. An additional factor, his interest in being involved in this field was also due to the influence of his parents in addition to his hobby of watching movies.

After graduating from college, he continued his efforts to become an actor while working part-time at Starbucks. His first acting project was an indie telefilm titled Tasbih Usang, in which he was given the lead role alongside veteran actor Namron. This telefilm was aired in early 2019.

=== Early debut: 2019 ===
Early in his involvement in the entertainment industry at the age of 21, his name rose after starring in various drama projects and telefilms. He developed his acting career through several important supporting character roles such as Cari Aku Di Syurga (2019), The Gadis (2020), Pemuja Rahsia (2020) and Kampung People (season 2) (2020).

=== Career leap: 2020–2022 ===
His name became synonymous with the character "Jekfer" among local drama fans, after the drama Kampung People became a hit at the end of 2019. The appearance of its sequel Kampung People (season 2) was also eagerly awaited by many local drama viewers at that time. His character as a village youth in the comedy drama also left a big impact, in addition to being paired with other experienced actors such as Rashidi Ishak, Elly Mazlein and Riena Diana. His sudden popularity made him famous in Malaysia.

=== 2023–present ===
Since his debut, Hun Haqeem has appeared in numerous television dramas and telefilms, establishing himself as a regular presence in the Malaysian entertainment industry and demonstrating versatility through a range of roles.

In 2023, he starred in two quality drama series produced by the OTT platform Viu. Both dramas received critical acclaim as national winners two years in a row at the Asian Academy Creative Awards . In the category of Best Program From Streamer/OTT for the drama series Nenek Bongkok Tiga in 2023 and the category of Best Adaptation of an Existing Format (script) for the drama W – Two Worlds (2024) an adaptation of a famous South Korean drama series, W (TV series). (2016).

According to the June 2024 issue of Augustman magazine, Hun Haqeem is recognized as one of the local entertainment industry's versatile and high-performing young actors.

His great dramas have made his name even more widely known. Through the drama Mandul Bukan Pilihan, according to reviews by Budiey Channel and Astro Gempak, the last episode of the drama was described as a social media phenomenon that managed to leave an impact on local Malay drama viewers because of the compatibility of the actors, the effective storyline & also praise for Hun's emotional acting strength.

=== Dedication in Acting: A ‘Method’ actor ===
In order to realize the character for the drama W: Two Worlds (2023), he was willing to make great sacrifices to get his ideal weight of 68 kg. Once known as a strong-built man, a young man with a sweet smile was loved by many in Kampung People, he worked hard and managed to drastically change his physical shape to meet the demands of his character. Hun managed to lose 12 kg in a month, showing great dedication as an actor.

Courage and hard work proved his commitment as a 'method actor', who tries to delve into the character he plays with all his heart.

In the film Soloz: Game of Life (2025), he starred in the film as an e-sports icon & streamer, famous in the mobile game, 'Mobile Legends'. It was a big challenge because he was not a player of the game Mobile Legends: Bang Bang before. To embody the character as a gamer, Hun has spent months learning the game and mastering its playing techniques.

He also studied the walking style, voice cast, and other aspects of the character of Soloz to ensure that the character can be portrayed accurately and deeply.

=== Style, fashion & trend icons: Global charm ===
In January 2024, he won the NONA Superhero Award 2023 in the Men's Style Icon category. Hun admires the style of Michael B. Jordan, who is known for always maintaining a neat and well-groomed appearance, both in his career and personal life.

His face often attracts the attention of many, because he has a handsome face that is said to have similarities with Korean artists. He was also given the nickname, Oppa Malaysia, by his fans.

== Personal life ==
He was previously known to have been under the management company, MIG Productions. He filed for termination of his contract in 2020 due to an 'extreme contract' (different from others) as a sponsored artist with the company.

On the other hand, he admitted to experiencing mental health problems throughout 2021 & 2022 due to things that cannot be shared publicly. It also affected him and described that period as a challenging year in his life. In 2024, he had recovered and was becoming more efficient in controlling his emotions. His motivation level was increasing.

== Filmography ==
=== Film ===
Year	Title	Role	Notes
2023	Polis EVO 3	Police Officer	Uncredited cameo
2025	Soloz: Game of Life	Soloz/Faris	Debut

=== Television series ===
Year	Title	Role	Channel	Notes
2019	Cari Aku Di Syurga	Ariff	TV3	
2019	Cinta Belum Tamat Tempoh	Qhalish	Astro Ria	
2019–2020	Kampung People	Jaafar	TV3	
2020	Seindah Tujuh Warna Pelangi	Arjuna	TV3	
2020	The Gadis	Mika	TV3	
2020	Kampung People 2	Jaafar / Jekfer	TV3	
2020–2021	Angkara Cinta	Luqman	Astro Prima	
2021	Dayang Senandung	Fannan	TV Okey	
2021	Sihir	Hud	Astro Ria	
2022	Ulya & Dini	Dini	Astro Ria	
2022	Hantu Raya Pergi Perang	Kadir Osman / Raya	Sooka	
2023	Imam Instant Ustazah Scammer	Imam Asyraf	Astro Ria	
2023	Chinta Wrong Direction	Raja Akid	Astro Ria	
2023	My Famous Ex-Boyfriend	Rakan Jamie	Astro Ria	
2024	Ke Kodiang With Love	Ajib	Astro Gempak	
2024	Lagenda Puteri Qaseh 2	Wandika	Astro Ceria	

=== Telemovie ===
Year	Title	Role	Channel	Notes
2019	Tasbih Usang		HyppTV	
2020	Pemuja Rahsia	Adam	TV3	
2021	Tentang Alif	Mat	Astro Ria	
2022	Obses	Lokman	Astro Citra	
2024	Chinta Wrong Direction Raya	Raja Akid	Astro Ria	
