= Juzzthin =

Malaysian actor and rapper

- Born: Muhammad Nazreen bin Norzali; 2 August 1990 (age 35); Kuala Lumpur, Malaysia
- Other name: Juzzthin Nazreen
- Occupations: Rapper; actor
- Years active: 2010–present
- Musical career
- Genres: Hip hop
- Instrument: Vocal
- Label: Mixology Music

Muhammad Nazreen bin Norzali (Jawi: محمد نازرين نورزالي, born 2 August 1990), known professionally as Juzzthin, is a Malaysian rapper and actor. He is known for his television debut for his role as Syed in Disney's Waktu Rehat.

== Filmography ==
=== Film ===
Year	Title	Role	Director	Production	Notes
2016	Bo-Peng	Zack	Helmi Yusof	Pencil Pictures & Records Sdn Bhd	
2017	J Revolusi	Nazreen	Zulkarnain Azhar	Grand Brilliance & Infinitus Productions	

=== Television series ===
Year	Title	Role	TV Channel	Notes
2010 - 2012	Waktu Rehat (Break Time)	Syed	TV9 & Disney Channel Asia	
2014 - 2017	Oh My English!	Zack	Astro Maya HD	

=== Television movies ===
Year	Title	Role	TV Channel	Notes
2017	Lambor Kanan Belakang Dewan	Justin	Astro Maya HD & Astro Prima	
