= Aedy Ashraf =

Malaysian actor

- Born: Mohammad Addy Ashraf Rosmadi; 20 September 1993 (age 32); Kota Bharu, Kelantan, Malaysia
- Occupations: Actor; Film Director; Producer; Host
- Years active: 2003–present

Mohammad Addy Ashraf bin Rosmadi, better known by his stage name Aedy Ashraf (Jawi : ايدي أشرف), is a Malaysian actor. He is known for his role as Faiz in Disney Channel Asia's Waktu Rehat.

== Career ==
He inherited his acting skills from his mother, veteran actress Liza Zain. At the age of 10 in 2003, Aedy began his acting career as a child actor by starring in the comedy film Jutawan Fakir directed by Abdul Razak Mohaideen in which he played the role of Azman, a homeless man. Through this film, he acted alongside big names such as Saiful Apek, Bob Kuman, Waheeda and Farid Kamil

He then appeared in the film Cinta Kolestrol, playing the role of young Ahmad Yusry, while his adult role was played by Yusry Abdul Halim. In 2004, he starred in his first drama, Doa Imran, playing the role of Imran. Aedy gained widespread recognition as a child actor through his role as Mawi in the film Tentang Bulan which was released on 21 December 2006. This film also starred Nik Adruce, Fatin Afeefa and Erin Malek. Through this film, he was nominated for the Best Child Actor category at the 20th Malaysian Film Festival.

He starred in his first telefilm, Cerita Adam which was broadcast on TV1 where he played the role of Rahmat. In 2009, Aedy acted with Elfira Loy who played the title role in the drama Qalesya which was broadcast on Astro Prima where he played the role of Muhammad.

In 2010, Aedy played the role of Faiz in the Disney Channel television series, which also starred Nik Adruce, Sweet Qismina, Tengku Iezahdiyana Nurhanie Tengku Alaudin Tengku Iezahdiyana and Elfira Loy. The series aired for 3 seasons and is a local version of the As the Bell Rings franchise which was adapted from the Italian TV series, Quelli dell'intervallo.

Between 2012 and 2013, he starred in the educational drama Oh My English! for 2 seasons on Astro TVIQ. He played the role of Shafiq, he reprised his role in the telefilm Oh My Ganu!. The drama Separuh Jiwaku (2014) saw him reunite with Elfira Loy. Through the drama broadcast on Slot Ratu TV9, Aedy played the role of Emir Izlan, a village youth who migrated to Kuala Lumpur to work as a driver for Dato' Darwish and Datin Sofinah. He also acted in the drama Kerana Terpaksa Aku Relakan, playing the role of Tajul Zahin, the younger brother of Tajuk Razin played by Amar Baharin.

In 2015, he acted in the last two episodes of the teen drama, Dunia Generasi Baru starring Kaka Azraff, Natasha Elyzza, Erwin Dawson, Fadlan Hazim, Zahirah MacWilson and Ben Amir. A year later, he acted in several TV dramas including Jasmine and Lara Aishah.

In 2017, he acted in the film Dorm Melati directed by Eyra Rahman playing the role of Adam. It was his first film in 11 years since Tentang Bulan (2006) and also his only film in 2017. In the same year, Aedy acted in several television dramas, including Suamiku Paling Sweet as Hakimi, Bahagia Kasihmu as Nazril and Hero Seorang Cinderella as Darius. He then made his music video debut by starring in the music video for the song Pematah Hati sung by Nabila Razali.

Aedy acted in three TV dramas simultaneously in 2018, among them Cinta Tiada Ganti, an adaptation of the Filipino drama Sana'y Wala Nang Wakas produced by ABS-CBN. He plays the role of Mukhriz, which is matched with the character Christian played by Jericho Rosales in the original Filipino version. He also appeared in the drama Papa Nak Menantu played by Jaja Iliyes and Hafidz Roshdi. He also received film acting offers when he starred in two films, namely Blok 404 and Gol & Gincu Vol. 2.

In 2020, he played the role of Tongki in Budak Tebing and reprised his role in its sequel Budak Tebing 2. Other dramas he starred in that year also included Memoir Kamila and Biar Mereka Cemburu. In 2021, he also appeared in the educational drama Projek: Anchor SPM which revolves around students who sit for the Sijil Pelajaran Malaysia (SPM) examination around 2000. The drama directed by Razaisyam Rashid also starred Daiyan Trisha and Shasha Abedul. He also acted alongside Amelia Henderson in the drama Kisah Cinta Kita which aired on Slot Akasia TV3.

In 2026, he starred in the action film Tarung: Unforgiven as Isa and at the same time made his debut as a producer through the film under the production company Alpha47 Films.
