= Elfira Loy =

Malaysian actress and model

- الفيرة لوي
- Born: Nurul Elfira Loy binti Ahmad Sabri; 8 March 1994 (age 32); Kuala Lumpur, Malaysia
- Other names: El, Elfira Loy
- Occupations: Actress; Model; Businesswoman; Influencer
- Years active: 2006—present
- Spouse: Muhd Faris Khairol Anuar (m. 2019)
- Children: Muhamad Rayyan Khalaf; Nur Aria Mikayla
- Parent(s): Ahmad Sabri Hj Ariffin (father); Filzah binti Yusoff (mother)
- Relatives: Ahmad Ezzraa Loy; Nurul Ezlisa Loy; Ahmad Ezzrin Loy; Ahmad Evvraa Loy
- Website: Nurul Elfira Loy – New Official Paginstagram [https://instagram.com/elfiraloy

Nurul Elfira Loy binti Ahmad Sabri (born March 8, 1994) also known by her popular name Elfira Loy is a Malaysian actress. She debuted in her first telemovie drama Cinta Itu Buta where she acted as a school girl. She is known for her role as Qalesya in the hit drama Qalesya and as Amirah in Disney's Waktu Rehat. Elfira's siblings, Ahmad Ezzrin Loy and Nurul Ezlisa Loy are both actors.

== Early life ==
Nurul Elfira Loy Binti Ahmad Sabri, was born on 8 March 1994 in Kuala Lumpur, Malaysia. She is the second child of Ahmad Sabri Haji Ariffin and Filzah Yusoff, having an older brother named Ahmad Ezzraa Loy, a younger sister named Nurul Ezlisa Loy, and two younger brothers, Ahmad Ezzrin Loy and Ahmad Evvraa Loy. She is of Malay, Chinese and Arabian descent. She had completed her tertiary education at KDU University College, in Ent Arts.

=== Early Years (2006–2011) ===
Elfira started her acting career at the age of 12 as a child performer in Ali Baba: The Musical Theater (2006). She represented Malaysia with seven other child actors for Ali Baba: The Musical Theater in Hamedan International Theater Festival for Children and Youth Adults that took place on 27 September to 5 October 2010. She also involved for Ibu Zain Theater Season 1 and 2. She was dubbed in her first telemovie drama as titled Cinta Itu Buta performed as school girl character. She continued her interest in acting and involved in many dramas. She made an appearance in Damping Malam (2010). She played the character Rin in a Japanese film titled 'Second Chance' that was released in 2011. At the same time, Elfira was also chosen as the new representative and endorsed by Astro for two years. This meant that Elfira was 'pegged' and not allowed to star in any non-Astro production. (2011–2012)

=== Recent Career (2012–present) ===
In 2012, she acted as Juju in the movie Jangan Ambil Padang Kami; a story based on life of flat residents and Bella in hit drama Dalam Hati Ada Taman (2012) together with Randy Pangalila. Elfira also worked on several film projects such as Rentap: The Movie, Plus One, Permata Hatiku, etc. She was also appointed as the brand ambassador for Maybelline New York (Malaysia) (2012) and Sofy (2013).

=== TV commercials ===
Elfira Loy is also model and actress for TV commercials and advertisements for brands such as Motosikal Honda, Sunway Lagoon, Mee Sedap, Institut Jantung Negara, Bank RHB, Mamee Slurp and The New Face Of Maybelline New York (Malaysia).

== Filmography ==
=== Film ===
Year	Title	Role	Notes
2010	Damping Malam	–	Issued
2011	Second Chance	Rin	Issued; Japan Film
2014	Ribbit	Sandy	Issued
2014	Rentap	Elaina	

=== Drama ===
Year	Title	Role	Director	Notes	Episode	Production	TV Station
2008	Tentang Bulan The Series	Zurina	Mazri Musafa	Main Actress	26	Metrowealth International Group (MIG)	Astro Prima
2009	Roh Natrah	Natrah	Khairul (Wak Lu)	Issued	13		TV2
2009	Qalesya 1	Qalesya	Sridhar Jetty Al Bakri	Main Actress		Nusantara Seri Karya	Astro Ria
2009–2010	Senja Permai	Yasmine		Supporting Actress	68	Nusantara Seri Karya	Astro Prima
2010	Chinta	Chinta (young)	Ahmad Puad Onah	Supporting Actress	28	Grand Brilliance	TV3
2010	Syurgamu Ramadhan	Suzana	Shahrulezad Mohameddin	Main Actress	14	Radiusone Sdn Bhd	TV3
2010	Qalesya 2	Qalesya		Main Actress		Nusantara Seri Karya	Astro Prima
2011	Kum Kum: The Series	Tini	Michael Ang	Supporting Actress	13	Cube Film Sdn Bhd	Astro Ria
2011	Hani	Nisa		Issued	13		TV3
2011	Samson dan Delaila	Amira	Ahmad Puad Onah	Supporting Actress	23	Grand Brilliance	TV3
2012	Jangan Ambil Padang Kami	Juju	Joeza Rasidi	Supporting Actress	13	Suhan Movies Trading	Astro Ria
2012	Dalam Hati Ada Taman	Bella	Michael Ang	Main Actress	13	Cube Film Sdn Bhd	Astro Ria
2013	Tanggang Ayu	Alissa	Michael Ang	Supporting Actress	28	Cube Film	Astro Prima
2013	Demi Dia	Azura	Aziz M Osman	Main Actress	24	Ace Motion Sdn Bhd	TV3
2013–2014	Plus One	Marissa	Joeza Rasidi	Main Actress	13	Primework Studios	TV9
2014	Arka Raja Haji	Puteri Hamidah	Datuk Paduka Shuhaimi Baba	Main Actress	8	Pesona Pictures	Astro Box Office
2014	Separuh Jiwaku	Hana	Bahri Umararif Bajuri	Main Actress	14	BZ2121 Production	TV9
2015	Kayuhan Cinta						TVi
2015	Setulus Janji						TV1
2016	Mr Secret Admirer	Zureen					Hppy TV
2017	Kerna Syurga Bukan Percuma	Solehah	Mohd Habibullah	Main Actress	24	Nuansa Sdn Bhd.	Astro Oasis
2020	Bila Cupid Jatuh Cinta	Keisha		Supporting Actress	10	Orangetree Production	TV3
2021	Di Sebalik Kasyaf	Diya	Erma Fatima	Main Actress	4	Rumah Karya Citra	TV3

=== Telemovie Drama ===
Year	Title	Role	Director	Notes	Production	TV Station
2008	Cinta Itu Buta	–		Issued		Astro Ceria
2010	Permata Hati	–		Supporting Actress		TV2
2010	Sabrina Vs Sazaly	–		Supporting Actress		TV3
2010	Kum Kum	Mariam	Michael Ang	Supporting Actress	Cube Film	Astro Ria
2011	Mahligai Itu Milikku	Aida	Heykal Hanifah	Supporting Actress	Suhan Movies Trading	TV9
2011	Lara Hati Seorang Ibu	–		Supporting Actress		Astro Oasis
2011	Sayaaang Abah	Intan	Michael Ang	Main Actress	Cube Film	Astro Prima
2011	Ekspress Dania	Dania	Michael Ang	Main Actress	Cube Film	Astro Ria
2011	Biar Mimpi Sampai Ke Bintang	Alya	Michael Ang	Main Actress	Cube Film	Astro Ria
2011	Hati Yang Terpinggir	Shazreen	Haizul Anafer Ali	Main Actress	–	TV1
2012	Cik Paris Diva Kampung	Mariam	Ghaz Abu Bakar	Main Actress	Mermaid Studios	Astro Ria
2013	Putih dan Putera Hodoh	Putih	Michael Ang	Main Actress	Cube Film	Astro Ceria
2013	Untuk Terakhir Kali	Aishah	Michael Ang	Main Actress	Cube Film	Astro Ria; Astro Maya HD
2013	Aku Bukan Malaikat	Adik	Eirma Fatima	Supporting Actress	Rumah Karya Citra	TV3
2013	Nak Jadi Menantu, Ye?	Rusnani	Khalid Sulaiman	Main Actress	Firdaus Maju Sdn Bhd	TVi; RTM
2014	Laikatong	Dian	Zul Huzaimy	Main Actress	Dark Wave Pictures	Astro Ria
2014	Biasan	Lehah	Murali Abdullah	Main Actress	–	TV3
2014	Di Sebalik Kasyafmu	Dhia	Eirma Fatima	Main Actress	Rumah Karya Citra	TV3
2014	Ketika Cinta Merintih	–	Eirma Fatima	–	Rumah Karya Citra	TV3
2014	Siti Aishah	Suraya	–	Main Actress	Outloud Studios	RTM
2015	Munajat Terhenti					TV2
2016	Cinta Viral	Solehah				TV1
2016	Umrah Dot Com	Zulaikha		Main Actress		Astro Ria
2016	Menantuku Rock	Salina		Main Actress		Astro Ria
2016	Oh My English!: Road to Jogja!	Jazlin				Astro TVIQ
2017	Permata Hati	Liz				Astro First Eksklusif
2017	Nak Jadi Menantu Ye?					TV1
2017	Encik Ustaz	Atikah				Hppy TV
2018	Cinta Tanpa Syarat	Zahirah				NTV7
2018	Striker Hati Ayah	Sofia				Astro Ria
2018	Cinta Untukku	Indah				TV Okey
2020	Rahsia Malam Jumaat	Hani				TV3

=== Program Host/ TV Shows ===
Year	Title	Role	Notes	TV
2010–2012	Disney Waktu Rehat	Amirah Aminuddin	Season 1, 2 and 3	Disney Channel Asia; Disney XD Malaysia; TV9; TV5; Astro Ceria
2009	Berani Jadi Bos	Self	Shows The Design	Astro Ceria
2009	Cuti-Cuti Famili	Self	Shows The Design	TV1
2009	Selamat Pagi Putera Puteri	Self	Shows The Design (season 1 and 2)	TV1
2009	Shana & Nina	Self	Shows The Design	TV3
2009	Kids and Cash	Self	Shows The Design	TV3
2012	Chictivity	Self	Shows The Design	Celebrate TV
2012	Rekativiti	Self	Shows The Design	Astro TVIQ
2012–2013	Fear Factor Selebriti Malaysia	Self	Player – Organize by Aaron Aziz	Astro Ria
2013	Kan Dah Kena	Self	Appearance with Ezlisa Loy; Eps 8	Astro Ceria
2013	FFM 25 – Red Carpet	Self	Co-host with Hefny Sahad	Astro; RTM
2013	Dinamik 2	Self	14 Eps	TV2
2013	Mbsb Over The Top	Self	Shows The Design (season 2 – Sri Pentas)	TV 3
2013	WHI Live	Self	Appearance	TV3
2013	Sembang Sahur	Self	Appearance	TV3
2013	Projek Gila	Self	Co-host with Siti Saleha; 8 Eps	TV9
2013	MeleTOP	Self	Appearance with Nabil, Neelofa dan Ajak Shiro	Astro Ria
2013	MeleTOP	Self	Appearance with Nabil, Neelofa dan Hanez Suraya	Astro Ria
2013	Propaganza	Self	Appearance with Marsha and Johan	Astro Ria; Astro Maya HD
2013	Hello Bro... Tolong Deko	Self	Appearance with Zoey Rahman and Dafi	Astro Ria; Astro Maya HD
2013	TGIAF	Self	Appearance with Zizan Razak and Hanis Zalikha	Astro Ria
2013	Destinasi Ria – Hong Kong	Self	The Loys	Astro Ria; Manggis TV
2013	Mad Markets	Self	Co-host with Akmal Nazri; Eps 6: Macau; Eps 7: Philippines; Eps 8: Philippines; Eps 9:Thailand (Chiangmai); Eps 10: Thailand (Lampang)	TV9
2013	Ceria Superstar	Self	Dance with Glamgirls	Astro Ceria
2014	Supper	Self	Appearance with Kaka Azraff	TV9
2014	WayangXtraVaganza	Self	Episode 1: Melayu Klasik; Episode 2: Parti With Abang Khai; Episode 3: Kaki Bola; Episode 4: Chef; Episode 5: Retro; Episode 6: Arabic; Episode 7: Rock; Episode 8: Cowboy; Episode 9: Kolar Putih; Episode 11: Hiphop Style; Episode 12: Idola; Episode 13: Red Carpet	RTM
2015	Tua Pun Boleh	Self	as a host with Zoey Rahman & Hafizul Kamal	Astro Prima
2016	Extreme Roadtrip	Self	as a host with Ardell Aryana & Sherry Alhadad	Astro Bella & Astro Mustika HD
2017	Ketuk - Ketuk Ramadan	Self	as a guest	TV1
2017	Ramadan 101	Self	as a host	TV9
2017	How Do I Look Asia Season 3	Self	as a guest	Diva Universal (Asia)

=== TV commercials ===
Year	Title	Role	Notes	TV Station
2011	Motosikal Honda	Self	Issued	TV3
2011	Sunway Lagoon	Self	Issued	TV2
2011	Mee Sedap	Self	Issued	TV3
2011	Institut Jantung Negara	Self	Issued	TV3
2011	Bank RHB	Self	Issued	TV3
2011	Mamee Slurp	Self	Issued	TV3
2012	The New Face of Maybelline New York (Malaysia)	Appearance Model	Issued	TV1; TV3
2013	Sofy Body Comfit	Self	Issued	TV3

=== Musical Theatre ===
Year	Title	Role	Notes
2006	Ali Baba: Bujang Lapok	Nursiah (Ali Baba's Wife)	Issued Live at Istana Budaya, Kuala Lumpur.
2006	Ibu Zain 1 & 2	Self	Issued
2012	Ali Baba	Marjina	Issued Live at Istana Budaya, Kuala Lumpur.

=== Voice Over ===
Year	Title	Role	Notes
2012	The Smurfs	Odile	Issued
2013	The Smurfs 2	Vexy	Issued

== Awards and nominations ==
Year	Awards	Category	Result
2010	Anugerah Bintang Popular Berita Harian 2010-Anugerah Bintang Popular Berita Harian	New Popular Female Actress	Nominated
2011	Anugerah Skrin 2011	Best Supporting Actress For Drama "(Kum Kum)"	Won
2011	Anugerah Bintang Popular Berita Harian 2011-Anugerah Bintang Popular Berita Harian	TV Popular Female Actress	Nominated
2011	Anugerah Bintang Popular Berita Harian 2011-Anugerah Bintang Popular Berita Harian	Most Popular Online Female Actress	Nominated
2012	Anugerah Stail EH!	People Choice of Selebriti	Nominated
