= Hada Labo =

Japanese skin care brand

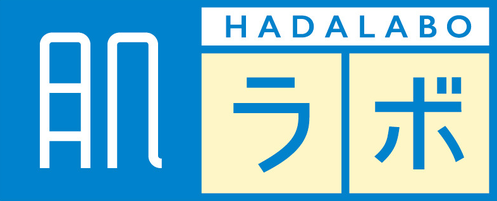
- Native name: 肌ラボ
- Romanized name: Hada Rabo
- Founded: 2004; 2015 (Hada Labo Tokyo)
- Headquarters: Tokyo, Japan
- Area served: Asia; United States (Hada Labo Tokyo)
- Products: Skin care
- Parent: Rohto Pharmaceutical
- Website: jp.rohto.com/hadalabo hadalabotokyo.com (Hada Labo Tokyo)

Hada Labo (肌ラボ, Hada Rabo; "Skin Lab") is a Japanese skin care brand developed by Rohto Pharmaceutical. The brand is most known for their hyaluronic acid products and for offering eco-friendly refill pouches. Their flagship offering, the Super Hyaluronic Acid Moisturizing Lotion, was the number one lotion in Japan for seven consecutive years.

Distinct from Hada Labo proper, Hada Labo Tokyo is manufactured by Mentholatum (a subsidiary of Rohto) for the American market, differing in branding, products and formulation.

== History ==
Hada Labo was launched in 2004, and sought to emphasize a more "simplistic" skin care approach by removing "unnecessary additives, colorant, fragrance and mineral oil".

In 2005, the brand changed their packaging from glass to plastic bottles and began offering their products in refill pouch variations. In 2015, Hada Labo Tokyo became the first Japanese cosmetics brand to launch at U.S. mass retailers. Six products from the brands lineup are to be distributed across the Northeastern and Florida markets in 235 Harmon locations. In November 2019, Hada Labo revised all the packaging from their Gokujyun and Shirojyun lines to be made from plant-derived materials.

== Products ==
Hada Labo is composed of three main lines:

- Gokujyun (極潤), focused on "intense" hydration
- Shirojyun (白潤), with added brightening properties
- Gokujyun Alpha (極潤α), with added anti-aging benefits

Their lotion products are a popular variant, a type of toner-adjacent skin conditioner unique to Japanese beauty.
