= Jaa Suzuran =

Malaysian actor (born 1994)

- Born: Mohamad Faizal bin Ahmad; 6 April 1994 (age 32); Kota Bharu, Kelantan, Malaysia
- Occupations: Radio presenter, Actor; Host Television; Gamers
- Years active: 2018–present
- Family: Raa Suzuran (younger sister); Eda Ezrin (sister-in-law)

Mohamad Faizal Ahmad (born 6 April 1994) known as Jaa Suzuran is an actor and radio presenter on Era FM. He first gained recognition when he acted in his first film, Autumn in Wales on the Astro channel.

== Filmography ==
=== Movie ===
Year	Title	Character	Note
2022	Autumn in Wales	Jake	First movie
2025	Soloz: Game of Life	Wow	

=== Telefilm ===
Year	Title	Character	TV Channel	Notes
2018	Korban Penunggu Hospital	Syakir	Astro Citra	First telefilm

=== Drama ===
Year	Title	Character	TV Channel	Notes
2021	Kisah Mr Cinderella	Razak	TV1	First drama
2022	Dongibab	Juno	eGG Network	

=== Television ===
Year	Title	Role	TV Channel	Notes
2023	Mic ON! Selebriti	Host	Awesome TV	hosted by Shiha Zikir

== Awards and nominations ==
Year	Award	Category	Nominated works	Results
2022	32nd Malaysian Film Festival	Promising Male Actor	Autumn in Wales	Won
2023	35th Berita Harian Popular Star Awards	Popular Film Actor	—N/a	Nominated
2023	35th Berita Harian Popular Star Awards	Popular Film Couple (with Eyka Farhana)	Autumn in Wales	Nominated
