= Zahirah MacWilson =

Malaysian actress

Zahirah Macwilson
- ظاهرة ميکويلسن
- Born: 1 February 1995 (age 31); Kuala Lumpur, Malaysia
- Education: Curtin University, Australia
- Occupations: Actress; Model
- Years active: 2015–present
- Height: 1.72 m (5 ft 8 in)
- Spouse: Aiman Hakim Ridza (m. 2020)
- Children: 2

Nur Zahirah Macwilson binti Zainol Macwilson (born 1 February 1995) is a Malaysian actress and model. She is of British and Malay descent.

== Personal life ==
In December 2018, she was reported to be in relationship with singer and actor Aiman Hakim Ridza while both were acting in Curi-Curi Cinta, and confirmed their relationship. Macwilson and Aiman became engaged on 8 June 2019 in Perth, Australia. They tied the knot on 20 February 2020.

On 8 January 2021, Macwilson and Aiman posted on their Instagram account that they had welcomed a baby boy on 5 January 2021 at 2:26pm in Perth, Australia.

On 5 March 2021, Macwilson and Aiman revealed their son's name, Isaac Raees, for the first time on their Instagram account.

On 31 May 2024, Macwilson and Aiman welcomed their second child, Inara Raisa.

== Filmography ==
=== Film ===
| Year | Title | Role | Note |
|---|---|---|---|
| 2016 | Saga Berterusan | Inspector Eva | Short film |
| 2016 | #ER3 Ertiga | Inspector Eva | Short film |
| 2020 | Bulan & Pria Terhebat | Bulan | |

=== Television series ===
| Year | Title | Role | TV Network |
|---|---|---|---|
| 2015 | Dunia Generasi Baru | Zahra | TV9 |
| 2015 | HidayahMu Ramadan | Dr. Katrina | TV3 |
| 2015 | Mencintaimu | Anissa | TV3 |
| 2015 | Cik Cinderella dan Encik Tengku | Puteri Nuraisha | TV3 |
| 2015 | Tanah Kubur (Season 14): "Tanah Kubur" | Sally | Astro Oasis |
| 2016 | Demi Cinta Ain | Mawar | TV3 |
| 2017 | Cucu Tauke Beras | Irsya Suhaila | TV3 |
| 2017 | Duda Pujaan Dara | Ainee Marwah | Astro Ria |
| 2018 | Mr. London Ms. Langkawi | Milah | Astro Warna |
| 2018 | Tak Ada Cinta Sepertimu | Athea Irdeena | Astro Ria |
| 2018 | Jangan Benci Cintaku | Rafeeqa Huda | TV3 |
| 2018 | Cinta Koko Coklat | Damia | ntv7 |
| 2019 | Curi-Curi Cinta | Intan Raihana | Astro Ria |
| 2019 | Rindu Yang Terlarang | Ainnura | Astro Ria |

=== Television movie ===
| Year | Title | Role | TV Network |
|---|---|---|---|
| 2015 | Lima Kali Cinta | | TV3 |
| 2015 | Husin Peninglah | Sara | TV9 |
| 2016 | Aisha & Projek Dapur Ramadan | Aisha | TV9 |
| 2016 | Cik Cinderella dan Encik Tengku Raya | Puteri Nuraisha | TV3 |
| 2016 | Cik Oxford Mr Mesir | Iris | Astro Ria |
| 2016 | DORM | Izara | Astro Ria |
| 2016 | Oh Speak English Please | Sally | Astro Ria |
| 2016 | Aku Kata A, A! | Aida | TV3 |
| 2017 | Miss Ustazah | Cikgu Nabilah | TV1 |
| 2017 | Ghazal Yang Hilang | Zahra | TV1 |
| 2018 | Mentari | Mentari | TV3 |
| 2018 | Secarik Kasih Mama | Rozie | TV Okey |
