= Daiyan Trisha =

Malaysian singer and actress (born 1993)

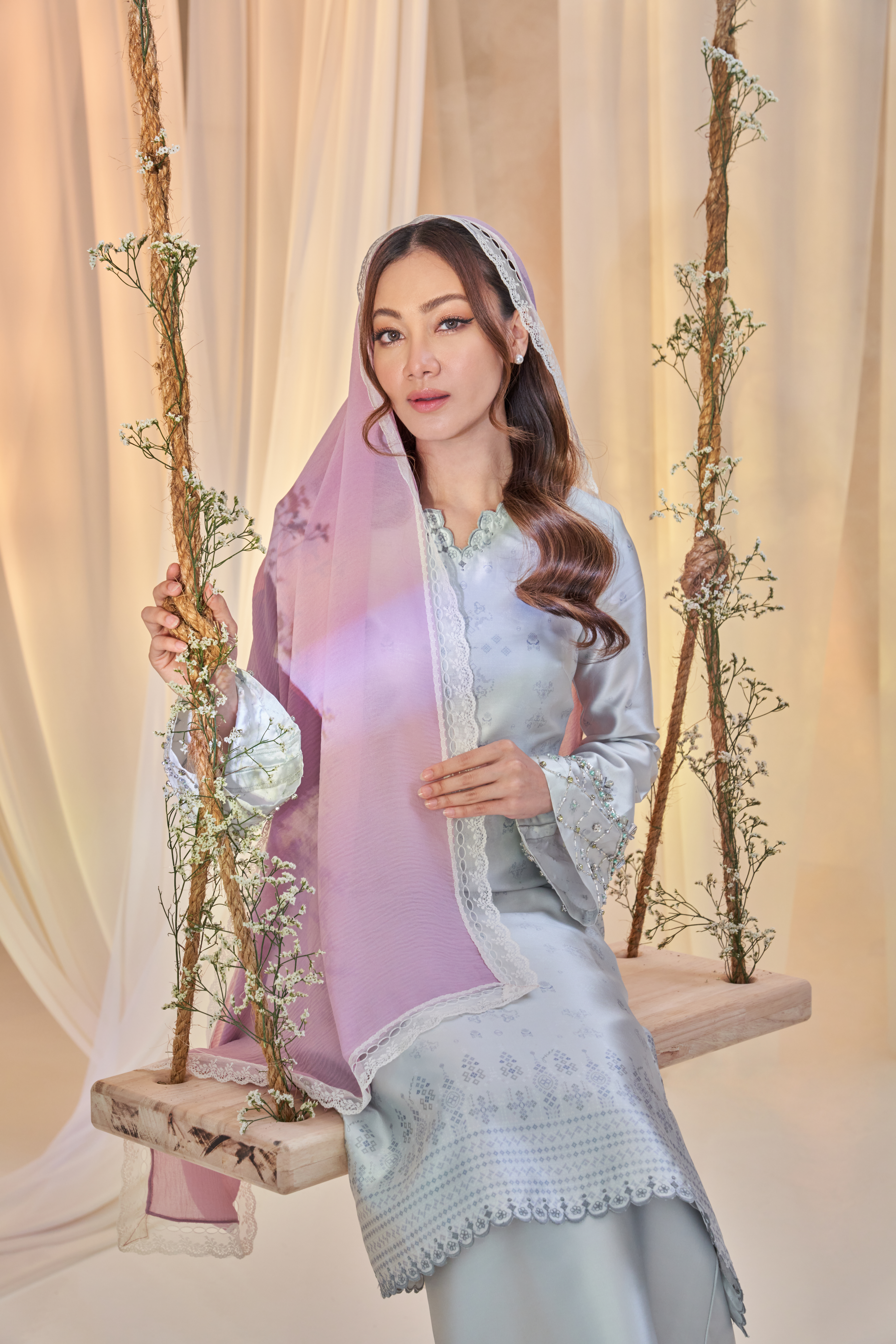
- Daiyan in 2015
- Born: Daiyan Trisha binti Mohd Nasaruddin; December 22, 1993 (age 32); Bangi, Selangor, Malaysia
- Education: Diploma in Accounting Bachelor of Business Administration
- Alma mater: Universiti Teknologi MARA (UiTM); Kuala Lumpur Infrastructure University College (IUKL)
- Occupations: Singer, songwriter, actress
- Years active: 2013–present
- Height: 1.59 m (5 ft 2 1/2 in)
- Musical career
- Genres: Pop; R&B; ballad
- Instrument: Vocals
- Website: www.daiyantrisha.com; tulisanbydaiyan.com

Daiyan Trisha Mohd Nasaruddin (born 22 December 1993) is a Malaysian singer, songwriter, model and actress. She first gained attention through her first telefilm titled Dee, and has acted in appeared in acting roles on television and film including in Sejuta Rasa Buat Adelia (2018), and in Busker (2018).

Daiyan has recorded a number of commercially successful songs including "Cinta Suka Sayang Kamu", "Kita Manusia" and "If I". She is also known for her ballad single "Penat", her role as Aaida in Projek: Anchor SPM and Mia in Projek: High Council. Daiyan is an ambassador for various brands, including Samsung. In 2023, she published her own book titled Writings.

== Early life ==
Trisha was born on 22 December 1993 in Bangi, Selangor. She is the second of five children to Samsiah Mohd Nor, a well known novelist, and Mohd Nasaruddin Mohamed. Daiyan worked as a restaurant waiter while waiting for her Sijil Pelajaran Malaysia (SPM) results. Daiyan holds a Diploma in Accounting from Universiti Teknologi MARA (UiTM) and a Bachelor of Business Administration from Kuala Lumpur University of Science & Technology (IUKL).

== Career ==
Daiyan began uploading video clips of herself singing cover songs on YouTube at the age of 16. She came to public attention through a 2013 telefilm – which was then expanded into a 2015 TV series – titled Dee, which was broadcast by Astro Ceria. In 2013, she also started a music career by releasing the single "Kerana Kau" (2013), which was later followed by a second single, "Cinta Suka Sayang Kamu" (2014), a duet with the winner of Akademi Fantasia season 10, Faizul Sany.

In 2015, she was appointed as the brand ambassador for the beauty product Fair & Lovely. In the same year, she and Marsha Milan posed as Disney Princesses in a calendar photoshoot.

Her film career began with the comedy-drama film Girlfriend Kontrak (2015), directed by Australian director Virginia Kennedy starring Risteena Munim and Keith Foo. She also duetted with Indonesian singer, Calvin Jeremy in the song "Kita".

In 2017, she released two singles simultaneously, "Boy In My Dream" and "Kita Manusia". From November of the same year until January 2018, Daiyan acted in the supporting role as Ira in the drama My Coffee Prince directed by Michael Ang, which was adapted from the South Korean 2007 drama, The 1st Shop of Coffee Prince.

In 2018, her second film, Busker, which paired her with Hafeez Mikail was released, in which Daiyan plays the role of Vera. She received a nomination for the Promising Actress category at the 30th Malaysian Film Festival for her performance in this film.

Daiyan starred alongside Aliff Aziz in the drama Sejuta Rasa Buat Adelia, which was adapted from the novel Ulam Kasih Sambal Cinta by Norzailina Nordin. She plays the role of Adelia Naurah, a chef at Malay Kitchen. She then released the song "Brutal" whose music video was filmed in Los Angeles, California, U.S.

In August 2018, Daiyan Trisha and young composer, Nik Qistina collaborated with HP Malaysia to produce a song and music video that focuses on self-expression among teenagers. She sang the theme song for the Disney Channel TV series, Wizards of Warna Walk titled "There's Magic Here".

In 2019, Daiyan released the song "I Wanna See Ya" in a collaboration between Daiyan and Juan Ariza. She embarked on a Southeast Asia concert tour with American-born entertainer Sam Tsui at the end of 2019. In November 2019, Daiyan released her first self-titled studio album. In July 2020, she released the single, "On My Way".

Later in October 2020, Daiyan released the song "Cahaya", to celebrate the 10th anniversary of Japanese skincare brand, Hada Labo.

Daiyan hosted the show Renovate which aired on Naura HD and appeared in the educational drama Projek: Anchor SPM which revolves around students who sat for the Sijil Pelajaran Malaysia (SPM) examination around 2000. In March 2021, Daiyan along with Alif Satar became the new hosts of Muzik Muzik.

In 2021, Daiyan released the song, "Penat", which she wrote herself. She acted with Aiman Hakim Ridza in Semanis Senyumanmu playing the role of Azra.

Daiyan became the main actor alongside Rashidi Ishak and Ben Amir in the drama Tetuan Ang & Rahimin which was broadcast on Astro Ria by playing the character of Budi, and then acted alongside Zizan Razak in the telefilm Rompak by playing the character of Nadia. In 2023, she played the role of Mia in Projek: High Council. Daiyan then appeared in the film Sumpahan Jerunei which was released on 27 July 2023.

In 2023, Daiyan released her book titled Written by Daiyan Trisha, published by Nukilan Biruni Publication that contains over 222 poems written in Malay. She starred alongside Hun Haqeem in the drama W: Two Worlds which premiered on the streaming platform, Viu starting November 30, 2023. She plays the role of Izara, a doctor and the daughter of a comic artist.

On 7 June 2024, Daiyan appeared with her latest single, "My Home Is In Your Arms" which was fully composed by her.

Daiyan's second album, Lovelorn was released on 4 October 2024 under Celeste Studio. This album contains 11 songs of his own creation, one of which is a song he wrote in 2019. In addition, he also appeared with his performance at Daiyan Trisha Live in Surround Sound on 1 and 2 November at Aurum Theatre TRX Kuala Lumpur.

In March 2025, Daiyan released her first Raya single, "Jom Raya", which has two versions, namely a solo version and a duet version with Alfie Zumi.

== Filmography ==
=== Movies ===
Year	Title	Characters	Notes
2015	Girlfriend Kontrak	Sarah	First film
2018	Busker	Vera	
2022	Rompak	Nadia	
2023	Sumpahan Jerunei	Hana	
2023	War on Terror: KL Anarchy	Maria	
TBA	Wantugo	Emylia	

=== Drama ===
Year	Title	Characters	TV Channel	Note
2014	Geng Kampung Pisang 2	Monalisa	TV3	The first drama
2015	Dee The Series	Dee	Cheerful Astro	
2015	Geng UPSR	Sister Zulaika	Astro Tutor TV	
2017–2018	My Coffee Prince	Ira	Astro Ria	
2018	Sejuta Rasa Buat Adelia	Adelia Naurah	Astro Ria	
2021	Project: Anchor SPM	Aaidaa	Astro Citra	
2021	Semanis Senyumanmu	Azra	TV3; Disney+ Hotstar	
2022	Tetuan Ang & Rahimin	Budi	Astro Ria	
2023	Project: High Council	Mia	Astro Ria	

=== Web drama ===
Year	Title	Character	Network	Notes
2023–2024	W: Two Worlds	Dr Izara	Viu	First drama

=== Telefilm ===
Year	Title	Character	TV channel	Notes
2013	Dee	Dee	Astro Ceria	First telefilm
2015	Aku Mahu ke New York 1	Fasha	Astro Ceria	
2015	Aku Mahu ke New York 2	Fasha	Astro Ceria	
2018	Syawal Mencari Cinta	Tasya/ Cinta	NTV7	
2023	Bro Jenin	Emily	Astro Ria	

=== Television ===
Year	Title	Role	TV Channel	Notes
2020	Renovate	Host	Naura HD	
2021	Betul Ke Bohong Kuasa 2?	Guest Artist	Astro Warna	Episode 3
2021	Muzik Muzik	Host	TV3	with Alif Satar
2022	Sepahtu Reunion Live 2022	Nadia	Astro Warna	Guest Artist: Episode "Seteguh Tiang Gol"
2023	Sepahtu Reunion Al-Raya	Marlia	Astro Warna	Guest Artist: Episode "Lara Di Hati Ayah"
2024	The Masked Singer Malaysia (season 4)	Participants	Astro Warna	As a Ikan Emas

=== Ads ===
Year	Title
2021	Astro GO
2021	Disney+ Hotstar

== Discography ==
=== Studio album ===
Title	Album details
Daiyan Trisha	Released: 13 November 2019; Label: Independent; Format: CD, digital download
"Lovelorn"	Released: 4 October 2024; Label: Celeste Studio; Format: Digital download

=== Single ===
Year	Title	Collaboration	Lyricist	Composer	Note
2013	Kerana Kau	—	Daiyan Trisha	AG Coco	OST Telefilm Dee
2014	Cinta Suka Sayang Kamu	Faizul Sany	Omar K		OST Telefilm Strawberry Karipap Sesat Kat Paris
2015	Jatuh	—	Daiyan Trisha		
2016	Kau Tahu	—	Daiyan Trisha	Omar K, Faizal Tahir & Mike Chan	OST Drama Sejuta Rasa Buat Adelia
2016	Stargazing	—	Daiyan Trisha		
2016	Kita	Calvin Jeremy			
2017	Boy In My Dream	—	Daiyan Trisha		
2017	Kita Manusia	—	Daiyan Trisha	Daiyan Trisha & Omar K	
2018	Ingat	—			OST Busker Movie
2018	Brutal	—	Daiyan Trisha & Audi Mok		
2018	Langit	—	Daiyan Trisyha, Omar K & Ikhwan Fatanna		
2019	If I	—	Daiyan Trisha & Kuizz		
2019	Passin' Thru	MFMF	Daiyan Trisha, Kuizz, Justin Seow, Wee Zhen Yong		
2019	There's Magic Here	—			OST Drama Wizards of Warna Walk
2019	I Wanna See Ya	—	Daiyan Trisha & Juan Ariza		
2020	LDR	Naim Daniel			
2020	On My Way	—			
2020	Cahaya	—	MFMF, Bil Musa & Harith Zazman	MFMF	
2021	Penat	Tuju K-Clique	Daiyan Trisha, Tuju K-Clique & Loca B	Daiyan Trisha & Tuju K-Clique	
2024	My Home Is In Your Arms	—	Daiyan Trisha		
2024	Pergilah	—	Daiyan Trisha		OST Drama Project: Exit

== Awards and nominations ==
Year	Award	Category	Recipient/Nominated work	Results
2016	Anugerah Planet Muzik	Best Local English Song	"Stargazing"	Nominated
2017	Anugerah Planet Muzik	Best Collaboration - Artist (with Calvin Jeremy)	"Kita"	Nominated
2019	Malaysian Film Festival	Best Female Actress	"Busker"	Nominated
2022	Anugerah Industri Muzik	Best Pop Song	"Penat"	Nominated
2022	Anugerah Industri Muzik	Best Music Video	"Penat"	Nominated
2023	35th Daily Star Popular Awards	Best Movie Couple (with Zizan Razak)	"Rompak"	Nominated
