= Anugerah Juara Lagu =

Malaysian annual music competition

- Anugerah Juara Lagu Logo
- Awarded for: the best musical and lyric compositions of Malay-language songs
- Country: Malaysia
- Presented by: TV3
- First award: 1986

Television/radio coverage
- Runtime: 3 Hours
- Related: Muzik Muzik

Anugerah Juara Lagu (literally: "Song Championship Award"), commonly known by the acronym AJL, is a popular annual music competition in Malaysia, organised by TV3 since 1986. It features the best musical and lyrical compositions of each year it is held. Nominees are derived from a list of mostly Malay-language songs which have garnered the most public votes in Muzik Muzik throughout the year, and then progress into the semifinals, from which twelve songs will be nominated by a panel of judges to become the winner of Juara Lagu.

AJL honours the composers and lyricists of the songs rather than the performing artistes.

== History and background ==
Originally, Juara Lagu was introduced as a show that had a simple publication format that was easy to understand and follow for the audience. Anugerah Juara Lagu began in 1986 and has captivated many audiences over the years. Datuk Ahmad Merican who was then the Program Manager of TV3 was the pioneer of the Muzik Muzik show which started airing on Sunday, 2 March 1986 at 8.30 pm. From the songs nominated in the Musics that will be taken and screened to the next level.

In the early years of the Juara Lagu, final contestants were screened from the monthly champions. In the early stages of the organization, the public also made nominations and elections through local daily newspapers. Until 1991, each monthly champion was eligible to be screened for the finals. Beginning in 1992, the Juara Lagu format was changed by introducing categories with the aim of encouraging participation from genres such as traditional rhythms and ballads as rock genres were much dominant at that time.

Regular changes have been made to the format of the plan to the weekly chart system. Chart 20 is introduced as used by Music Music now. This chart format gives the opportunity for new songs to enter the chart on a weekly basis. The songs that are successfully screened will be taken to the semi-finals to select 12 songs that will be competed to the finals to be crowned as the "Juara Lagu".

In 2009, competitions by category were abolished due to a critical lack of entries from traditional rhythmic songs and creative ethnicities.

Anugerah Juara Lagu are held either at the end of the year or at the beginning of the following year. The location of AJL, which is a venue for artists and composers to compete for talent, was once held at the San Choo Hall at Wisma MCA, Angkasapuri RTM Auditorium, Sri Pentas Dua, Shah Alam City Hall, Merdeka Hall, PWTC, Malawati Stadium Shah Alam, Axiata Arena and Putra Stadium Bukit Jalil.

Juara Lagu has also invited local and international professional judges, especially from the Malay region such as Singapore, Indonesia, the Philippines and Japan to judge the finals. The evaluation focuses on the melodies, lyrics and performances of the artist.

- 1986 – "First Juara Lagu organized"
- 1988 – "Juara Lagu aired in several Asian countries through television collaborations (Japan, Indonesia and the Philippines)"
- 1992 – "Genre category segregation system introduced without Best Performance award. Open category abolished"
- 1993 – "Rebranding of categories from Pop kreatif to Ballad, Rock to Pop Rock; while re -composing classic song entries are abolished"
- 1994 – "First time Juara lagu held without musicians; invited jury"
- 1995 – "Public jury involvement from 4 locations across the country"
- 1996 – "Modern version of the Song Champion Trophy introduced; used to this day. Accompanying musicians featured again"
- 1997 – "A modern version of the Juara Lagu logo is introduced, used to this day"
- 1998 – "Song Champions are held without musicians, without major sponsors and broadcast from studios due to the economic downturn"
- 1999 – "Music montage Muzik Muzik/Juara Lagu introduced all; AJL's first collaboration with music director Ramli MS"
- 2000 – "AJL begins broadcasting via digital (streaming) and radio platforms"
- 2001 – "Short message system (SMS) voting system is introduced for public judging of 70%. Song Champions are held without musicians"
- 2002 – "Juara Lagu branded as Anugerah Juara Lagu"
- 2004 – "Song Champion Award begins airing from Putra Stadium (Axiata Arena)"
- 2007 – "Entry quota by category modified to include more songs from popular genres"
- 2008 – "The first entry of the song by Wildcard -" Dingin "(Azlan Abu Hassan)"
- 2009 – "Open category reintroduced after genre segregation was abolished"
- 2011 – "Anugerah Juara Lagu creates the highest live viewing record in the history of television entertainment broadcasts at 6.5 million viewers"
- 2016 – "Online voting introduced for public judging, replacing short messaging system (SMS)"
- 2019 – "Two participant performances are banned from digital screenings after live appearances featured unauthorized elements"
- 2020 – "Anugerah Juara Lagu took place during the Movement and Emergency Control Order 2021; held for the first time without audiences in the event hall. A certificate of commitment of participants to follow standardized performance conditions was introduced"

== Organizing list ==
Year/Edition	Date	Place	Executive Publisher / Publisher	Emcee and event assistants	Music director	Chief Jury	Main sponsor	Views (Rating)
AJL1 1986	30 December 1986 (Tuesday)	Dewan Merdeka, Putra World Trade Center, Kuala Lumpur	• Frank Tian	• Zainal Abas • Habibah Yusof	Ooi Eow Jin	Johari Salleh	Dynamo (Colgate-Palmolive), Mesiniaga	
AJL2 1987	20 December 1987 (Sunday)	Angkasapuri Premier Auditorium, Bangsar, Kuala Lumpur		• Karim Muhammad • Noorkumalasari	Ooi Eow Jin	Johari Salleh	Player's Gold Leaf	
AJL3 1988	23 December 1988 (Friday)	Dewan Merdeka, Putra World Trade Center, Kuala Lumpur	• Mokhtar Abu Bakar	• ND Lala • Charmaine Agustine	Ooi Eow Jin	Johari Salleh	Matsushita (National/Panasonic)	
AJL4 1989	30 December 1989 (Saturday)	Dewan Merdeka, Putra World Trade Center, Kuala Lumpur	• Mohd Asri Zulkifli • Frank Tian	• Azwan Ali • Charmaine Agustine	Ooi Eow Jin	Johari Salleh	Matsushita (National/Panasonic)	
AJL5 1990	30 December 1990 (Sunday)	Dewan Merdeka, Putra World Trade Center, Kuala Lumpur	• Tan Guat Eyu	• Azwan Ali • Charmaine Agustine	Ooi Eow Jin	Ahmad Merican |	Sharp	
AJL6 1991	29 December 1991 (Sunday)	Dewan Merdeka, Putra World Trade Center, Kuala Lumpur	• Mokhtar Abu Bakar	• Azwan Ali • Melissa Saila • Intan Rozila	Ooi Eow Jin	Ahmad Merican |	Sharp	
AJL7 1992	20 December 1992 (Sunday)	San Choo Hall, Wisma MCA, Kuala Lumpur	• Nik Ramzi Nik Hassan	• Azwan Ali assisted by: • Haleeda Mazlin• Rina Khan• Wohnen	Ooi Eow Jin	Ahmad Merican |	Matsushita (National/Panasonic)	
AJL8 1993	19 December 1993 (Sunday)	Dewan Merdeka, Putra World Trade Center, Kuala Lumpur	• Mohd Asri Zulkifli	• Azwan Ali • Fauziah Ahmad Daud • Aznil Nawawi	Purnama Booty	Ahmad Nawab	Bioré (Kao Corporation)	
AJL9 1994	16 December 1994 (Friday)	Dewan Merdeka, Putra World Trade Center, Kuala Lumpur	• Nik Ramzi Nik Hassan	• Azwan Ali • Salih Yaacob • Sharifah Haslinda assisted by: • Jayamani Kandasamy• Mazlan Pet Pet• Shamsul Ghau Ghau	Minus One (No Orchestra)	Wah Idris		
AJL10 1995	December 1995	Dewan Merdeka, Putra World Trade Center, Kuala Lumpur	• Tan Guat Eyu	• Azwan Ali • Fauziah Ahmad Daud assisted by:• Shamsul Ghau Ghau (Audience Host)• Iwan Dasri (Backstage Host)• Maya Ruslee (Location Host)• Mamat (Location Host)• Azie (Location Host)• Shajiry Dameri (Host Location)	Minus One (No Orchestra)	Ooi Eow Jin	Telekom Malaysia	
AJL11 1996	28 December 1996 (Saturday)	Dewan Merdeka, Putra World Trade Center, Kuala Lumpur	• Azwan Ali	• Salih Yaacob • Fauziah Ahmad Daud	Anuar Dahalan	Ooi Eow Jin	Malakoff	
AJL12 1997	27 December 1997 (Saturday)	Dewan Merdeka, Putra World Trade Center, Kuala Lumpur	• Khalid Ahmad • Rasidah Karim	• Shamsul Ghau Ghau • Anne Hamid	Aznul Haidi	Ooi Eow Jin	MIMOS (MSC Malaysia)	
AJL13 1998	6 December 1998 (Sunday)	Sri Pentas 2, Plaza Alam Sentral, Shah Alam	• Kamarul Zamli Ramly	• Shamsul Ghau Ghau • Anne Hamid	Minus One (No Orchestra)	Ooi Eow Jin	-	2.5 million
AJL14 1999	5 December 1999 (Sunday)	MBSA Auditorium, Shah Alam	• Khalijah Mohammed	• Kelvin Ong • Normala Samsuddin	Aznul Haidi	Wah Idris	KFC	3.8 million
AJL15 2000	19 November 2000 (Sunday)	MBSA Auditorium, Shah Alam	• Hemanathan Paul • Ismadi Ismail	• Aidiel Abdul Ghaffar • Zalina Azman assisted by:• Intan Suraya	Ramli MS	Johari Salleh	MIMOS	
AJL16 2001	30 December 2001 (Sunday)	MBSA Auditorium, Shah Alam	• Muhammad Sufian Isa • Micheal Christian Simon	• Aidiel Abdul Ghaffar • Zalina Azman	Minus One (No Orchestra)	Johari Salleh	TIME	
AJL17 2002	12 January 2003 (Sunday)	Dewan Merdeka, Putra World Trade Center, Kuala Lumpur	• Ismadi Ismail	• Ary Malik • Intan Suraya	Ramli MS	Johari Salleh	TIME	
AJL18 2003	28 December 2003 (Sunday)	Putra Stadium Bukit Jalil, Kuala Lumpur	• Kama Azman	• Aznil Nawawi • Sarimah Ibrahim	Ramli MS	Ooi Eow Jin	TIME	
AJL19 2004	16 January 2005 (Sunday)	Putra Stadium Bukit Jalil, Kuala Lumpur	• Rasidah Karim • Muhamad Sufian Isa	• Najip Ali • Sarimah Ibrahim assisted by:• Cheryl Samad	Ramli MS	Farihin Abdul Fatah	L'oreal Paris	
AJL20 2005	5 February 2006 (Sunday)	Putra Stadium Bukit Jalil, Kuala Lumpur	• Nurhul Huda Khalid	• Cheryl Samad • Ally Iskandar • Farah Fauzana • Amy Mastura • Ezlynn	Ramli MS	Farihin Abdul Fatah	L'oreal Paris	
AJL21 2006	21 January 2007 (Sunday)	Putra Stadium Bukit Jalil, Kuala Lumpur	• Tengku Sahilawaty Tengku Jehori	• Cheryl Samad • Ally Iskandar • Farah Fauzana	Ramli MS	Azhar Borhan	L'oreal Paris	
AJL22 2007	27 January 2008 (Sunday)	Putra Stadium Bukit Jalil, Kuala Lumpur	• Tengku Sahilawaty Tengku Jehori	• Cheryl Samad • Ally Iskandar • Farah Fauzana • Faizal Ismail	Ramli MS	Azhar Borhan	L'oreal Paris	4.7 million
AJL23 2008	18 January 2009 (Sunday)	Putra Stadium Bukit Jalil, Kuala Lumpur	• Roslina Abdul Rahman	• Cheryl Samad • Ally Iskandar • Faizal Ismail	Ramli MS	Azhar Abu Bakr (Azmeer)	STAGE Cosmetics	4.7 million
AJL24 2009	10 January 2010 (Sunday)	Putra Stadium Bukit Jalil, Kuala Lumpur	• Ahmad Shaifullizam Arshad	• Cheryl Samad • Ally Iskandar • Faizal Ismail	Ramli MS	Fauzi Marzuki	Maxis (Hotlink)	5.0 million
AJL25 2010	9 January 2011 (Sunday)	Putra Stadium Bukit Jalil, Kuala Lumpur	• Ahmad Shaifullizam Arshad	• Cheryl Samad • Ally Iskandar • Faizal Ismail	Ramli MS	M. Nasir	Maxis (Hotlink)	4.2 million
AJL26 2011	29 January 2012 (Sunday)	Putra Stadium Bukit Jalil, Kuala Lumpur	• Nurhul Huda Khalid	• Cheryl Samad • Faizal Ismail	Ramli MS	Azhar Abu Bakar (Azmeer)	Celcom (X-Pax)	6.5 million
AJL27 2012	6 January 2013 (Sunday)	Putra Stadium Bukit Jalil, Kuala Lumpur	• Hamsiah Biri • Tengku Sahilawaty Tengku Jehori	• Cheryl Samad • Faizal Ismail	Ramli MS	Azhar Abu Bakar (Azmeer)	Celcom (X-Pax)	6.0 million
AJL28 2013	26 January 2014 (Sunday)	Putra Stadium Bukit Jalil, Kuala Lumpur	• Azman Abdul Ghaffar • Zaini Saidi	• AG Selamat • Scha Al-Yahya assisted by:Hunny Madu (Backstage Host)	Ramli MS	Azhar Abu Bakar (Azmeer)	Celcom (X-Pax)	6.0 million
AJL29 2014	18 January 2015 (Sunday)	Putra Stadium Bukit Jalil, Kuala Lumpur	• Nurhul Huda Khalid	• AG Selamat • Scha Al-Yahya assisted by:Juliana Evans (Backstage Host)	Ramli MS	Azhar Abu Bakar (Azmeer)	Vida Beauty (Pamoga QuPuteh)	6.0 million
AJL30 2015	24 January 2016 (Sunday)	Malawati Stadium, Shah Alam	• Nurhul Huda Khalid	• AG Selamat • Farah Fauzana assisted by:Juliana Evans (Backstage Host)	Ramli MS	Azhar Abu Bakar (Azmeer)	Vida Beauty (Pamoga QuPuteh)	6.2 million
AJL31 2016	22 January 2017 (Sunday)	Dewan Merdeka, Putra World Trade Center, Kuala Lumpur	• Nurhul Huda Khalid	• Farah Fauzana • Fizie Hot FM • Awal Ashaari • Sarimah Ibrahim assisted by:Hefny Sahad (Location Host)Liza Khairuddin (Location Host)Liza Abdullah (invited host)	Ramli MS	Azhar Abu Bakar (Azmeer)	Honda, Samsung Galaxy & CJ Wow Shop	6.0 million ^{[1]}
AJL32 2017	11 February 2018 (Sunday)	Axiata Arena, Bukit Jalil, Kuala Lumpur	• Nurhul Huda Khalid	• Alif Satar • Sherry Alhadad assisted by:Zulin Aziz	Aubrey Suwito	Azhar Abu Bakar (Azmeer)	Nivea, Samsung	6.1 million
AJL 33 2018	3 February 2019 (Sunday)	Axiata Arena, Bukit Jalil, Kuala Lumpur	• Hamsiah Biri	• Alif Satar • Sherry Alhadad assisted by:Haziq Hussni (Backstage Segment), Nabila Razali and Ismail Izzani (Sponsored Segment)	Aubrey Suwito	Azhar Abu Bakar (Azmeer)	Samsung Galaxy, KFC	6.2 million
AJL 34 2019	9 February 2020 (Sunday)	Axiata Arena, Bukit Jalil, Kuala Lumpur	* Nurhul Huda Khalid (Executive) * Roslina Abdul Rahman (Publisher)	• Haziq Hussni • Sherry Alhadad • Awal Ashaari assisted by: Hefny Sahad, Ain Edruce (Backstage Segment), Shuk Sahar and Sean Lee (Stage Segment)	Aubrey Suwito	Ajai	McDonald's, Celcom & Setel	6 million
AJL 35 2020	14 March 2021 (Sunday)	MBSA Auditorium, Shah Alam	* Nurhul Huda Khalid (Executive) * Aeizul Reeza Ismail (Publisher)	• Haziq Hussni • Sherry Alhadad • Awal Ashaari assisted by: Hefny Sahad, Neeta Manishaa (Backstage Segment)Muaz Mohamed and Sissy Imann (Lounge Segment)	Aubrey Suwito	Mokhzani Ismail	McDonald's, Celcom (X Pax), & Sabella	
AJL 36 2021	6 March 2022 (Sunday)	Dewan Merdeka, Putra World Trade Center, Kuala Lumpur		• Alif Satar • Nabila Huda Sean Lee and Sissy Imann (Lounge Segment)			Oppo	
AJL 37 2022	12 February 2023 (Sunday)	Arena Axiata, Kuala Lumpur		• Sherry Alhadad • Jihan Muse Fiza Frizzy and Muaz Mohamed (Lounge Segment)			Alha Alfa Cosmetics	

== Judging ==
The competition started from the weekly popular voting stage in the Muzik Muzik program where voting was made by the audience through newspaper forms (1986–2002) and online voting (2003–present). The accumulated scores will determine the 30 songs that will compete in the Semi Final commemorations. At this stage the songs that will advance to the finals will be judged by a professional jury appointed from the composer and music director.

Anugerah Juara Lagu uses a professional judging method where a group of music artists from various backgrounds are gathered to evaluate the quality of the song that advanced to the finals to be crowned the champion song, runner-up, third place and category champion (1992–2008). On awards night, the scoring of the vocal performance and the stage performance will be combined to determine the championship. Vocal scoring is 100% in the hands of the jury, while the stage performance is determined either through fan votes (press, telephone, SMS, online) or combined/determined by a professional jury.

== List of overall winners of the Song Champion Award ==
* For a full list of entries, please see Songs That Have Competed in the Song Champion Awards

1986 : Title : "Sekadar di Pinggiran"; Artist : Francissca Peter; Composer : Manan Ngah; Lyrics : Lukhman S. (Lukhman Abdul Kadir); Album : Sekadar Di Pinggiran (1986); 1987 : Title : "Menaruh Harapan"; Artist : Zaiton Sameon; Composer : A. Ali; Lyrics : Habsah Hassan; Album : Menaruh Harapan (1987); 1988 : Title : "Kau Kunci Cintaku Dalam Hatimu"; Artist : Ramlah Ram; Composer : Ahmad Nawab; Lyrics : Wielid (Abdul Jalil Salleh); Album : Kau Kunci Cintaku (Dalam Hatimu) (1988); 1989 : Title : "Isabella"; Artist : Search Band; Composer : Search Band; Lyrics : Bob Lokman; Album : Fenomena (1989); 1990 : Title : "Janji Manismu"; Artist : Aishah; Composer : Adam Ahmad; Lyrics : Aishah; Album : Aishah (1990); 1991 : Title : "Takdir dan Waktu"; Artist : Mega Band; Composer : Rahim Othman; Lyrics : Juwie (Abdul Jalil Salleh); Album : Ilustrasi (1991); 1992 : Title : "Pada Syurga di Wajahmu"; Artist : Nash; Composer : Fauzi Marzuki; Lyrics : Bob Lokman; Album : Nash (1992); 1993 : Title : "Teratai Layu di Tasik Madu"; Artist : Fauziah Latiff; Composer : Adam Ahmad; Lyrics : S. Amin Shahab; Album : Epilog Memori Gelita (1993); 1994 : Title : "Tanya Sama Itu Hud-hud"; Artist : M. Nasir; Composer : M. Nasir; Lyrics : M. Nasir; Album : Canggung Mendonan (1994); 1995 : Title : "Cinta Beralih Arah"; Artist : Aishah; Composer : Jari Idris; Lyrics : Habsah Hassan; Album : Wajah (1995); 1996 : Title : "Jerat Percintaan"; Artist : Siti Nurhaliza; Composer : Adnan Abu Hassan; Lyrics : Othman Zainuddin & Hani M. J.; Album : Siti Nurhaliza (1996); 1997 : Title : "Ghazal Untuk Rabiah"; Artist : Jamal Abdillah and M. Nasir; Composer: M. Nasir and Jamal Abdillah; Lyrics : Cenderawasih (Rosli Khamis); Album : Suratan Kasih (Repacked) (1995); 1998 : Title : "Cindai"; Artist : Siti Nurhaliza; Composer : Pak Ngah (Suhaimi Mohd Zain); Lyrics : Hairul Anuar Harun; Album : Cindai (1997); 1999 : Title : "Andalusia"; Artist : M. Nasir; Composer : M. Nasir; Lyrics : Loloq (Rosli Khamis); Album : Terbaik M. Nasir (1998); 2000 : Title : "Balqis"; Artist : Siti Nurhaliza; Composer : Pak Ngah (Suhaimi Mohd Zain); Lyrics : Hairul Anuar Harun; Album : Sahmura (2000)	2001 : Title : "Mimpi Laila"; Artist : Yasin Sulaiman; Composer : Yasin Sulaiman; Lyrics : Yasin Sulaiman; Album : Mimpi Laila (2001); 2002 : Title : "Keliru"; Artist : Ajai & Nurul; Composer : Aidit Alfian; Lyrics : Aidit Alfian; Album : Ajai & Nurul (2002); 2003 : Title : "Bunga-bunga Cinta"; Artist : Misha Omar; Composer : Adnan Abu Hassan; Lyrics : Adnan Abu Hassan; Album : Misha (2002); 2004 : Title : "Relaku Pujuk"; Artist : Spider Band; Composer : Tam (Rustam Mustafah); Lyrics : Mohd Khirin Omar (Keon); Album : Nazraku (2004) † C † K; 2005 : Title : "Gemilang"; Artist : Jaclyn Victor; Composer : Aubrey Suwito; Lyrics : Asmin Mudin; Album : Gemilang (2004); 2006 : Title : "Terlalu Istimewa"; Artist : Adibah Noor; Composer : Azlan Abu Hassan; Lyrics : Adibah Noor; Album : Terlalu Istimewa (2005); 2007 : Title : "Itu Kamu"; Artist : Estranged; Composer : Estranged; Lyrics : Richael Lawrence; Album : In Hating Memory (Repacked) (2007); 2008 : Title : "Lagu Untukmu"; Artist : Meet Uncle Hussain; Composer : Taja (Nik Mustaza Nik Mustaffa) and Tass (Tassiq Saidi Hashim); Lyrics : Taja, Tass and Lan (Nor Azlan Rosle); Album : Runut bunyi siri TV KAMI: The Album (2008); 2009 : Title : "Pergi"; Artist : Aizat Amdan; Composer : Pete Teo; Lyrics : Pete Teo and Amran Omar; Album : Runut bunyi filem Talentime (2009); 2010 : Title : "Tolong Ingatkan Aku"; Artist : Ana Raffali; Composition : Ana Raffali; Lyrics : Ana Raffali; Album : Ketika Aku Kecil (2010); 2011 : Title : "Awan Nano"; Artist : Hafiz Suip; Composer : M. Nasir; Lirik: Budi Hekayat (Hasmi Hashim); Album : Masih Jelas (2009); 2012 : Title : "Terukir Di Bintang"; Artist : Yuna Zarai replaced by Aizat Amdan; Composer : Yuna Zarai; Lyrics : Yuna Zarai; Album : Terukir Di Bintang (2012); 2013 : Title : "Bahagiamu Deritaku"; Artist : Hafiz Suip; Composer : LY (Rosman Shafie); Lyrics : Baiduri (Norhayati Mohd Hashim); Album : Luahan Hati Anak Seni (2013); 2014 : Title : "Apa Khabar?"; Artists : Joe Flizzow and Sonaone; Composer : Mikael Adam Lozach (Sonaone); Lyrics : Johan Ishak (Joe Flizzow); Album : HAVOC (2013); 2015 : Title : "Potret"; Artists : Akim Ahmad & The Magistrate; Composer : Hang Nadim (Akim Ahmad); Lyrics : Kamar Empayar (Afham Ahmad); Album : Patriot (2015)	2016 : Title : "Lelaki Teragung"; Artist : Dayang Nurfaizah; Composer : Natashah; Lyrics : Iman Imran (Rudy Imran Shamsudin); Album : Dayang Nurfaizah (2017); 2017 : Title : "Jampi"; Artist : Hael Husaini; Composer : Hael Husaini & Ezra Kong; Lyrics : Hael Husaini & Ezra Kong; Published in a single format; 2018 : Title : "Haram"; Artist : Hael Husaini & Dayang Nurfaizah; Composer : Hael Husaini & Ezra Kong; Lyrics : Hael Husaini & Ezra Kong; Published in a single format; 2019 : Title : "Sumpah"; Artist : Naim Daniel; Composer : Naim Daniel & Omar K; Lyrics : Naim Daniel; Published in a single format; 2020 : Title : "Gila"; Artists : Kaka Azraff, Noki & Loca B; Composer : Ezra Kong, Ahmad Ikhwan Lee (Noki) & Nabilah Hani Azali (Loca B); Lyrics : Ezra Kong, Ahmad Ikhwan Lee (Noki) & Nabilah Hani Azali (Loca B); Published in a single format

Hint :

Title = Song title

Composition = Creator/Composer

Lyrics = Lyricist

Artist = Singer

Album = Album that published the song

Beginning in 1993, the Music Industry Awards (MIA) adding category in the best song award, and the following are the results comparison markers;

† = Song that won AIM Best Song

† S = Song that wins any AIM Best Category Song

‡ = Song nominated as Best Song / any AIM best category song

‡ S = Song nominated in any AIM best category song

If measured through competition through albums, the following are the markers;

† C = Album that wins any AIM Best Category Album

† K = Album that won AIM's Overall Best Album

‡ C = Album nominated in any AIM best category album

‡ K = Album nominated for AIM Overall Best Album

=== Runner-up & Third Place ===
- List of Runners-up of the Song Champion Award
- List of Third Place Winners of the Song Champion Award

=== Category Champions ===
When first organized in 1986, AJL competed in open categories for all song genres. However, from the 7th AJL (1992) to the 23rd AJL (2008), the organizers opened three categories arranged according to song genre. The categories are ballads, pop rock and creative ethnic Malaysian rhythms. The opening of this category, among others, to ensure that the traditional music genre also competes with today's pop songs. Competitions by category were abolished in 2009 due to a lack of entries from traditional rhythmic songs.

- Ballad Category Song Champion
- Pop Rock Category Song Champion
- Creative Ethnic Category Song Winner

== Special Category ==
=== Best Performance ===
- 1986 : Alleycats - "Sampaikan Salam Cintaku"
- 1987 : Sudirman Haji Arshad - "Merisik Khabar"
- 1988 : Ramlah Ram - "Kau Kunci Cintaku Dalam Hatimu"
- 1989 : Search Band - "Isabella"
- 1990 : Wings Band - "Sejati"
- 1991 : Shima - "Setelah Aku Kau Miliki"
- 1992 : Not contested
- 1993 : Fauziah Latiff - "Teratai Layu di Tasik Madu"
- 1994 : M. Nasir - "Tanya Sama Itu Hud-hud"
- 1995 : Aishah - "Cinta Beralih Arah"
- 1996 : Siti Nurhaliza - "Jerat Percintaan"
- 1997 : Siti Nurhaliza - "Aku Cinta Padamu"
- 1998 : Noraniza Idris - "Dikir Puteri"
- 1999 : Noraniza Idris - "Dondang Dendang"
- 2000 : Noraniza Idris - "Ngajat Tampi"
- 2001 : Siti Nurhaliza - "Ya Maulai" 70% jury / 30% SMS
- 2002 : Siti Nurhaliza - "Nirmala"
- 2003 : Siti Nurhaliza - "Ku Milikmu" 100% SMS
- 2004 : Noraniza Idris "Hatinya Tak Tahan"
- 2005 : Mawi - "Aduh Saliha" 50% jury / 50% SMS
- 2006 : Hazami - "Mungkir Bahagia"
- 2007 : Mawi - "Angan Dan Sedar" 50% jury / 50% SMS
- 2008 : Faizal Tahir - "Sampai Syurga"
- 2009 : Aizat Amdan - "Kau Aku"
- 2010 : Faizal Tahir - "Hanyut"
- 2011 : Alyah - "Kisah Hati"
- 2012 : Black Hanafiah & RJ - "Teman Pengganti" 100% SMS
- 2013 : Hafiz Suip - "Bahagiamu Deritaku" 100% SMS
- 2014 : Mojo & Caliph Buskers - "Romancinta" 50% SMS
- 2015 : Akim & The Majistret - "Potret" 100% SMS
- 2016 : Khalifah Band - "Hang Pi Mana" 100% Online Vote
- 2017 : Altimet - "Amboi"
- 2018 : Sufian Suhaimi - "Di Matamu" 50% jury / 50% Online Vote
- 2019 : Hafiz Suip - "Kisah Cinta Kita"
- 2020 : Zizi Kirana - "Eh" 100% Online Vote

=== Best Lyrics ===
- 1986 : Sekadar di Pinggiran (Lukhman S.)
- 1987 : Menaruh Harapan (Habsah Hassan)
- 1988 : Cukuplah Sekali (Habsah Hassan)
- 1989 : Isabella (Bob Lokman)
- 1990 : Suci Dalam Debu ( S. Amin Shahab )
- 1991 : Tiara (M. Nasir)
- 1992 : Pada Syurga Di Wajahmu (Bob Lokman)

Beginning in 1993, this category was not contested separately but counted in the creation of a song.

=== Best Vocals ===
This category was first competed in 2002 at the 17th Anugerah Juara Lagu

- 2002 : Liza Hanim - "Gelisah Mimpi"
- 2003 : Misha Omar - "Bunga-bunga Cinta"
- 2004 : Misha Omar - "Pulangkan"
- 2005 : Hazami - "Kata"
- 2006 : Adibah Noor - "Terlalu Istimewa"
- 2007 : Jaclyn Victor and Lah Ahmad - "Ceritera Cinta"
- 2008 : Faizal Tahir - "Sampai Syurga"
- 2009 : Black Hanafiah - "Aku Rindu Sayang Kamu"
- 2010 : Hafiz Suip - "Noktah Cinta"
- 2011 : Hafiz Suip - "Awan Nano"
- 2012 : Hafiz Suip - "Ku Akui"
- 2013 : Jaclyn Victor - "Ikut Rentakku"
- 2014 : Dayang Nurfaizah - "Di Pintu Syurga"
- 2015 : Dayang Nurfaizah - "Tak Pernah Menyerah"
- 2016 : Dayang Nurfaizah - "Lelaki Teragung"
- 2017 : Syamel & Ernie Zakri - "Aku Cinta"
- 2018 : Misha Omar - "Sampai Bila"
- 2019 : Hafiz Suip - "Kisah Cinta Kita"
- 2020 : Ernie Zakri - "Gundah"
- 2021 : Aina Abdul - "Sepi"
- 2022 : Aina Abdul - "Terus Hidup"
- 2023 : Aina Abdul - "Jangan Mati Rasa Itu"
- 2024 : Ernie Zakri - "Aura"

=== Other Awards ===
- 1995 : Most Entry Award (Singer): Rohana Jalil
- 1995 : Most Entry Award (Composer): M. Nasir
- 2009 : Popular Singer Award: Stacy - "Pakai Buang"
- 2009 : Most Downloaded Songs (Hotlink): Akim - "Bengang"
- 2011 : Celcom Mobile Champion Award: Anuar Zain - "Sedetik Lebih"
- 2012 : Celcom Mobile Champion Award: Hafiz Suip and Adira Suhaimi - "Ombak Rindu"
- 2013 : Celcom Mobile Champion Award: Hafiz Suip - "Bahagiamu Deritaku"
- 2015 : AJL Qu Diva Award: Siti Nurhaliza - "Cindai"
- 2017 : Samsung Singer of the Year Award: Khai Bahar - "Bayang"
- 2019 : Fan Choice Award Set: Haqiem Rusli - "Lembah Kesepian"

== Trivia ==
Find out more

The trivia section is not recommended under Wikipedia guidelines .

=== Double wins and entries ===
- If according to the open competition format, only Francissca Peter and Manan Ngah have ever won two main places in one ceremony, namely the Champion and Runner -up in the first AJL (1986). Ezra Kong managed to repeat the success of Manan Ngah when he won two main places in one ceremony, namely Champion with Loca B & Noki and Third Place with Hael Husaini in AJL 35 (2020) as composer and lyricist. Meanwhile, according to the category competition format, M. Nasir has twice won two of the three genre categories respectively in 1994 (Pop Rock & Malaysian Rhythm) and 1997 (Malaysian Rhythm & as lyricist for the Pop Rock category) as well as singer Siti Nurhaliza also twice in 1999 and 2000 (Malaysian Rhythm & Ballad).
- The only similar result for the Anugerah Juara Lagu and Music Industry Award for the overall Best Song category was through the song " Jerat Percintaan" sung by Siti Nurhaliza (Dato ') in 1996. While the song " Awan Nano " sung by Hafiz was the only one winner of Song Champion and also Best Song of the Anugerah Planet Muzik (APM) in 2013.
- The "Gila" victory made Kaka Azraff, Noki and Loca B the first trio singers to win the AJL.
- M. Nasir became the first composer to win the AJL four times with three songs sung by himself, namely through the song "Tanya Sama Itu Hud Hud" (1994), "Ghazal Untuk Rabiah" (1997), "Andalusia" (1999) and other singer's songs namely "Awan Nano" (2011) sung by Hafiz.
- Four artists have won the Juara Lagu as composer, lyricist and singer, namely M. Nasir for the song "Tanya Sama Itu Hud Hud" in 1994, Yasin for the song "Mimpi Laila" in 2001, Ana Raffali for the song "Tolong Ingatkan Aku" in 2010 and Yuna with the song "Terukir di Bintang" in 2012 . However, Yuna only sang the song herself in the semi-finals of Juara Lagu while during the final of AJL 27, Aizat Amdan replaced her because Yuna was tied to the album recording commitment in the United States.
- Ana Raffali was the first female composer to win a major award in 2010 (Tolong Ingatkan Aku), while Habsah Hassan was the first female lyricist to win the award in 1987 (Menaruh Harapan).
- Misha Omar was the first singer to win a major award for her debut song. The song Bunga-bunga Cinta which was recorded in 2002 was Misha's first recorded song and won the AJL in 2003. While the song Jerat Percintaan sung by Siti Nurhaliza was not the first song that he recorded even though it was taken from the singer's debut album.
- Hael Husaini is the first singer to win major awards for two consecutive editions through Jampi (AJL32) and Haram (with Dayang Nurfaizah) (AJL33). The win also made him and Ezra Kong the first composer and lyricist to top the AJL major award for two consecutive years.
- Until 2008 when the following year, the category participation was dissolved, only Siti Nurhaliza and Dayang Nurfaizah had participated in AJL in all categories. Siti participated in all alternate categories since 1998 while Dayang participated in the Pop Rock category in 2001 besides winning the Ballad category that year. In 2004, Dayang won the Creative Ethnic category.
- If we take into account the participation for the open category, only Dayang Nurfaizah is the singer who participated in all categories, namely 3 categories according to genre in the category format and participated in the AJL during the open format.
- Noh Salleh is the only singer who joined AJL in 4 out of 5 solo performance formats ("Angin Kencang"), in a voice/duo ("In Love With You" - Aizat Amdan), with the band ("Aku Skandal" & "Mencari Konklusi" - Hujan Band), in a group voice ("Pelita" - Monoloque & Azlan Rosle (API)). Noh just hasn't tried singing collaboratively with appearances ( featuring ).
- Shila Amzah is the only singer who joined AJL in 5 out of 5 solo performance formats ("Patah Seribu" & "Masih Aku Cinta"), in a voice/duo ("Selamanya Cinta" - Alif Satar & "Bahagiakan Dia" - Liza Hanim), with the band ("Pelukan Angkasa" - Sekumpulan Orang Gila (SOG)), in a group voice ("Beribu Sesalan" - Ning Baizura & Jaclyn Victor (3 Suara)) and singing collaboratively with appearances ("Pelukan Angkasa" - Sekumpulan Orang Gila (SOG) ft Shila Amzah).

- Dato 'Sri Siti Nurhaliza is the only singer to have won all three categories in different years, getting the best performance in all categories for the song "Jerat Percintaan" (1996), "Aku Cinta Padamu" (1997), "Ya Maulai " (2001)," Nirmala "(2002),"Ku Milikmu" (2003) and won the overall Juara Lagu for the ballad and Malaysian rhythm category but not for pop rock. She is also the most frequently qualified artist to AJL (after Rohana Jalil) from 1996 to 2003 and even Siti Nurhaliza topped the record by qualifying for AJL for 8 consecutive years. The number of songs sung by Siti Nurhaliza is also the most eligible for AJL with 18 songs for 9 years (1996 to 2003, and 2007).
  - 23 of her songs made it to the semi-finals
  - 18 of her songs made it to the finals
  - 17 trophies she has won
    - 5 Best Performance Trophies
    - 9 Category Champion Trophies (4 ballads, 4 Malaysian/creative ethnic rhythms, 1 pop rock)
    - 3 Song Champion Trophy
  - 8 years in a row participated in the finals
    - 7 consecutive years of ballad song participation to the finals. (1996–2002)
    - 5 consecutive years of participation in creative Malaysian/ethnic rhythm songs to the finals. (1998–2002)
    - 4 consecutive years of participation of 3 songs to the finals. (1998–2001)
    - 5 years not in a row pop rock song participation to the finals. (1998–1999, 2001, 2003, 2007)
- The only category that Siti Nurhaliza has never won is Best Vocal since the competition in 2002.
- For the open format, Hafiz Suip is the only singer who has won all the places in different years. He has won Song Champion (Awan Nano - AJL26 & Bahagiamu Deritaku - AJL28), Runner-up (Terimaku Seadanya - AJL31) with Misha Omar, Third Place (Noktah Cinta - AJL25 & Ku Akui - AJL27), Best Vocal (AJL25, AJL26, AJL27 & AJL34) and Best Performance (AJL28 & AJL34).
- Misha Omar, Jaclyn Victor, Hafiz Suip and Dayang Nurfaizah were the participants who won the Best Vocal award more than once. Misha Omar through his participation in 2003, 2004 and 2018, Jaclyn Victor in 2007 (duet with Lah Ahmad) and 2013. Hafiz won it in 2010, 2011, 2012 and 2019, making him the most winning singer in the category. Dayang Nurfaizah won it in 2014, 2015 and 2016.
- Among the artists who won big for a song including the overall winner in the Anugerah Juara Lagu are:
  - 1988 – Ramlah Ram (Best Song & Performance Winner): "Kau Kunci Cintamu Dalam Hatiku"
  - 1989 – Search Band (Winner of Best Song & Performance): "Isabella"
  - 1993 – Fauziah Latiff (Song Champion including Category & Best Performance Champion): "Teratai Layu di Tasik Madu"
  - 1994 – M. Nasir (Song Champion including Category Champion & Best Performance): "Tanya Sama Itu Hud -Hud" & Creative Ethnic Category Champion "Bonda"
  - 1995 – Aishah (Song Champion including Category & Best Performance Champion): "Cinta Beralih Arah"
  - 1996 – Siti Nurhaliza (Song Champion including Category & Best Performance Champion): "Jerat Percintaan"
  - 2000 – Siti Nurhaliza (Song Champion including Category Champion): "Balqis" & Ballad Category Champion "Kau Kekasihku"
  - 2003 – Misha Omar (Song Winner including Best Vocal & Category Winner): "Bunga-Bunga Cinta"
  - 2006 – Adibah Noor (Song Winner including Best Vocal & Category Winner): "Terlalu Istimewa"
  - 2009 – Aizat Amdan (Song Champion for the song "Pergi") & (Best Performance: "Kau Aku")
  - 2011 – Hafiz Suip (Best Song & Vocal Winner): "Awan Nano"
  - 2013 – Hafiz Suip (Song Champion, Best Performance & Mobile Champion): "Bahagiamu Deritaku"
  - 2015 – Akim & The Majistret (Winner of Best Song & Performance): "Potret"
  - 2016 – Dayang Nurfaizah (Best Song & Vocal Winner): "Lelaki Teragung"
- Artists who did NOT win Juara Lagu BUT won 2 or more awards at one Anugerah Juara Lagu:
  - 1997 – Siti Nurhaliza (Winner of Best Ballad & Performance Category): "Aku Cinta Padamu"
  - 1999 – Noraniza Idris - Best Performance & Winner of the Creative Ethnic Category "Hati Kama"
  - 1999 – Siti Nurhaliza - "Purnama Merindu" Ballad Category Winner & "Hati Kama" Creative Ethnic Category Winner
  - 2001 – Siti Nurhaliza (Pop Rock Category Champion): "Engkau Bagaikan Permata" & Best Performance: "Ya Maulai"
  - 2002 – Siti Nurhaliza (Winner of Creative Ethnic Category & Best Performance): "Nirmala"
  - 2004 – Misha Omar - Best Vocal & "Pulangkan" Ballad Category Winner
  - 2005 – Hazami - Best Vocal & "Kata" Pop Rock Category Winner
  - 2005 – Mawi - Best Performance & Winner of Creative Ethnic Category "Aduh Saliha"
  - 2008 – Faizal Tahir - Best Vocal, Best Performance & "Sampai Syurga" Ballad Category Winner
  - 2010 – Hafiz Suip - Third Place for the song "Noktah Cinta" & Best Vocal through the same song "Noktah Cinta"
  - 2012 – Hafiz Suip - Third Place for the song "Ku Akui" & Best Vocal through the same song "Ku Akui"
  - 2014 – Dayang Nurfaizah - Third Place & Best Vocal through the same song "Di Pintu Syurga"
  - 2018 – Misha Omar - Third Place & Best Vocal through the same song "Sampai Bila"
  - 2019 – Hafiz Suip - Best Vocal & Best Performance "Kisah Cinta Kita"
- Among the artists who have qualified for the finals of the Song Champion Award with 2 songs in one category solo are:
  - 2000 Anugerah Juara Lagu :
    - Siti Nurhaliza - Ballad Category - "Kau Kekasihku" & "Nian di Hati"
    - Noraniza Idris - Malaysian Rhythm/Creative Ethnic Category - "Tinting" & "Ngajat Tampi"
    - Amy Mastura - Pop Rock Category - "Bintang Hati" & "Sha Na Na"
- 2005 Anugerah Juara Lagu:
  - Jaclyn Victor - Ballad Category - "Gemilang" & "Wajah"
- 2007 Anugerah Juara Lagu:
  - Faizal Tahir - Ballad Category - "Kasih Tercipta" & "Mahakarya Cinta"
- 2008 Anugerah Juara Lagu:
  - Faizal Tahir - Ballad Category - "Sampai Syurga" & "Cuba"
- 2009 Anugerah Juara Lagu:
  - Aizat - "Pergi" & "Kau Aku"
- 2010 Anugerah Juara Lagu:
  - Faizal Tahir - "Hanyut" & "Selamat Malam"
- 2011 Anugerah Juara Lagu:
  - Yuna - "Gadis Semasa" & "Penakut"
- Exist and Bunkface are the most frequent music bands to the finals of the Juara Lagu with 4 entries:
  - Exist Band:
    - 1992 Anugerah Juara Lagu - "Untukmu Ibu" with vocalist Mamat
    - 1994 Anugerah Juara Lagu - "Anugerah" with vocalist Mamat.
    - 2002 Anugerah Juara Lagu - "Julia" with vocalist Ezad.
    - 2003 Anugerah Juara Lagu - "Percayakan Siti" with vocalist Ezad.
- Bunkface Band:
  - 2009 Anugerah Juara Lagu - "Situasi"
  - 2010 Anugerah Juara Lagu - "Extravaganza"
  - 2014 Anugerah Juara Lagu - "Rentak Laguku"
  - 2015 Anugerah Juara Lagu - "Malam Ini Kita Punya"
- Kool is also a music band that advanced to the final round of Song Champion 4 times in a row with their participation for the first time at the Anugerah Juara Lagu 1995 through the song "Kau dan Aku" (replacing Ning Baizura) and also became the champion in the Pop Rock category. At the 1996 Anugerah Juara Lagu, Kool Band once again reached the finals of Juara Lagu with an Independent song and this song also won the Pop Rock category making Kool Band one of the first music groups to win the category 2 times in a row.
- Among the songs sung by the Kool Group in Juara Lagu are:
  - 1995 Anugerah Juara Lagu - Kau Dan Aku (replacing Ning Baizura)
  - 1996 Anugerah Juara Lagu - Bebas
  - 1997 Anugerah Juara Lagu - Cemburu
  - 1998 Anugerah Juara Lagu - Satu Arah
- All of these songs were nominated in the Pop Rock category, where the song "Kau Dan Aku" and "Bebas" was the category champion.
- Renowned lyricist, Habsah Hassan is the most nominated lyricist in the history of AJL. She won the best lyrics category twice with the songs "Menaruh Harapan" (1987) and "Cukuplah Sekali" (1988).

=== Entry more than three times but failed ===
- With a total of 7 entries, Stacy is the most frequent singer to the final stage without any wins.
- Artists who have participated in the Juara Lagu three times without winning any awards:
  - Stacy - 7 times (2008, 2009, 2010, 2012, 2013, 2014, 2015)
  - Hazama Azmi - 7 times (4 times with The Penglipurlara: 2013, 2016, 2017 and 2019; once with Amy Search in 2012), 2014 and 2015 as a solo singer
  - Noh Salleh (Hujan) - 5 times (2 times with Hujan: 2009, 2010, once with API and Aizat Amdan respectively in 2010 and 2013) and 2015 as a solo singer
  - Exist Band - 4 times (1992, 1994, 2002, 2003)
  - Bunkface - 4 times (2009, 2010, 2014, 2015)
  - Erra Fazira - 3 times (1999, 2000, 2004)
  - Anuar Zain - 3 times (1998, 2003, 2004)
  - Shura - 3 times (2002, 2004, 2006)
  - Zamani Ibrahim - 3 times (once with Slam Band (1996), 2002 and 2004 as a solo singer)
  - Man Bai - 3 times (2 times with Gersang Band: 1988, 1989 and 1996 as a solo singer)
  - Mus (MAY) - 3 times (2 times with the MAY Band: 1989, 2003 and 1997 as a singer of the Wings Band)
  - Hattan - 3 times (1991, 1992, 2014)

=== Non-Malay and foreign participation ===
- Non-bumiputera singers who have made it to the AJL finals are Alleycats (1986, 1987), Ben Nathan (1988) and Jaclyn Victor (2005, 2007, 2011) (Indian) as well as Vince (2004) (Chinese English), Casey (1995) (Chinese & Indian) and Elizabeth Tan (2015).
- Singers of bumiptera descent other than the Malay tribe who have participated in this competition are Rich (2007, 2008), Stacy (2008–2010, 2012 - 2013 and 2014), Jimmy Palikat (2012) (Kadazan-Dusun) and Lina Kamsan (1993) (Javanese). Only Francissca Peter (1986–1988) of Serani descent was the AJL champion in 1986.
- Aubrey Suwito became the first non-Bumiputera composer to win the AJL main award in 2005 for his song "Gemilang", he is Indonesian Peranakan Chinese descent. Meanwhile, Pete Teo through the song "Pergi" in 2009 became the first composer of Chinese descent to win the AJL.
- Endang Es Taurina and Rio Febrian, are two Indonesian singers who have competed in the finals of the Juara Lagu. Endang through the song "Sangkar Emas" created by A. Ali and Lukhman S. in 1990 while Rio did not perform (represented by Lah Ahmad) when selected through the song "Ceritera Cinta" in 2007. While Glenn Fredly had advanced to the semi-finals the end of the Ballad in 2000 through the song "Dengarkanlah" (duet with Amy Mastura) created by Helen Yap, but lost.
- Adi Priyo, vocalist and composer for the group 6ixth Sense, had competed in the semi-finals with 4 songs, but failed to advance to all of them. The songs are "Tanpa" (AJL 23), "Khatimah Cinta" (AJL 25), "Menyesal" and "Cinta Matiku" (AJL 26). However, through his participation as a composer, Adi's song titled "Kisah Hati" sung by Alyah made it to the 26th AJL (also won the Best Performance award).
- M. Nasir started competing in the Anugerah Juara Lagu in 1990 with the song "Mustika". Prior to that, many of M. Nasir's songs sung in groups or solo could not compete due to his Singapore citizenship status . Some of his works with Malaysian artists such as Rahim Maarof, Kumpulan Search and Nasir Jani could not be competed even though they were quite popular at the time.
- The song "Puteri Ledang" sung by Lina Kamsan in 1993 was sung entirely in Javanese. While the song "Andalusia" by M. Nasir in 1999, "Mimpi Laila" Yasin Sulaiman in 2001, "Wassini" sung by Waheeda in 2003, and the song "Taat" sung by Rohana Jalil in 2005 are a mixture of Malay and Arabic songs. "Andalusia" and "Mimpi Laila" won the AJL Overall Champion while "Wassini" won the Malaysian Rhythm/Creative Ethnic Category Champion.

=== Performance by a substitute singer ===
- The performance of the song is not necessarily sung by the original singer in the finals of the Juara Lagu. If the original singer can't sing it, the songwriter has to find a replacement if he doesn't want to withdraw. Interestingly, there were substitutes who managed to win any category and in 2012, Aizat Amdan who replaced Yuna Zarai through the song "Terukir Di Bintang" became the first substitute singer to win the AJL main award.
- Some of the songs that qualified for the AJL finals but were not sung by the original singer are:
  - 1986 – "Perjalananku" - Original singer Jamal Abdillah - Sung by Azman Abu Hassan
  - 1986 – "Cinta yang Terbiar" - Original singer Jamal Abdillah - Sung by Rohana Jalil (won)
  - 1987 – "Angan-angan" - Original singer Raja Ema - Sung by Skyfire Band
  - 1994 – "Bukan Aku Tak Cinta" - Original singer of Iklim Band - Sung by Adilla
  - 1995 – "Kau dan Aku" - Original singer Ning Baizura - Sung by Kool Band (won category)
  - 1995 – "Cinta Dangdut" - Original singer Ayati Tasrip - Sung by Masleena
  - 2006 – "Candak" - Original singer of Syura - Sung by Siti Nordiana
  - 2007 – "Izinku Pergi" - Singer from Kaer - Sung by Sahri (won)
  - 2007 – "Mahakarya Cinta" - Original singer Faizal Tahir - Sung by Fiq
  - 2007 – "Kasih Tercipta" - Original singer Faizal Tahir - Sung by Bob
  - 2011 – "Sedetik Lebih" - Original singer Anuar Zain - Sung by Jaclyn Victor
  - 2012 – "Terukir Di Bintang" - Original singer Yuna Zarai - Sung by Aizat Amdan (win)
  - 2014 – "Lelaki" - Original singer Yuna Zarai - Sung by Najwa Mahiaddin & The Palauans
  - 2017 – "Sejati" - Original singer Faizal Tahir - Sung by Azmi Caliph Buskers (won)
  - 2018 – "Bunga" - Original singer Altimet - Sung by De Fam
  - 2019 – "Anta Permana" - Original singer Siti Nurhaliza - Sung by Bob Yusof (won)
  - 2019 – "Ragaman" - Original singer Faizal Tahir - Sung by Fairuz Misran
  - 2020 – "Aku Bidadari Syurgamu" - Original singer Siti Nurhaliza - Sung by Aishah
- The duet song may be sung by the same singer for one of the duet couples, but when the Juara Lagu, one of the couples who sings it is an alternate singer:
  - 2006 – "Hantaran Hati" - Original singers Bob & Rosiah Chik - however due to the death of Rosiah Chik, her duet partner was replaced by Aspalela Abdullah.
  - 2007 – "Ceritera Cinta" - Original singer Jaclyn Victor & Rio Febrian - This song was originally sung by Jaclyn Victor with Indonesian singer Rio Febrian. However, Rio was not present to perform and was replaced by Lah Ahmad. The combination of Jaclyn and Lah won Best Vocal, making Lah the first replacement singer to win Best Vocal.
  - 2008 – "Doa Dalam Lagu" - Original singers Mawi & Heliza - Mawi was unable to join AJL for some reason.
  - 2012 – "Teman Pengganti" - Original singer Black Hanifah & Malique - This song saw the singer Black Hanafiah not perform with original rapper Malique Ibrahim who is also the composer, instead being replaced by new rapper, RJ. The combination of Black Hanafiah and RJ won Best Performance, making RJ the first replacement singer to win the category.
  - 2014 – "RomanCinta" - This song, the song of the Mojo Band was originally sung by its vocalist Aweera. However, Aweera has left the Mojo group and sheltered under another recording company causing Edry Abdul Halim to have to find a new vocalist to replace him. However, after a dispute arose with the original singer, Mojo chose to perform instead being represented by a group of street musicians with disability status (OKU), Caliph Buskers whom he met at Jalan Tuanku Abdul Rahman a few weeks before the competition. Caliph Buskers won Best Performance for the song.
  - 2016 – "Setia" - Original singers Elizabeth Tan & Faizal Tahir - Elizabeth Tan still competed in the Juara Lagu, but her duet partner was replaced by Awi Rafael.
  - 2020 – "7 Nasihat" - Original singers Kmy Kmo, Luca Sickta & Siti Nurhaliza - Kmy Kmo and Luca Sickta still compete in the Song Champion while Siti is replaced by Shiha Zikir .
- The song "Rayuanku" sung by Rohana Jalil was actually created especially for Zaiton Sameon . In fact, all the songs in the album Rayuanku were indeed created by A. Ali for Zaiton Sameon . Earlier, in the first edition of Juara Lagu, Rohana performed through the song "Cinta Yang Terbiar" representing singer Jamal Abdillah and won the third consolation place for Best Performance as well as becoming the first substitute singer to win any side prize at AJL.
- The song "Terukir Di Bintang" was the only song sung by the replacement singer to win the first place in AJL. The song was supposed to be sung by Yuna but due to the discrepancy of Yuna's recording schedule in the United States, Yuna has suggested that the song be handed over to Uji Rashid . However, at the last minute, TV3 decided to give the responsibility to Aizat .
- Songs sung by singers who are different from the original singers in a group have also competed in Song Champions, for example Ekamatra who participated in 1990, through the song "Sentuhan Kecundang" and "Pusara Di Lebuhraya".

=== Intermission Performance ===
- Aznil Nawawi with a group called "The Gambit" once brought back the memory of AJL in the 10th AJL intermission show by showing how he ruined the performance of the best AJL songs. Among them is from the show "Janji Manismu". Aznil snatched the bag from "Aishah" and took things out of the bag and the things were kitchen items like pans, stone mortars and grinders!
- There are six intermission performances that advance to next year's Juara Lagu:
  - "Siti Payung" - Liza Aziz (1992): 1991 interlude (themed Malaysian Rhythm)
  - "Dir" - Rahim Maarof (1993): interlude 1992 (in commemoration of the passing of the late Sudirman)
  - "Gaia" - Zainal Abidin (2005): interlude 2004 (in conjunction with the theme of the Symphony of a Million Worlds)
  - "Drama King" - Meet Uncle Hussein & Black (2010): 2009 interlude (in conjunction with representing the independent music revolution)
  - "Bangun" - Aman RA (2019): 2018 interlude (in conjunction with representing the hip hop music revolution)
  - "Eh" - Zizi Kirana (2020): opening 2019 (performed by another artist in conjunction with representing the creation of D. Navindran (composer))
- Aishah's performance always showed a difference every time she participated. The first time was the song "Janji Manismu" with the prop of a bag featuring Aishah wanting to go far. Secondly, for the song "Cinta Beralih Arah", Aishah danced with a " phantom " after her love was cheated on while "Kasihnya Balqis", Aishah brought her two sons while talking about Balqis before bedtime.
- Prior to 1990, all solo female artists who sang ballads sang the song solo without " props ". Aishah has led the show with props through the song "Janji Manismu" which she has used tables, lamps, pictures and large bags. Shima, on the other hand, became the first artist to be raised when performing through the song "Setelah Aku Kau Miliki" in 1991. After that, many singers have diversified their performances until now.

Year	Opening		Interlude	
Year	Artist	Song	Artist	Song
1986	Matahari Dancers hosted by Jaafar Onn Music by Ooi Eow Jin	Dance montage "Muzik Muzik"	Bangkit Dance Company / Fauzi Marzuki Federal Ballet Academy / Kenny Band, Remy & Martin Antara Band / Abbas Bakar	Rampaitari: Instrumental pop "Jejaka Idaman" Instrumental balada "Demi Seorang Kawan" Instrumental etnik "Telah Kau Lukai"
1987			Normadiah Ahmad Daud Aziz Sattar S. Samsudin Nasir P.Ramlee	Panca Sitara Group's Special Performance;- "When It's Late" "Who's That?" "Menceceh Bujang Lapok" "Mawarku" "Anekaragam"
1988	Inderawangi Dancers Group (led by Mahani Mydin)	Dance "Music Music Techno"	Special Interruptions; • Shidee • Salih Yaacob • Abdullah Chik & Noraniza Idris • Jamilul Hayat	Rampailagu Pop Melayu: "Senjakala" (Malay Pop), "Puteri Remaja" (Dangdut), "Kaparinyo" (Malay Deli), "Mawar Putih Tanda Perpisahan" (Original)
1989	All competing artists	Rampailagu Keratan Lagu-lagu bertanding	Rampailagu Variation Azian Artist Mazwan Safuan Zulkifli Mohamed Musa Abu Salimah Mahmood Suliza Salam Rohayu Majid	Rampailagu Lagu-lagu bekas pemenang "Kerna Terpaksa" / "Aku Kehilanganmu" / "Sekadar Di Pinggiran" "Sampaikan Salam" / "Sayang Semuanya Telah Terlambat" "Tika Dan Saat Ini" "Menaruh Harapan" "I'm Shackled" "You're the Key to My Love"
1990				
1991	Aishah Accompanied by Dewi Kasturi Dance Troop dancers	"Seloka Rindu"	SM Salim Ruhil Amani Abdullah Chik Liza Aziz Ramli Sarip	"What Happened?" "Anak Raja Turun Beradu" "Godam Godam Pol" "Siti Payung" "Temasya Desa Gemalai"
1992			Rahim Maarof	"Dir"
1993	Kit Kat Club Dancers run by Tiara Jacquelina	Dance "Music Music"	Aishah	Rampailagu;- "Sensation" "Never Gave Up On You" "Janji Manismu" "Seloka Rindu" "Doa" "Tari Silat Melayu"
1994	Kit Kat Club Dancers run by Tiara Jacquelina	Indian Modern Dance	Sofia Jane Kit Kat Club run by Tiara Jacquelina	Dance "Tari Tualang Tiga" ( Sanisah Huri ) Rampaitari Evolusi Muzik Malaysia;- "Siapa Itu?" (Zainab Majid) "Baju Kebaya" ( Blues Gang ) "Isabella" ( Search ) "Awas!" ( KRU )
1995	Kit Kat Dancers Club hosted by Tiara Jacquelina Petronas Dancers Team	Malay Traditional Dance "Lambang Sari" Dance	Aznil Nawawi & The Gambit	Parody "After Me You Have", "Tomb On The Highway", "Merisik Khabar", "Say My Love Greetings", "Your Sweet Promise" & "Tiara" Singing the song "You're a Star"
1996	Vogue Dancers managed by Ahmad Kassan	"Planet" Dance (Techno-funk)	Zalee and the Redang Group	"I Came From Far Away" "Redang (Drums and Drums)"
1997	Combo leader Aznul Haidi	Music Orchestra of the Future	Ruhil Amani	"Poet's Dance"
1998	Shamsul Ghau Ghau Anne Hamid	Parody of the song "Hits Buatmu" ("13 Tahun Juara Lagu Buatmu")	Puteri- Puteri Sinaran; Harmira Yusof Fadilah Sarif Dayang Noraini	Rampailagu 3 Nuances; "Tanda Harga Cinta" "Mutiara Rindu" "Cinta Kita"
1999	EZ Dancers	Rampaitari Mystical Dance	Wah Idris Song Champion Orchestra	Malaysian Music to the World Stage
2000	Mohar and the Malaysian National Choir	Instrumental flute "Soul Vibration"	Hani Mohsin (as Sazali) and Jalaluddin Hassan (Hassan) Jamal Abdillah Jalaluddin Hassan (Ramli), Umie Aida (Salmah), Ucop Cecupak (Sudin) and Lah Cecupak (Aziz) Jamal Abdillah and Fauziah Latiff Rosyam Nor ( Sharif Dol) and Sharifah Haslinda (Salmah) Fauziah Latiff Kumpulan Kristal Hani Mohsin and Umie Aida Anuar Zain Fauziah Latiff, Jamal Abdillah, Anuar Zain, Razlan (Kristal) and the National Choir SM Salim	Tribute P. RamleeFragment "Anakku Sazali" "Anakku Sazali" Fragment "Seniman Bujang Lapok" "Gelora" Tribute SalomaFragmen "Seniman Bujang Lapok" "Senandung Kasih" Tribute M. ShariffKeindahan Pantai (Zai Zai Zai) Tribute Sudirman Interlud "Basikal Tua" "Salam Terakhir" "Di Mana Kan Ku Cari Ganti" "Living Legend" Award SM Salim
2001	The Drum Group consists of; Kompang Rebana Ubi Kalimpungan/Gamelan Sarawak Tabla India Chinese Drum	Paluan "Gendang Gending Malaysia"	Swatari Dance Group Voice Group	Rampaitari and choir of Malay Rhythm songs (from the last AJL);- "Kalau Mencari Teman" "Bonda" "Cindai" "Diari YB" "Seni Berzaman" "Hati Kama" "Ghazal Untuk Rabiah " " Samrah Mentari " " Balqis "
2002	Voice;- VE Group Ruffedge Group Voice	A capella "Mimpi Laila" Rampailagu a capella 12 finalist songs in turn (introduction of participants);- Ruffedge (Pop Rock) VE (Ballad) Swara (Creative Ethnic) A capella "Ayu" (introduction hos)	Orchestra composed and led by Ramli MS Choreography by Onn Jaafar	"Inspiration" Orchestra Performance
2003	Adibah Noor Dayang Nurfaizah	Rampailagu 12 Finalist Songs AJL18	Adibah Noor & Dayang Nurfaizah Hazami & Sarah Raisuddin Bandi Amuk, Muix Metalasia & Neves Pretty Ugly Ella	"Zapin Pak Ngah Balik" "Joget Kenangan Manis" "Tiada Lagi Cinta" "Rindu/Selamat Jalan Romeo"
2004	Kumpulan Mohram Kumpulan Swatari Orkes Swakarya	Instrumental and Dance "Symphony of a Million Nature"	Ning Baizura Amy Mastura Ezad Lazim Rem Kassim Kumpulan FO'3 ft. Karam Singh Walia Zainal Abidin	"Kedamaian" "Suria Khatulistiwa" "Indahnya Alam" "Nusantara" "Simfoni Sejuta Alam Beat" "Gaia"
2005	Halim Yazid Shazze Ishak	Rampailagu Finalist AJL20 by dikir barat, acapella and hip hop teams	Interlude Mixture of Continuous Music Evolution Ito Blues Gang & Neves Pretty Ugly Jamal Abdillah & Misha Omar Amy Search & Andy Flop Poppy KRU Group Innuendo M. Nasir Group Dina Nadzir Ruffedge Group Ahli Fiqir Group	Rampailagu Pelbagai Genre: "Apo Nak Dikato?" "Kehebatan Cinta" "Fantasia Bulan Madu" "Fanatik" "Belaian Jiwa" "Ada" "Cinta Datang Lagi" "Lemas" "Inilah Barisan Kita"
2006	Francissca Peter with Quest Group and Left Man	"Just On The Edge"	Faizal Tahir Joe Flizzow feat. Ima Dayang Nurfaizah Noraniza Idris & Kumpulan Ruffedge Ella Joe Flizzow, Yasin Sulaiman, Filsuf Daly & Akbar	"Raikan Cinta" "How Me Seksi" "Penawar Rindu" "Onjak Sekaki" "Ulek Mayang" "Alhamdulillah"
2007	Dayang Nurfaizah	Rampailagu "Senang Tari" / "Asmaradana"	Hazami Hattan & Dayang Nurfaizah Nikki Pallikat Ziana Zain The Lima	"Kata" "Fantasia Bulan Madu" "Caramu" "Keabadian Cinta" "Seindah Biasa"
2008	One Nation Emcees Group	Rampailagu AJL23 finalist songs with hip hop beats	Wada Syuhada & Jaclyn Victor Haqiem Rusli & Jamal Abdillah Hafiz & M. Nasir Semua Idola Kecil & Juara Lagu	"Gemilang", "Gadis Melayu" , "Andalusia", "Isabella"
2009	Siti Nurhaliza & Azlan & The Typewriter	Rampainuansa "Lagu Untukmu" in the composition of Balada, Dangdut & Rock	Jefrydin & The Siglap Five Jay Jay & Kumpulan Carefree Amy & Kumpulan Search Hazama Azmi, Black Hanifah & Kumpulan Meet Uncle Hussain	"Termenung" / "Tahukah Sayang" "Dendangan Laguku" / "Rindu Bayangan" "Pawana" / "Fantasia Bulan Madu" "Drama King" / "Pari-pari Di Bawah Angin"
2010	Francissca Peter Nash Elias M. Nasir	"Just On The Edge" "In Heaven In Your Face" "Ask The Same Hud-hud" / "Ghazal For Rabiah"	Sharifah Aini Ziana Zain Siti Nurhaliza	Rampailagu "Kau Tinggi Di Awan Biru" / "Oh Di Mana" Rampailagu "Anggapanmu" / "Madah Berhelah" Rampailagu "Nirmala" / "Balqis" / "Cindai"
2011	Jamal Abdillah Awie Sheila Majid	"Senandung Semalam" "Bujang Senang" "Warna"	Black Hanifah Hazama Azmi Azlan & The Typewriter	Rampailagu Sudirman Arshad - "Hidup Sederhana (Basikal Tua)" / "Balik Kampung" / "Chow Kit Road" / "Salam Terakhir"
2012	Misha Omar Ziana Zain Faizal Tahir	"Flowers of Love" "Fatalistic" "Anti-Gravity"	Rody Kristal, AG Coco, Edrie Hashim & Man Kidal Rahmad Tohak Aris Ariwatan Joey BPR Ramli Sarip	"Quartet Guitarist" "Shadow Prank" "Daydreaming Stopped" "A Thousand Years Will Not Be Possible" "Kamelia"
2013	Shila Amzah Mus Showdown	"Mahakarya Cinta" Football Dance	WARIS and Zaidee ONE Ziana Zain feat. Daly Filsuf M. Daud Kilau feat. WARIS Amy	"Intro Pawana" "Putus Terpaksa" / "Sangkar Cinta" "Cik Mek Molek" / "Gila Judi" "Pawana"
2014	Black Wings & Shahrudin bin Saniman (Ujang) Joe Wings & Rody Kristal (Guitar) Genervie Kam (Piano) Orkestra Pimpinan Ramli MS Kumpulan Kembara M.Nasir	"Drum Battle" Guitar Battle Piano A combination of musicians and orchestras of Rampailagu Kembara: "Hati Emas" "Mentera Semerah Padi"	Mentor Legend Finalists (Interlude 1) Tomok & Ronnie Hussein (Intro-Interlud) Headwind Group (Interlud)	"Ku Mohon" (For the 2014 flood disaster) "Kita Serupa" (intro-interlud) "Rampailagu Interlud;-: "Memori Luka"; "Suraya" " Segalanya Mungkin "
2015	Yasin Sulaiman Jamal Abdillah Siti Nurhaliza	Rampailagu;- "Cindai" "Mimpi Laila" "Ghazal Untuk Rabiah"	Selingan 1 (Intermission);- Hafiz Suip Jaclyn Victor Selingan 2;- Kumpulan Nico Izara Aishah dan Ensembel Showdown The Movie Selingan 3;- Rahmad Tohak (Mega) Azlan Rosle (The Typewriter)	Rampailagu;- "Kau Kunci Cintaku Dalam Hatimu" "Awan Nano" "Gemilang" Mash-up dance;- "Inilah Nasibku (Remix)" Rampailagu;- "Relaku Pujuk" "Takdir dan Waktu" " Song For You "
2016	Jaclyn Victor with the group El Gamma Panumbra	"Gemilang"	Man Bai Ameng Spring Ella	"Masih Aku Terasa" "Sampai Hati" "Permata Pemotong Permata" "Layar Impian"
2017	Retrospective StacyStacy Edrie Hashim AG Coco Waris Intro Music & FashionAlif Satar Nasha Aziz Aleeza Kasim Tinie	"I'm Stacy" "Bored" "Wear It Off" "I Feel Good" Introduction to the Music & Fashion Edition Cup by selected models	Issey Fazlisham Datuk A Rahman Hassan Datuk Awie Sarah Raisuddin Datuk Jeffridin	Open Stage "Tak Mengapa" "Suzana" "Hidup Bersama" "Syurga Bersama" "Siapa Gerangan" "Kenanganku"
2018	Kumpulan Search ft. DJ Fuzz Alif Satar & Sherry Alhadad	"Pelesit Kota" "We Will Rock You"	Throwback InterludeIsmail Izzani, Sarah Suhairi, Nabila Razali & National Choir Group Interlude BBoys & BGirls / Nico G / Juzzthin / Balan / Lil 'J / Zizi Kirana / Aman Ra / Joe Flizzow / SonaOne / Alif	Throwback Interlude"Seribu Impian" InterludeKegemilangan Hip-hop & Rap "Fanatik" / "Inilah Nasibku" / "Anak Ayam" / "Nak Ke Tak Nak" / "Bangun" / "Apa Khabar" / "Sampai Jadi" / "Sang Saka Biru"
2019	AJL Best Vocal Winners: Adibah Noor Hazami Lah Ahmad Liza Hanim Jaclyn Victor Black Misha Omar assisted by: Marsha Milan Asmidar Salma Asis Apex Tajudin Pasha Amir Masdi Megat Sarah Suhairi Usop Malaysian National Choir	"Teenager and Virgin" "Vroom Vroom" "You're the Same" "At the Gates of Heaven" "Let It Go" "Are You Waiting For Me" "Portrait" "Shadow" "Falling Up" "Eh" "Tik Tok" "Dirgahayu"	Interlud Kembara Seni M. Nasir Ameng Spring David Arumugam Hattan Fredo Flybaits M. Nasir	"Sampai Hati" "Kerana" "Memburu Rindu" "Kenangan Lalu" "Srikandi Cintaku" "Suatu Masa"
2020	Open Stage Yonnyboii Naim Daniel Ella Aminuddin Faizal Tahir Towards Jaclyn Victor Siti Nordiana	"Gemilang" "Baik Semula" (Theme for Covid 19)	Interlude 1: Sponsored by SabellaFaizal Tahir Interlud Diva vs Band Misha Omar & Akim & The Magistrate Ziana Zain & Hazama Azmi & The Penglipurlara Dayang Nurfaizah & Kugiran Hujan	"Sabella" " Until When x Portrait " " Relakan Jiwa x Madah Berhelah " " Dayang Sayang Kamu x Aku Skandal "

=== Others ===
- Songs that were competed in AJL before 1992 were not categorized and even before 1992, the songs that were brought to AJL were the monthly champion songs. Songs that competed in the AJL after 2009 came back not categorized in a different way, namely including the semi -finals.
- Misha Omar is one of the new singers who was given the opportunity to perform on the red carpet during the 17th edition of AJL. Interestingly, during the 18th edition, Misha joined the next AJL (AJL 18 - 2003) to win that year.
- Not all artists who make two performances get the jury's attention to be crowned Song Champions or category champions. Among the artists who risked two or more performances, but failed to win any Song Champion awards or category champions that year:
  - 1987 Song Champion - Alleycats Group - "Sekeping Hati Yang Luka" & "Hadirmu"
  - 1988 Song Champion - Kumpulan Gersang - "Suratan Takdir" & "Masih Aku Terasa"
  - 1989 Song Champion - Wings Group - "Taman Rashidah Utama" & "Misteri Mimpi Syakilla"
  - 1990 Song Champion - Ekamatra Group - "Pusara Di Lebuhraya" & "Sentuhan Kecundang"
  - 1994 Song Champion - Rohana Jalil - "Naluri Cinta" & "Jangan Main Mata"
  - 1997 Song Champion - Ziana Zain - "Kalau Mencari Teman" & "Senja Nan Merah"
  - 2000 Song Winner - Noraniza Idris - "Tinting" & "Ngajat Tampi"
  - 2001 Song Winner - Nora - "Menyemai Cinta Bersamamu" & "Desa Tercinta"
  - 2007 Song Champion - Faizal Tahir - "Kasih Tercipta" & "Mahakarya Cinta" ( not competing due to suspension )
  - 2010 Song Champion - Faizal Tahir - "Hanyut" & "Selamat Malam"
  - 2011 Song Champion - Yuna - "Current Girl" & "Coward"
  - 2017 Song Champion - Syamel - "Lebih Sempurna" & "Aku Cinta" (duet Ernie Zakri)
    - Wings songs, Noraniza Idris and Faizal Tahir, still received awards in the Best Performance category. Wings won Best Performance through two songs that competed, while Noraniza Idris won it through the song Ngajat Tampi and Faizal Tahir won it through the song Hanyut.

=== Age of participation ===
Youngest Artist

Original Artist/Singer	Age At Presentation	Song	Edition
Along / G-Nola (Exists Group musician)	14 years 4 months 10 days	"For you Mom"	AJL 7
Mamat (singer of the group Exists)	14 years 7 months 27 days	"For you Mom"	AJL 7
Syura Badron	16 years 3 months 6 days	"Meditation Meditation"	AJL 17
Syazliana Abdul Karim	16 years 5 months 18 days	"Dance Step Eight"	AJL 17
Najwa Latif	16 years 8 months 6 days	"Facebook loved"	AJL 26
Haida Hasnan	16 years 11 months 30 days	"Sweet Time to Make Love"	AJL 10
Ajai (Exists group musician)	17 years 9 months 6 days	"Untukmu Ibu"	AJL 7
Siti Nurhaliza	17 years 11 months 17 days	"Romance Snare"	AJL 11
Zehra Zambri	18 years 1 month 5 days	"Semalakama"	AJL 20
Acis (Gersang musician)	18 years 2 months 6 days	"I Still Feel" "Letter of Destiny"	AJL 3
Azian Mazwan Sapuwan	18 years 2 months 19 days	"The Small House of a Thousand Pillars"	AJL 8
Syura Badron	18 years 3 months 10 days	"Nazam Berkasih"	AJL 19
Stacy Anam	18 years 5 months	"I'm Stacy"	AJL 23
Shahrul (Ekamatra Group musician)	18 years 6 months 18 days	"Graves On The Highway" "The Touch Of Loss"	AJL 5
Aiman Tino	18 years 6 months 26 days	"Ku Rela Dibenci"	AJL 31
Edry Abdul Halim (KRU Group singer)	18 years 7 months 18 days	"Understand"	AJL 9
Najwa Latif	16 years 8 months 3 days	"Friend"	AJL 28
Siti Nurhaliza	18 years 11 months 16 days	"I love you"	AJL 12
Akim Ahmad	18 years 11 months 23 days	"Angry"	AJL 24

- ↑ Note 1 The Exists Group through their participation in 1992 consisted of 3 members under the age of 16 besides Mamat, namely G-Nola (14 years old) and Ajai (15 years old) as well as being the youngest group artist to join AJL.

The Oldest Singer

Original Singer	Age At Presentation	Song	Edition
Rosiah Chik *	74 years 20 days	"Heart Delivery"	AJL 21
M. David Kilau	64 years 6 months 2 days	"Tenung Tenung Renung Renung"	AJL 17
Rosiah Chik |	63 years 11 months 30 days	"Joget Senandung Dua"	AJL 10
Jamal Abdillah |	61 years 9 months	"Shackles of Missing"	AJL 35
Amy Search	56 years 5 months 21 days	"Rentak Laguku"	AJL 29
Sohaimi Mior Hassan	55 years 21 days	"If Dating"	AJL 26
Amy Search	54 years 5 months 9 days	"Symmetry"	AJL 27
Rohana Jalil	50 years 11 months 18 days	"Taat"	AJL 20
Hattan	50 years 28 days	"Jolobu Girl"	AJL 29
M. Nasir	49 years 6 months 17 days	"Juwita Citra Terindah" "Lagu Jiwa Lagu Cinta"	AJL 21
Zainal Abidin	46 years 2 months 29 days	"Gaia"	AJL 20

Substitute Singer	Age At Presentation	Song	Edition	Note
Aspalela Abdullah	61 years 20 days	"Heart Delivery"	AJL 21	Replacing Rosiah Chik
Aishah	56 years 1 month 4 days	"I am the Angel of Your Heaven"	AJL 35	Replacing Siti Nurhaliza

- ↑ Note 1 Rosiah Chik died a year before the finals of AJL21, and her participation as a finalist was posthumous. The age if he was still alive on the night of the show was 75 years 21 days. Rosiah was replaced by another veteran singer, Aspalela Abdullah

Composer

- G-Nola, Badiq Sheikh Hamzah & Najwa Latif are the youngest composers to join AJL at the age of 16 in the 1994 and 2011 editions respectively.
- Ika Latif, who is also Najwa Latif's sister, became the youngest lyricist at the age of 19, through a song with Najwa Latif entitled "Cinta Muka Buku" in 2011.

== List of overall winners ==
The following are for each year of the competition, the winning song, the performer(s), composer and lyricist of the song:

Year	Title	Performer	Composer	Lyricist	Ref
1986	"Sekadar di Pinggiran"	Francissca Peter	Manan Ngah	Lukhman S.	
1987	"Menaruh Harapan"	Zaiton Sameon	A. Ali	Habsah Hassan	
1988	"Kau Kunci Cintaku di dalam Hatimu"	Ramlah Ram	Ahmad Nawab	Wielid	
1989	"Isabella"	Search	Search (2)	Bob Lokman	
1990	"Janji Manismu"	Aishah	Adam Ahmad	Aishah (2)	
1991	"Takdir dan Waktu"	Mega	Rahim Othman	Juwie	
1992	"Pada Syurga di Wajahmu"	Nash	Fauzi Marzuki	Bob Lokman (2)	
1993	"Teratai Layu di Tasik Madu"	Fauziah Latiff	Adam Ahmad (2)	S. Amin Shahab	
1994	"Tanya Sama Itu Hud Hud"	M. Nasir	M. Nasir (2)	M. Nasir (3)	
1995	"Cinta Beralih Arah"	Aishah (3)	Jari	Habsah Hassan (2)	
1996	"Jerat Percintaan"	Siti Nurhaliza	Adnan Abu Hassan	Hani MJ	
1997	"Ghazal Untuk Rabiah"	M. Nasir and Jamal Abdillah	M. Nasir (5)	Cenderawasih	
1998	"Cindai"	Siti Nurhaliza (2)	Pak Ngah	Hairul Anuar Harun	
1999	"Andalusia"	M. Nasir (6)	M. Nasir (7)	Loloq	
2000	"Balqis"	Siti Nurhaliza (3)	Pak Ngah (2)	Hairul Anuar Harun (2)	
2001	"Mimpi Laila"	Yasin	Yasin (2)	Yasin (3)	
2002	"Keliru"	Nurul and Ajai	Aidit Alfian	Aidit Alfian (2)	
2003	"Bunga-bunga Cinta"	Misha Omar	Adnan Abu Hassan (2)	Adnan Abu Hassan (3)	
2004	"Rela Ku Pujuk"	Spider	Tam	Keon	
2005	"Gemilang"	Jaclyn Victor	Aubrey Suwito	Asmin Mudin	
2006	"Terlalu Istimewa"	Adibah Noor	Azlan Abu Hassan	Adibah Noor (2)	
2007	"Itu Kamu"	Estranged	Estranged (2)	Richael Lawrence	
2008	"Lagu Untukmu"	Meet Uncle Hussain	Taja, Tass & Lan	Taja (2) & Tass (2)	
2009	"Pergi"	Aizat	Pete Teo	Amran Omar	
2010	"Tolong Ingatkan Aku"	Ana Raffali	Ana Raffali (2)	Ana Raffali (3)	
2011	"Awan Nano"	Hafiz	M. Nasir (8)	Buddhi Hekayat	
2012	"Terukir di Bintang"	Aizat (2)	Yunalis Zarai	Yunalis Zarai (2)	
2013	"Bahagiamu Deritaku"	Hafiz (2)	LY	Baiduri	
2014	"Apa Khabar"	Joe Flizzow & SonaOne	SonaOne (2)	Joe Flizzow (2)	
2015	"Potret"	Akim & The Majistret	Hang Nadim	Karma Empayar	
2016	"Lelaki Teragung"	Dayang Nurfaizah	Natasyah	Iman Imran	
2017	"Jampi"	Hael Husaini	Ezra Kong & Hael Husaini (2)	Ezra Kong (2) & Hael Husaini (3)	
2018	"Haram"	Hael Husaini (4) & Dayang Nurfaizah (2)	Ezra Kong (3) & Hael Husaini (5)	Ezra Kong (4) & Hael Husaini (6)	
2019	"Sumpah"	Naim Daniel	Naim Daniel (2) & Omar K	Naim Daniel (3)	
2020	"Gila"	Kaka Azraff, Noki & Loca B	Noki & Loca B & Ezra Kong	Noki & Loca B & Ezra Kong	
2021	"Pelukan Angkasa"	SOG & Shila Amzah	Raja Nazrin Shah	Fazleena Hishamuddin	
2022	"Terus Hidup"	Aina Abdul	Aina Abdul	Aina Abdul	
2023	"Hasrat"	Amir Jahari	Amir Jahari	Amir Jahari	
2024	"Hening Rindu"	Marsha Milan Londoh	Ikhwan Fatanna & Wan Saleh	Ikhwan Fatanna	
