= Takdir Itu Milik Aku =

2024 Malaysian television series

- Promotional poster
- Genre: Melodrama; Romance; Revenge; Psychological
- Created by: Astro Malaysia
- Based on: Takdir Itu Milik Aku by Siti Rosmizah
- Written by: Wan Mahani Wan Hassan
- Directed by: Feroz Kader
- Starring: Emma Maembong; Shaheizy Sam
- Opening theme: Takdir Itu Milik Aku - Liza Hanim (Episode 1-19); Dugaan Takdir Cinta - Afif Tirmizie & Nikki Palikat (Episode 20-53)
- Ending theme: Takdir Itu Milik Aku - Liza Hanim
- Country of origin: Malaysia
- Original language: Malay
- No. of episodes: 53

Production
- Producers: Siti Rosmizah Semail; Mazelan Zainol Abidin
- Editor: Kas Roshan
- Running time: 47 minutes
- Production company: SR One Sdn Bhd

Original release
- Network: Astro Ria
- Release: February 26 – May 23, 2024

Takdir Itu Milik Aku (transl. Destiny Is Mine) is a 2024 Malaysian television series written by Wan Mahani Wan Hassan, directed by Feroz Kader, starring Emma Maembong, Shaheizy Sam, Sharifah Husna and Liza Abdullah. It premiered on Astro Ria on February 26, 2024, and airs every Monday to Thursday at 22:00 (MST).

== Synopsis ==
Dian (Emma Maembong), a marginalized young girl, feels her life invaded by the cruelty of her aunt, Kamsiah (Jasmin Hamid). Her dream of getting a higher education was destroyed in the middle of the road when she was forced to become a wage earner. However, fate brings her to meet Zarif Adha (Shaheizy Sam), the employer's grandson who pretends to be a good person. His sweet promises are just lies.

== Cast ==
=== Main ===
- Emma Maembong as Dian Zara
- Shaheizy Sam as Zarif Adha

=== Supporting ===
- Liza Abdullah as Datin Munirah
- Sharifah Husna as Azura
- Jasmin Hamid as Kamsiah
- Mustaqim Bahadon as Arman
- Fauziah Nawi as Nek Tuk Hasnah
- Mak Engku Fridah as Nek Wan Hamimah
- Nasz Sally as Maryam
- Riz Amin as Rahman
- Duerra Mitilda as Ellina
- Shakilla Khoriri as Adira
- Mahmud Alibashah as Dato Salleh
- Rayyan Mikail as Mohd Adif
- Radhi Khalid as Dollah Kutty
- Afzan A. Rahman as Zulkifli
- Manan Sulaiman as Dato Halil
- Lan Zailan as Pak Abbas
- Irfan Zaini as Alando
- Dilla Ahmad as Shima
- Norlie Tamam Idris as Puan Idayu
- Faye Kusairi as Sakinah
- Ainin Batrisya as Laila

=== Child actors ===
- Rayyan Mikail as Mohd Adif

=== Additional cast ===
- Mon Rasli as Pak Kenit
- Aishah Sudin as Mak Jah
- Alynn Techen as Minah Jamu
- Megat Terawis as Pak Akob
- Numan Charlie as Pak Tih
- Nik Ramli as Pak Bakar
- Aiman Ketot as Atan Katik
- Indhi Vernandha as Herni
- Satthiya Kandi as Kamala
- Saidah Kamarudin as Amy
- Ainina Ahmad B as Halijah
- Rashdan Baba as Dato Bahrain
- Farra Zainuddin as Leha
- Che Norizuan Che Mohamad as Munir
- Zariq Bt Mohd Fadzil Noor Rudolph as Rina
- Antasya Soman as Lili
- FZ Katek as Syamsul
- Maya Jaafar as Mrs. Asmah
- Draman as Pak Aziz
- Aayumelisa as Doctor
- Mas Idani as Nurse Linda
- Nazlinda Yusof as Kak Pah
- Izwan as a Bus Conductor

== Release ==
Astro Malaysia production team confirmed the release date which will be broadcast on February 26, 2024. It will also available to stream only on Astro GO and Sooka (Malaysian region).

== Original soundtrack ==
Released on February 16, 2024
| No. | Title | Singer | Length |
|---|---|---|---|
| 1. | "Takdir Itu Milik Aku" | Liza Hanim | 3:23 |
| 2. | "Dugaan Takdir Cinta" | Afif Tirmizie, Nikki Palikat | 4:11 |
