= Yasin Sulaiman =

Malaysian musical artist

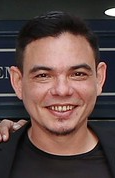

Background information
- Born: Mohamad Yasin bin Sulaiman; October 30, 1975 (age 50); Kuala Lumpur, Malaysia
- Occupations: Singer, songwriter, actor
- Instrument: Vocals
- Years active: 1995–present
- Label: Hush Entertainment
- Member of: Brothers

Mohamad Yasin Sulaiman (born October 30, 1975) is a Malaysian singer, songwriter and convicted criminal. Born to a Malay father and an Australian mother, Yasin started his career with the Malaysian nasyid group Brothers, and later went on to have a solo career before returning to his former group. In August 2024, he was sentenced to life imprisonment and 16 strokes of the cane for drug related offences.

His song, "Mimpi Laila", established his name as a singer and composer, winning the overall title at the Anugerah Juara Lagu in 2001. His second solo album Salsabila won the Best Ethnic Pop Album award at the 10th Anugerah Industri Muzik in 2003. He now focuses on his career as a publisher and songwriter. Among his popular compositions are "Wassini", "Lagu Rindu", "Ku Temu Cahaya" and "Alhamdulillah".

== Career ==
=== Brothers (1995–present) ===
Yasin was one of the earliest members of the Malaysian nasheed group Brothers during its inception in 1995 and produced two albums with the group - We Are... (1997) and Satu Perjuangan (1998). Yasin left the Brothers in 2000 to pursue his solo career and was replaced by Akbar Azmi. Yasin rejoined the group in 2005 through the Brothers Reunited album. In 2015, the group came up with fifth album, Sabar which is the fourth album of Yasin with Brothers and the last album the group recorded and released prior to the death of one of its member, Salleh Deril in October 2016 due to cardiac arrest and other diseases, leaving Yasin and two remaining members.

=== Solo career (2001–present) ===
Yasin started his solo career in 2001 with the release of his debut album, Mimpi Laila, yielded the first single of the same title. This is followed by his second album, Salsabila (2002) and the third album, Arus Qudus (2009) and singles such as "Aisyah" and "Kerna Dia".

In August 2016, he released a single, "Muzik" which got a touch of guitar by his close friend, singer Faizal Tahir. The song is available on all digital platforms such as Spotify, iTunes, KKBox, Deezer, Raku, Joox and Apple Music from August 5, 2016.

== Convicted of drug-related cases ==
On August 22, 2024, the Shah Alam High Court sentenced Yasin to life imprisonment and 16 lashes after finding him guilty of three drug-related charges. The sentencing includes eight years in prison and 10 lashes for possession of 193.7 grams of cannabis, life imprisonment and six lashes for cultivating 17 cannabis plants, and 10 months in prison for self-administration of a dangerous drug.

The sentences will run concurrently from his arrest date of March 24, 2022. This decision overturns the Petaling Jaya Sessions Court's earlier acquittal and release of Yasin, which had mandated his placement in Hospital Bahagia Ulu Kinta for treatment. Yasin’s lawyer, Ariff Azami Hussein, announced plans to appeal the decision to the Court of Appeal.

On September 2, 2026, Yasin was officially discharged from the hospital after authorities confirmed his recovery, though he remains under routine outpatient medical monitoring.

== Filmography ==
=== Film ===
Year	Title	Role	Notes
2000	Syukur 21	Daniel	First film debut
2001	No Problem	Singer	
2002	Mendam Berahi		Special appearance

=== Television series ===
Year	Title	Role	TV channel	Notes
2012	Wasiat Rindu		TV2	
