= Sekolah Menengah Kebangsaan Ibrahim =

Secondary school in Sungai Petani, Kedah, Malaysia

Ibrahim Secondary School
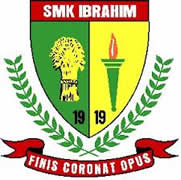
- 08000 Sungai Petani, Kedah Darul Aman, Malaysia.

Information
- Other names: SMK Ibrahim, SMKI
- Former names: Government English School, Sultan Abdul Hamid School, Sekolah Menengah Ibrahim (Ibrahim Secondary School)
- School type: National Secondary School (SMK)
- Motto: Finis Coronat Opus (The End Determines The Crown)
- Established: 1919; 107 years ago
- Session: Morning
- School code: KEB3049
- Staff: 17 (2019)
- Teaching staff: 102 (2019)
- Years: Form 1 - Form 5
- Gender: Male and Female
- Enrollment: 1052 (2019)
- Classes: 35 (Form 1 - Form 5) (7 classes per form); 10 (Form 6) (5 classes each for Upper and Lower Form 6)
- Student to teacher ratio: 10.3:1 (2019)
- Language: Malay, English
- Houses: Sultan; Sultanah; Raja Muda; Bendahara; Syed Jan
- Colours: Green; Yellow; Red
- Slogan: Ibrahim No.1
- Song: Usaha Tangga Kejayaan
- Accreditation: Cluster School of Excellence
- Yearbook: Aliran
- Alumni: Ibrahim Old Boys Association (IOBA)

Ibrahim School (Sekolah Menengah Kebangsaan Ibrahim or SMKI) is a morning session National Secondary School (SMK) in Sungai Petani, Kedah, Malaysia. It was second English school build in Kedah, after Alor Setar. The school receives royal patronage from the royal family of the state of Kedah, with the Sultan normally attending the Annual Speech and Award Presentation Day to award honours to the top academic and co-curricular achievers.

It is a co-education school which offers education level from Form 1 to Form 5 and as well as Form 6. It also provides dormitory for students who wish to reside at the school's dormitory. Students of the school are commonly referred as Ibrahimians.

== History ==
Sekolah Menengah Kebangsaan Ibrahim was established in August 1919 by Mr. E.A.G. Stuart, who was the Superintendent of Education of Kedah and Perlis, of colonial British-Malaya. The school was named Government English School. The school consisted of a longhouse with cemented floor and wooden walls, consisting of three classrooms.

Before the school was opened, Mr. Stuart invited teachers from the Government English School (now known as Sultan Abdul Hamid College), Alor Setar to hold the position of principal of the newly formed school. Tuan Syed Jan was selected to be the first headmaster.

Most of the initial students came from an Anglo Chinese school which closed down. Student qualification of the school was different from other schools. The lowest standard was known as Class Primary. Students studied two years in Class Primary which was known as Primary 1 and Primary 2 before advancing to Standard 1. Students who were bright were allowed to advance to Standard 1 after only one year in Class Primary.

In 1921 and 1922, three more teachers were sent to the school in view of the increasing number of students. The government rented a shop house in Jalan Petri to cater for this purpose..

In 1935, the school was relocated to Jalan Kolam Air, where the school currently stands and was renamed as Sultan Hamid School. The school was further renamed in 1936, in honour of Almarhum Yang Teramat Mulia Tengku Ibrahim Ibni Sultan Abdul Hamid Halim Shah, the Regent of Kedah (1913–1914).

In 1954, the school were separated between primary and secondary education.

In 2019, the school celebrate its centenary.The celebration were attended by 29th Sultan of Kedah, Sultan Sallehuddin and Sultanah Maliha.

== Principals ==
- Tuan Syed Jan Al-Jefree (1919–1946)
- Y. Bhg Dato' J.F. Augustin (1946–1953)
- Encik Lim Chien Chye (1953–1958)
- Encik Kok Swee Hong (1958–1962)
- Y.Bhg Dato' Syed Abu Bakar Barakbah (1963)
- Encik K.K Koshy (1963–1966)
- Y. Bhg Dato' G. Raja Gopal, FRGS (1967–1971)
- Encik K.K Koshy (1972–1973)
- Encik P.A Norton (1973–1975)
- Tuan Haji Yahaya B. Haji Awang, BCK (1976–1982)
- Tuan Haji Syed Ahmad b. Syed Yasin, PJK (1982–1987)
- Tuan Haji Mohamad Amin b. Abdul Rahman, PJK (1987–1993)
- Tuan Haji Atan Awang b. Abdullah (1994–1995)
- Tuan Haji Md Jaffar b. Haji Din, BCK, BKM (1995–1999)
- Tuan Haji Rosli b. Pin (1999–2004)
- Puan Hajah Haminah bt. Haji Rejab (2004–2005)
- Tuan Haji Mansor b. Lebai Habib, BCK (2005–2006)
- Encik Menteri b. Abdullah (2006)
- Encik Ramli b. Abdul Rahman (2007-2011)
- Encik Nasrudin b. Abd. Rahman (2011-2016)
- Encik Ideris bin Abd. Rahim (2016-2020)
- Tuan Haji Osman bin Omar (2020-2024)
- Tuan Zainurin bin Mat Noor (2024-2025)
- Tuan Haji Abdul Jamil bin Nazri (2025-2026)

== Academic achievement ==
Students have continued their studies at seats of higher learning, both in Malaysia e.g. University of Malaya, National University of Malaysia, Universiti Sains Malaysia, Universiti Pertanian Malaysia, Universiti Teknologi Malaysia; and around the world including top universities such as University of Cambridge, United Kingdom and Massachusetts Institute of Technology, USA.

In 2001, Ong Jin Hock were named best student nationwide for 2000's Sijil Pelajaran Malaysia (SPM) result.

In 2007, the school achieved a 100% pass rate for the Lower Secondary Examinations (Penilaian Menengah Rendah - PMR). With 113 students scoring straight A, SMK Ibrahim emerged as the second best school in Kedah and was ranked as the 10th best school in Malaysia.

In the 2007 SPM examinations, 24 students obtained 11As. One of the students, Neoh Beng Ying, scored 13 1As and was nominated as one of the top scorers in the state for this examination.

SMK Ibrahim has been awarded '5-Stars' by the Malaysian Ministry of Education in recognition of its achievement as a center of educational excellence.

== Notable students ==
- Syed Nahar Shahabuddin - 5th Menteri Besar of Kedah
- Sanusi Junid - 7th Menteri Besar of Kedah
- Ir Dr Md Noor Salleh - former vice chancellor of Universiti Pendidikan Sultan Idris
- Zakaria Kasa - former vice chancellor of Universiti Pendidikan Sultan Idris
- Dr. Ghauth Jasmon - 10th vice chancellor of Universiti Malaya
- Syed Arabi Idid - 4th rector of International Islamic University Malaysia
- Ismail Bakar - first vice chancellor of Universiti Tun Hussein Onn
- Chandra Muzaffar - Islamic reformist, former Deputy president of Parti Keadilan Nasional
- Syed Azman Syed Ibrahim - Malaysian business tycoon, founder of Weststar Aviation
- Mohamad Ariff Md Yusof - 9th Speaker of the Dewan Rakyat
- Zaki Azmi - 6th Chief Justice of Malaysia
- Syed Ahmad Idid - former High Court Judge
- Zainon Ahmad - award winning journalist, former Chief editor The Sun
- A. Kadir Jasin - former Chief editor of New Straits Times
- Shaari Isa - writer, accountant, lecturer
- K.S. Maniam - novelist
- Nassier Wahab - singer
- Maisarah Hezri - amateur golfer
