= Aizat Amdan =

Malaysian singer-songwriter

- ءايزات عامدان
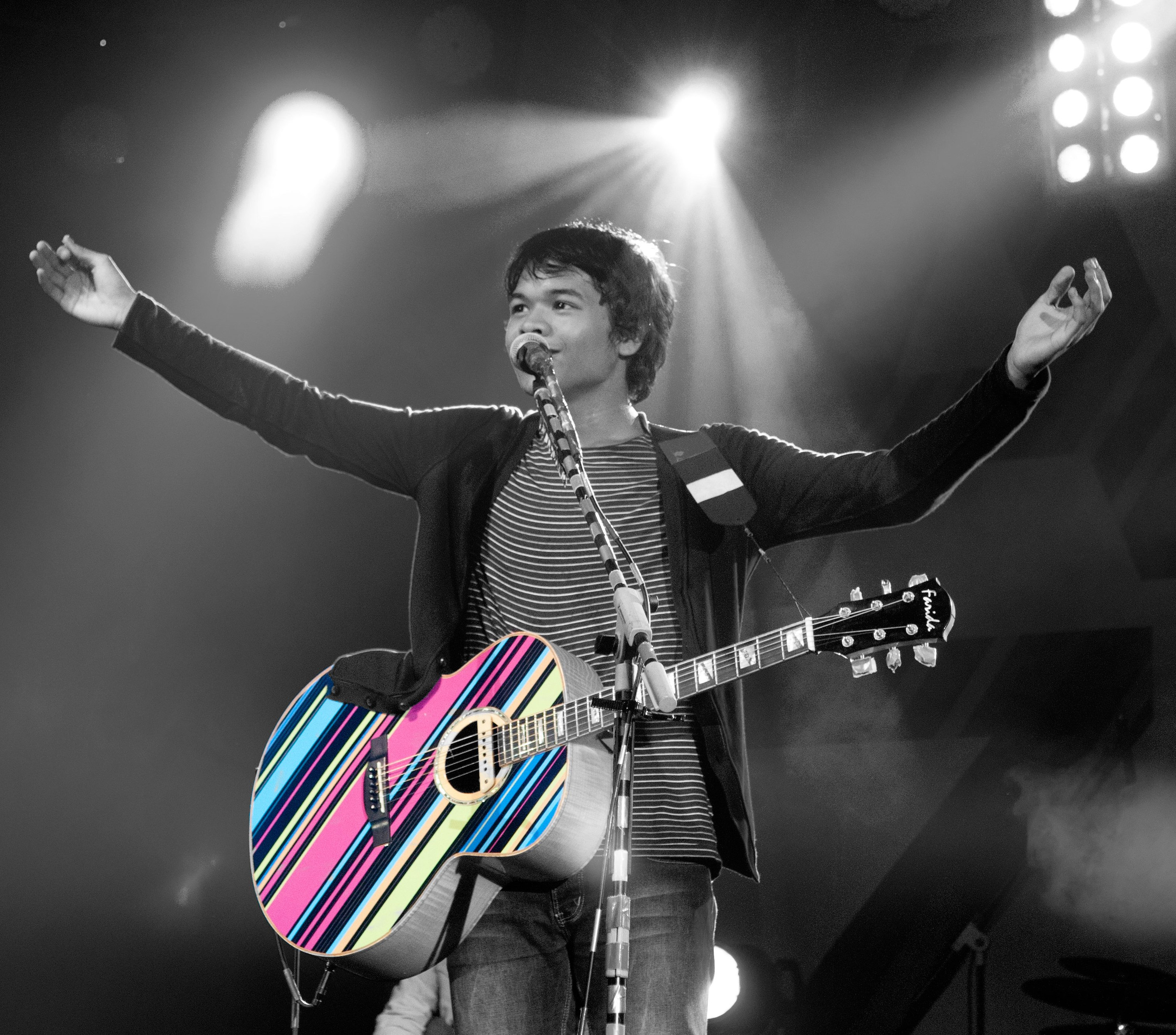
- Aizat Amdan during his Borneo Tour in 2011
- Born: Muhammad Aizat bin Amdan; 21 January 1989 (age 37); Kuala Lumpur, Malaysia
- Other names: Aizat Amdan, Ai.Z
- Occupations: Singer-songwriter, actor
- Spouse: Elyssa Alia llias (m. 2022)
- Musical career
- Genres: Folk, pop
- Years active: 2007–present
- Labels: Kasi Gegar Entertainment Sdn Bhd; Yuna Room Records

Muhammad Aizat bin Amdan (born 21 January 1989) or commercially known as Aizat Amdan, or Ai.Z, is a Malaysian singer-songwriter.

Aizat began his music career as a contestant in the 5th season of Malaysian reality TV singing contest Akademi Fantasia A while after the contest ended, Aizat surprised the Malaysian public and his fans with his new look, managing to lose 30 kg from a previous 112 kg.

Aizat is well known for inducing creative sounds and lyrical prose within his songs. He describes his music as a mixture of pop rock and alternative music influenced by Britpop.

In 2007, Aizat released two of his singles entitled "Hanya Kau Yang Mampu" and "Sahabat". "Hanya Kau Yang Mampu" was a major hit in Malaysia earning it the title of the Most Downloaded song in 2009 at Anugerah Planet Muzik. Since then Aizat has released two albums Percubaan Pertama and Urusan Aizat Amdan.

== Background ==
Aizat has been writing and singing since he was 12 years old when he first learned to play the guitar alongside his brother Anas. He played at school gigs and performed at school level competitions. He wrote the song "Lagu Kita" when he was in Form 3, which subsequently featured in Aizat's 1st album Percubaan Pertama.

== Career ==
=== 2007: Akademi Fantasia and early career ===
Upon graduating from high school, Aizat auditioned for Akademi Fantasia (or AF as it is commonly known) and was accepted as one of the final 12 contestants. His rendition of Anuar Zain's "Perpisahan" was thought to be one of the best performance of the competition. His performance of the song "Hanya Kau Yang Mampu" reached the top of local music charts. Aizat finished 7th place. His brother Amar opened the Tifo Arena with Remy in 2015.

On 7 July 2007, Aizat and his family incorporated his own production label, Kasi Gegar Entertainment Sdn Bhd (KGE). From there he has launched two albums through this label and he has organised several concerts throughout Peninsular Malaysia and Borneo.

=== 2021: Rebrand as Ai.Z ===
In 2021, Aizat rebranded and took on the stage name Ai.Z in an effort to break into the international market. His debut song, as Ai.Z, "The Last Thing", was written in collaboration with fellow Malaysian pop star, Yuna, and was released under her label, Yuna Room Records.

== Personal life ==
Aizat married his manager, Elyssa Alia Ilias, on 14 August 2022 in Puchong, Selangor. The single "Hanya Kita Dua" was dedicated to Elyssa as a pre-wedding gift.

== Discography ==
=== Studio album(s) ===
Title	Album details
Percubaan Pertama	Released: 24 June 2008; Label: Kasi Gegar Entertainment; Format: CD; Track listing: 1. "Fikirlah"; 2. "Hanya Kau Yang Mampu"; 3. "Lagu Kita"; 4. "Sahabat"; 5. "Selamat Tinggal Akhirnya"; 6. "Cintai Diriku"; 7. "Melodi Cinta"; 8. "Hanya Kau Yang Mampu (acoustic)"; 9. "Kau Aku"
Urusan Aizat Amdan	Released: 7 July 2010; Label: Kasi Gegar Entertainment, Erama Records; Format: CD; Track listing: 1. "Years From Now"; 2. "Mana Oh Mana"; 3. "Senyum"; 4. "Erti Hari Ini"; 5. "Susun Silang Kata"; 6. "Emotions"; 7. "Sungai Lui"
As Go Gerila!
Blackbox	Released: June 2013; Label: Kasi Gegar Entertainment; Format: CD, DVD, streaming; Track listing: 1. "Biso Bonar"; 2. "Perjalanan" (feat. Loque); 3. "Hadiah"; 4. "Pemergian"; 5. "#1"; 6. "Cinta Kristal"; 7. "Blackbox"
As Ai.Z
Everything In Between	Released: 14 October 2022; Label: YRR Music; Format: Streaming; Track listing: 1. "No Second Chances"; 2. "Impossible To Love You"; 3. "Catching Feelings" (with Kenny); 4. "Don't Need You"; 5. "The Last Thing"; 6. "Give A Damn"; 7. "Use Me"; 8. "Everything In Between"; 9. "Take Me Away"; 10. "Show You What Love Is"

=== EP(s) ===
- Legasi (2014)
- Live at the Theatre (2019)

=== Singles ===
==== As lead artist ====
Year	Title	Album	Notes
2008	"Sahabat"	Percubaan Pertama	
2008	"Hanya Kau Yang Mampu"	Percubaan Pertama	
2008	"Lagu Kita"	Percubaan Pertama	
2009	"Fikirlah"	Percubaan Pertama	
2009	"Pergi" / "I Go"	Talentime OST	
2009	"Kau Aku"	Merah Putih OST	
2010	"Susun Silang Kata"	Urusan Aizat Amdan	
2010	"Erti Hari Ini"	Urusan Aizat Amdan	
2010	"Sungai Lui"	Urusan Aizat Amdan	
2011	"Years From Now"	Urusan Aizat Amdan	
2011	"Mana Oh Mana"	Urusan Aizat Amdan	
2012	"Jerrypah"	Non-album singles	
2012	"In My Heart"	Non-album singles	
2012	"Denganmu"	Istanbul Aku Datang OST	
2012	"Bila Waktu Berhenti"	Istanbul Aku Datang OST	
2013	"Dwihati" (feat Yuna)	Legasi	
2013	"In Love With You" (with Noh Salleh)	Legasi	
2013	"Baru"	Legasi	
2014	"We'll Be Happy" (feat. Zee Avi)	Legasi	
2014	"Catwalk Ke Balai" (feat. Azlan & The Typewriter)	Legasi	
2014	"Kembali"	Seludup OST	
2015	"Langit Tetap Biru"	Non-album singles	
2016	"Bagai Hidup Semula"	Non-album singles	
2016	"Always With You"	Non-album singles	
2016	"Raniaku"	Non-album singles	
2017	"Jangan Menangis"	Non-album singles	
2018	"Sampai Ke Hari Tua"	Non-album singles	
2018	"Harapan Jadi Nyata"	Non-album singles	
2018	"Hari-Hariku" (feat. Intan Serah and Annabel Michael)	Gol & Gincu Vol. 2 OST	
2019	"Angin Lalu"	Non-album singles	
2019	"Waktu"	Non-album singles	
2020	"Dup Dup" (feat. Bunga)	Non-album singles	
2020	"Ku Mau" (with Hanin Dhiya)	Non-album singles	
2020	"Tekad"	Non-album singles	
2021	"Nogga" (with MonoloQue)	Non-album singles	
2021	"Mata Hati"	Non-album singles	
2022	"Ke Angkasa" (solo or remix with Anas Amdan)	Petronas 366 OST	
2022	"Hanya Kita Dua"	Non-album singles	
2023	"Hadiahkan Duka Kepadamu"	Non-album singles	
2023	"Aku Tak Perlu" (with Kenny)	Non-album singles	
As Go Gerila!
2012	"Hadiah"	Blackbox	
2013	"Perjalanan" (feat. Loque)	Blackbox	
2020	"Dandelion"	Non-album singles	
As Ai.Z
2021	"The Last Thing"	Everything In Between	
2021	"Use Me"	Everything In Between	
2022	"Impossible To Love You"	Everything In Between	
2022	"Don't Need You" (feat. Kenny)	Everything In Between	

==== As featured artist ====
Year	Title	Album
2010	"Penyelamat Cinta" (Liyana Jasmay feat. Aizat)	Non-album singles
2011	"Perpisahan Ini" (1st Edition feat. Aizat Amdan)	1st Edition
2016	"Berlari" (Aerif Azmin feat. Aizat Amdan)	Non-album singles
2019	"Urusan Seri Paduka Baginda (Agong version)" (MonoloQue feat. Aizat Amdan)	Non-album singles
2020	"Me Me We" (Ailee, Ravi and NewKidd feat. Aizat Amdan, Chillies, PAAM, Quest and Rahmania Astrini)	Non-album singles

=== Other songs ===
Year	Title	Notes
2011	"Warisan" (with Suki Low and Lawrence Soosai)	Originally by Sudirman
2011	"Di Mana Kan Kucari Ganti" (with various artists)	Astro Tribute to P. Ramlee
2013	"Tanah Air" (With Stacy, Alinda and Suki Low)	Petronas for Merdeka and Hari Malaysia 2013
2014	"Di Malam Raya" (with Amir Jahari, The Venopian Solitude and Tonawarna)	
2014	"Anak Muda Jiwa Merdeka" (with W.A.R.I.S and Elizabeth Tan)	National Civics Bureau for Merdeka 2014
2015	"Angau" (with Takahara Suiko)	Theme for Malaysia Airlines #ludangtonewcastle Campaign
2015	"Eid Is Here" (with Adam Saleh)	
2016	"Kullul Hubbi (#1Moment4Them)" (with Mu'adz Dzulkefly, Faizal Tahir and Noh Salleh)	Charity song
2017	"Terima Kasih" (with Faizal Tahir)	Media Prima 'Syukur Selalu' Campaign
2021	"Perkasakan Suara Malaysia (Terus Bersinar)"	Song for Sinar Harian
2023	"Raya Janji Happy" (with Asmidar)	

== Filmography ==
=== Film ===
Year	Title	Role	Notes
2012	Istanbul Aku Datang!	Ijoi	Debut film appearances
2013	Bola Kampung The Movie	Mat (voice)	

== Awards ==
Year	Awards	Result
2008	Anugerah Juara Lagu	Lagu Kita – Finalist
2009	Anugerah Industri Muzik	Best Vocal in a Song (Male) Award
2009	18th Discovery International Pop Music Festival in Varna, Bulgaria	Special Jury Award
2009	18th Discovery International Pop Music Festival in Varna, Bulgaria	2nd runner up Best Song Category
2009	Anugerah Planet Muzik	Best Vocal Performance in a Song by New Male Artiste
2009	Anugerah Planet Muzik	Malaysia's Most Popular Song based on Highest Download (Hanya Kau Yang Mampu)
2009	Anugerah Juara Lagu	Best Song – Pergi
2009	Anugerah Juara Lagu	Best Performance – Kau Aku
2009	Anugerah Bintang Popular	Most Popular Male Singer
2010	Anugerah Industri Muzik	Best Album Cover (URUSAN AIZAT AMDAN)
2010	Anugerah Industri Muzik	Best Music Video – Susun Silang Kata
