= Meet Uncle Hussain =

Malaysian rock band

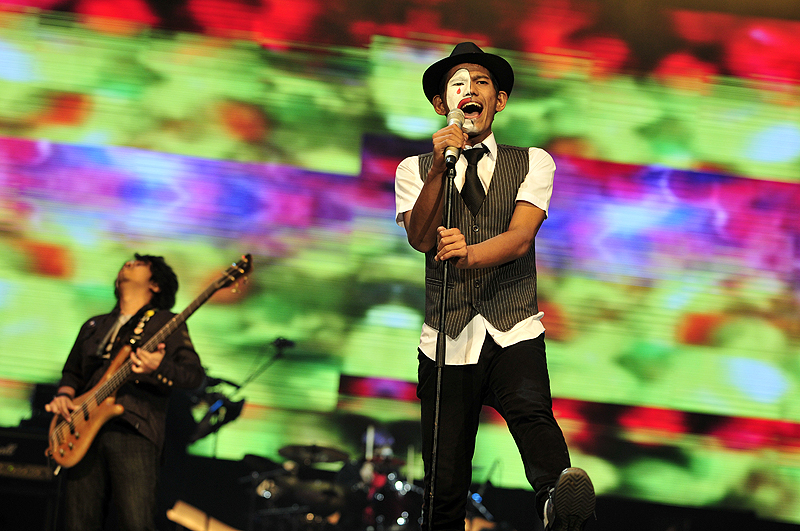

Background information
- Origin: Malaysia
- Genres: Alternative rock, Progressive rock, Indie rock
- Years active: 2001–present
- Labels: The Archive Record; Satu Music Entertainment
- Members: Bakri; Kuddux; Taja; Afat; Pitt; Babab
- Past members: Lan

Meet Uncle Hussain, also spelled as MeetUncleHussain, is a progressive rock band from Malaysia. The band's major achievements include winning the prestigious Anugerah Juara Lagu in 2008.

== Recognition ==
- Won the Pop/Rock Category at the 23rd Anugerah Juara Lagu
- Won the Best Song Award category at the 23rd Anugerah Juara Lagu
- Won the Best New Artist at the 16th Anugerah Industri Muzik

== Current members ==
- Taja – Lead Guitar
- Afat – Guitar Bass
- Babab – Guitar
- Pitt – Drum
- Bakri - Drum
- Kuddux - Drum
