= Nassier Wahab =

Malaysian singer and actor (1962–2019)

Yang Hormat Dato' Nassier Wahab DIMP SMP
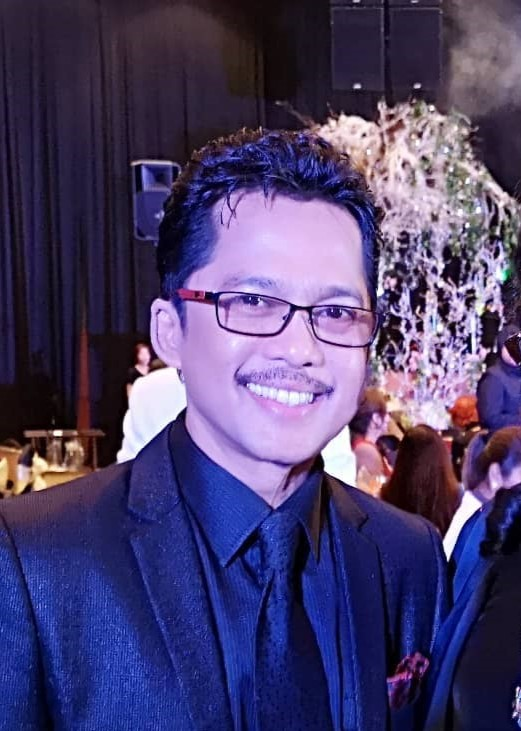
- Nassier on 2019
- Born: Mohd. Nasir bin Abd. Wahab; April 18, 1962; Kota Kuala Muda, Kedah, Federation of Malaya (now Malaysia)
- Died: December 5, 2019 (aged 57); University of Malaya Medical Centre, Pantai Dalam, Bangsar, Kuala Lumpur, Malaysia
- Resting place: Batu Belah Muslim Cemetery, Klang, Selangor
- Education: SMK Ibrahim
- Occupations: Singer, actor
- Years active: 1980–2019
- Spouse: Fatimah Abd. Raof
- Children: 1

Mohd. Nasir bin Abd. Wahab (18 April 1962 – 5 December 2019), commonly known as Nassier Wahab, was a Malaysian singer and actor. He was nominated as the popular male singer (ABPBH) in 1987 and 2004. On 15 May 2017, he was awarded the Darjah Indera Mahkota Pahang (DIMP) by the Sultan of Pahang, Ahmad Shah of Pahang, who carries the title of Dato'.

== Early life and education ==
Mohd. Nasir bin Abd. Wahab was born on 18 April 1962 in Kota Kuala Muda, Kedah. He grew up in Teluk Air Tawar, Seberang Perai Utara, Penang. He is the 12th child out of 14 siblings.

He received his secondary education at SMK Ibrahim. In an effort to advance his career, he has a certificate in Music Theory and Technology from Joseph Chamberlain College, Birmingham, United Kingdom.

== Career ==
Nassier duetted with singer Ramlah Ram for the album Sekali Aku Jatuh Cinta in November 1988 with pop rhythm and Nusantara rhythm. The album Suara Hati was published by Ramli M. S. in 1992. His 13th album is titled Ke Puncak Persada. The album Memori Cinta Luka is published by the company MCAT Sdn. Ltd. (2004).

Nassier sang in nightclubs at Royal Selangor Club, Kuala Lumpur. He once acted in Si Jantung Hati with A. R. Badul, Ibrahim Din and Faridah Fasha. In the drama Last Episode, he teamed up with actors Eman Manan and Sheila Rusly.

== Personal life ==
He married Fatimah Abd. Rauf and they had a child, Intan Najihah Nassier.

In 2008, he was admitted to the ICU and received intensive care from doctors at the Subang Jaya Medical Center (SJMC). He is said to have been injured after his house in USJ caught fire due to a short circuit. During the incident, his wife, Fatimah (then 44 years old) and his daughter, Intan Najihah (then 11 years old) were not at home.

== Death ==
He died at approximately 12:45 am on 5 December 2019 at the University of Malaya Medical Centre (PPUM) in Bangsar, Kuala Lumpur, due to gum cancer. He was laid to rest at Batu Belah Muslim Cemetery, Klang, Selangor.

== Gegar Vaganza 2015 ==
Nassier Wahab is one of the participants of Gegar Vaganza 2015.

Concert	Song (singer)	Position
Week 1	"Sekali Aku Jatuh Cinta" (Himself)	7th place
Week 2	"Kau Pergi Jua" (Adam Ahmad)	1st place
Week 3	"Kau Pergi Tanpa Pesan" (M. Daud Kilau)	2nd place
Week 4	"Jangan Ada Dusta Diantara Kita" (Broery Marantika & Dewi Yull): with Rohana Jalil	8th place
Week 5	"Di Pintu Syurga" (Dayang Nurfaizah)	4th place
Week 6	"I'll Be There" (The Jackson 5)	4th place
Week 7	"Camelia II" (Ebiet G. Ade)	2nd place
Week 8	"Biar Putih Tulang" (Dinamik)	2nd place
Last Week	"Gelombang Cinta" (Heavy Machine)	4th place
Last Week	"Ooh! La! La!" (KRU): battle Farahdhiya	4th place

== Discography ==
=== Studio album ===
1. Cinta Dan Perasaan (1985)
2. Wajah Kekasih (1986)
3. Sebuah Janji Tak Bererti (1987)
4. Sekali Aku Jatuh Cinta (1988)
5. Undangan Rindu (1990)
6. Ke Puncak Persada (2000)
7. Cinta Farhat / Airmata Dan Doa (2012)
8. Lukisan Cinta (2015)
9. Evergreen Klasik (2016)

=== Mini album ===
1. Memori Cinta Luka (2004)
2. Dunia Cinta (2018)

=== Hits songs ===
- "Bayangan Wajah Duka"
- "Sebuah Janji Tak Bererti"
- "Sekali Aku Jatuh Cinta"
- "Susah Senang Kita Bersama" (Duet Ramlah Ram)
- "Undangan Rindu"
- "Memori Cinta Luka"

== Filmography ==
=== Movie ===
Year	Title	Character	Director	Note
1987	Si Jantung	Do Kecil	M. Rajoli	The first movie
1991	Sepi Itu Indah	Zamri	Jamil Sulong	The last movie

=== Drama ===
Year	Title	Character	TV channels	Note
2006	Episod Terakhir	Lan ( Roslan )		The first and last drama

=== Television ===
Year	Title	Role	TV channels	Note
2015	Gegar Vaganza 2	Participant	Astro Ria	4th Place

== Honours and awards ==
=== Honours of Malaysia ===
- Pahang
  - Companion of the Order of the Crown of Pahang (SMP) (2009)
  - Knight Companion of the Order of the Crown of Pahang (DIMP) – Dato' (2017)

=== Awards ===
- Penang
  - Tokoh Maal Hijrah Persatuan Melayu Pulau Pinang (PEMENANG) 1438H – Tokoh Kesenian (2016)
