= Liza Hanim =

Malaysian singer and actress (born 1979)

- ليزا هانيم
- Born: Haliza Hanim binti Abdul Halim; 19 November 1979 (age 46); Klang, Selangor, Malaysia
- Education: Diploma of Business Management
- Alma mater: Sunway University
- Occupations: Singer; actress
- Years active: 1994–present
- Title: Founder, chairwoman, and owner of HANIM
- Spouse: Mohd Shahrin Shamsudin (m. 2003)
- Children: 5
- Musical career
- Genres: Pop; R&B
- Instrument: Vocals
- Labels: Laugh Out Loud Entertainment; Suria Records

Haliza Hanim Abdul Halim (born 19 November 1979) is a Malaysian singer and actress. She is one of Adnan Abu Hassan protégés and is considered one of Malaysia's best singers who dominated the music industry in the 2000s, in line with renowned vocalists such as Siti Nurhaliza, Jaclyn Victor, Dayang Nurfaizah and Misha Omar.

Liza began her career at age 15 by appearing in the Asia Bagus competition (1994). She became famous after participating in the Golden Teen Search competition organized by Radio Televisyen Malaysia (1996) and signed a contract with Suria Records in December of the same year. Liza's debut studio album, Epilog (1997), incorporated pop and acoustic elements and yielded the successful single "Getaran Cinta Dijiwa". Dimana Kan Ku Cari Ganti (1998), her second album, experimented with retro-pop and catapulted her to Malaysian stardom through the singles "Dimana Kan Ku Cari Ganti", "Istana Cinta", and "Rindu Hatiku Tidak Terkira". The album was specially recorded to appreciate the Seniman Negara, Tan Sri P. Ramlee and Biduanita Negara Puan Sri Saloma. Liza further explored pop with her third album Puteri Jelmaan (1999), which solidified her critical and commercial success.

Personal struggles influenced Liza's trap-infused fourth and fifth albums, Istimewa (2000) and Isyarat Jiwa (2001). The former won the Shanghai Asian Music Festival for Asia New Singer Competition, while being nominated for Best Pop Album and Best Vocal Performance (Female) at the 8th Anugerah Industri Muzik (2001). Isyarat Jiwa garnered three Muzik-Muzik number-two songs with "Gelisah Mimpi", "Kerana Terlalu Menyintaimu" and "Jatuh Cinta", and won the 17th Anugerah Juara Lagu for Best Vocal Award. Liza experimented with pop and R&B styles on her next albums, Ku Teruskan (2003), the latter of which being nominated for the 10th Anugerah Industri Muzik (2003) for Best Vocal Performance (Female) and won the Anugerah Era (2004) for Best Choice Music Video. Liza ventured into urban music on her seventh album, Imagin (2007), which produced the number-one singles "Merawat Luka" and "Lara".

Outside of music and film, Liza has worked with many charitable organizations. Her business ventures include HANIM. Candle, a fragrance brand launched in 2020, and a hijab line that has launched in March 2021.

== Early life ==
Liza Hanim was born on November 19, 1979, in Klang, Selangor. She is the third child in a family of three siblings to Abdul Halim and Badariah Hanum. Liza comes from a family of music lovers. Her grandfather, Abdul Razak was a violinist and had his own band, while her father was a guitarist and band singer. Her uncle, Anuar Razak is a singer from the band The Revolvers.

During her childhood, she was involved in various school activities including sports and extracurricular activities. Liza received her early education at Sekolah Kebangsaan (1) Simpang Lima, Klang, Selangor. Starting at that moment, she began to highlight her singing talent by participating in various singing competitions at the school level. She then got secondary education at Sekolah Menengah Kebangsaan Tengku Ampuan Rahimah, Klang, Selangor. Liza graduated from the Sunway University for Diploma of Business Management in August 2000.

== Career ==
She appeared in P. Ramlee The Musical as "Saloma." In 2017, she competed in the fourth season Gegar Vaganza, a reality competition aimed to seasoned singers.

In 2021, she appeared at the Astro 25 Concert. She was a judge at All Together Now Malaysia.

== Activism ==
In April 2020, Liza held a "Sing For Fund" charity program to help those affected by the Covid-19 epidemic and MCO through her company, "LH Media" in collaboration with "Live Frame". The program has seen eleven popular singers from the country join together to help those affected by the spread of the Covid-19 epidemic throughout the Movement Control Order (MCO) period. Those consisting of Aishah, Siti Nordiana, Ernie Zakri, Syamel, Haiza, Idayu, Lan Solo, Han Byul, Kai and Dini.

By watching the show on www.liveframe.my, those who watch can channel donations and be entertained with the condition of donating RM5. RM5 is the minimum amount, but you can contribute more than that. Depends on ability. According to Liza, the proceeds of the donations will be distributed to certain groups. They also work with charities in channeling these funds. However, the specialization for the groups affected during Covid-19, MCO and affected incomes also includes tradespeople and the poor.

The participating artists performed without financial compensation. Each singer recorded two songs from their home. Liza Hanim stated that the project relied on the voluntary cooperation of the performers involved.

Liza said, "This initiative came about when me, my husband and a friend at Live Frame chatted on the Zoom application. We thought of what things could be done to help the needy during this MCO. We want to donate a large amount of money and we are not able to do that. So I'm trying to use the advantages that I have by holding a program. Since I can't do anything now, even after the MCO, I can't do a concert or a big meeting. So we created a special website".

== Business and ventures ==
=== Products and endorsements ===
In 2001, for the first time Liza established her own hair salon business which has been operating in Plaza Alam Sentral, Shah Alam, Selangor.

In January 2006, she established a company, "LH Media Sdn. Bhd." which acts as the production of events such as "Corporate Launch, Corporate Carnival, Brand Activation, Family Day, Concert, Annual Dinner, Festive Celebration, Mega Event" and many more involving large-scale events. The establishment of this company was led by Liza with her husband, Mohd Shahrin.

=== HANIM ===
In July 2020, Liza launched a HANIM branded product. Scent Of Hope, is a fragrance product distributed by HANIM on December 25, 2020. The original line features four different fragrances namely Joy, Peace, Hero & Love. In March 2021, HANIM marketed their third product which is a hijab product. In the beginning, HANIM has released six collections of hijabs with different colors. The hijab product has two versions, a pom pom and a scarf. In October 2022, HANIM once again appeared by launching two products at once, it is a product in the form of a fragrance. The first product is the room spray fragrance then the second product is the candle.

== Personal life ==
=== Relationship with Mohd Shahrin Mohd Samsudin ===
After a long relationship, Liza and her fiance at the time, Mohd Shahrin who is a member of Malaysian boy band, Indigo have announced that their wedding will be held on March 21, 2003. Their marriage has received a positive response from the fans of both couples.

Liza and Mohd performed at the Kuching Waterfront, Kuching in 2000. At that time, they were both together with several artists who were involved in the success of the CATS Radio Antap Tour 2000 tour series in the main areas around Sarawak such as Miri, Bintulu, Sibu and Kuching for 10 consecutive days.

The couple first tied the knot on May 6, 2002 at Liza's family residence in Taman Sri Andalas. The wedding ceremony was held on March 21, 2003, which started at 3:30 pm, was attended by family members and close friends, including KRU Records artiste and actress Juliana Banos.

Mohd Shahrin looked dashing in a white Johor Melayu dress while Liza looked demure in a pristine white sequinned Johor Kurung dress. With just recited the lafaz nikah once in front of the kadi, Liza has legally become the wife of Mohd Shahrin. It was reported that Liza has received a dowry of RM80, nine trays of hantaran (gifts) including RM8,888.888 in cash. In return, Liza gave eleven trays.

As a result of their marriage, they have been blessed with five children namely Marsya Qistina, 22, Marissa Qaireen, 16, Mohamed Salahuddin, 14, Mohamed Ibrahim, 10 and Mohamed Al Fateh, 6. All of them inherited the talent of singing and showed interest in the field of music. Earlier, Liza's performance with her two daughters singing the song Beribu Sesalan originally sung by Ning Baizura, Shila Amzah and Jaclyn Victor went viral on social media so many were fascinated by the talent inherited by her two daughters.

== Discography ==
=== Studio albums ===
- Epilog (1997)
- Di Mana Kan Ku Cari Ganti (1998)
- Puteri Jelmaan (1999)
- Istimewa (2000)
- Isyarat Jiwa (2001)
- Ku Teruskan (2003)
- Imagin (2007)

== Filmography ==
=== Film ===
Year	Title	Role	Notes
2002	KL Menjerit	Linda Martopo	Debut film appearance
2003	Laila Isabella	Mira Kartopo	
2006	Diva Popular	Herself	Special appearance

=== Television ===
Year	Title	Role	Notes
1994	Asia Bagus	Herself	Debut television appearance.
1996	Golden Teen Search	Herself	Her second television competition where she was tested before and was later crowned as the runner-up.
1999	6th Anugerah Industri Muzik	Presenter	Categories "Best Local English New Artist" & "Best Local English Album".
1999	HMI Penghibur	Herself	Her third television show competition where she was crowned as the winner.
1999	Anugerah Sri Angkasa	Host	With Awie & Ziana Zain.
2000	Muzikal Aidilfitri Bersama Liza Hanim	Herself	A special television program in conjunction with Hari Raya Aidilfitri.
2000	Remaja Anak Malaysia: Istimewa Hari Ibu	Herself	Being on the panel with Mazibah and Mohd Zain.
2000	Bintang HMI 2000 (final)	Host	with Shamsul Ghau Ghau.
2000	Hiburan Minggu Ini: Khas Bersama Orkestra RTM	Host	with Nassier Wahab.
2000	Gendang Kencana Aidilfitri: Rajuk Perantau	Herself	Entertainment featuring a combination of actors and artists in the Hari Raya program.
2000	Hiburan Minggu Ini: Keroncong	Host	with Nassier Wahab.
2001	Jendela Pagi	Herself	Personality Segment.
2001	Konsert DiRaja Istana Negara	Host	with ND Lala.
2001	Sitkom	Herself	episode 6-10.
2001	Bintang Penghibur HMI 2001 (final)	Host	with Aznil Nawawi.
2001	Dari Studio 1	Herself	
2001	Telebriti Aidilfitri	Herself	
2002	Hiburan Minggu Ini	Herself	A one-hour show for Malaysian television station, RTM.
2002	Drama Muzikal: Riuh Sepekan	Herself	
2003	Hiburan Minggu Ini	Herself	A one-hour show for Malaysian television station, RTM.
2003	Hiburan Minggu Ini	Herself	A one-hour show for Malaysian television station, RTM.
2003	10th Anugerah Industri Muzik	Presenter	Categories "Best Vocal Performance In An Album (Male)
2004	Bintang RTM 2004	Host	She and Fazley Yaakob were chosen as hosts to replace Achik Spin & Jeslina Hashim who were previously hosts for Bintang RTM 2004.
2005	Bergaya & Berjaya	Herself	Discussing the topic of "Persistent and Successful Women".
2005	Mentor (Season 1)	Herself	A reality program where she mentors Dewi Liana Seriestha (Dewi), she and his proteges compete against different artists and their proteges.
2005	Sentuhan	Host	
2005	Zoom In Bersama Liza Hanim	Herself	
2006	Bintang Asli Remaja Kebangsaan 2006 final	Host	with Shamsul Ghau Ghau.
2006	Mentor (Season 2) | Final	Jury	The second season of Mentor where she was invited to be a Jury in the final episode.
2006	Tren-D: Syoknya Makan	Herself	
2007	Gangstarz: Minggu 2	Jury	
2007	PRTM	Herself	She and Atilia Haron promote "P. Ramlee The Musical".
2008	Bintang-Bintang: Liza Hanim	Herself	
2009	Idola Kecil (season 2): Minggu 4	Jury	
2009	Sehati Sejiwa: Liza Hanim & Shah Indigo	Herself	Talking about the celebrity story in terms of his life and artistic career.
2010	Istimewa Bersama Liza Hanim (P. Ramlee Dalam Kenangan)	Herself	
2011	Ketuk-Ketuk Ramadhan	Herself	
2017	Teh Tarik Che Ta (Series 3)	Herself	Recalling the memory of her early involvement in the Malaysian music industry.
2017	meleTOP	Herself	Finalist Gegar Vaganza 4.
2019	Hotspot	Herself	Episode 7.
2019	Unplugged Ria	Herself	
2019	Komuniti AWANI	Herself	She became the presenter of episodes (27, 28 & 30) of Komuniti AWANI.
2019	Tanya Cik Man	Herself	
2020	SELAMAT PAGI MALAYSIA	Herself	Celebrity Expressions: Aidilfitri New Norms
2020	Konsert Minggu Ini	Herself	She was the artist's turn to perform with guest artist Jaclyn Victor.
2020	Stage 104	Herself	She performed with Lah Ahmad.
2020	meleTOP	Herself	
2021	All Together Now Malaysia (season 1)	Jury	
2022	The Masked Singer Malaysia (season 2)	Herself	
2022	Karaoke Superstar	Herself	She and Syamel are guest artists for this episode.
2022	meleTOP	Herself	
2022	Nona	Herself	Throwback Artist Segment.
2022	All Together Now Malaysia (season 2)	Jury	
2023	meleTOP	Herself	
2023	Sepahtu Reunion Al Raya	Cameo	Episode: Lara Di Hati Ayah.
2023	I Can See Your Voice Malaysia (season 6)	Herself	
2023	Yang Paling Padu	Herself	She was the artist's turn to perform with Ziana Zain.
2023	meleTOP	Herself	Finalist All Stars Gegar Vaganza.
2024	Malaysia Hari Ini	Herself	promoting her first solo concert.
2024	Bintang RTM 2024	Jury	
2024	Bintang RTM 2024 (final)	Presenter	
