= Aiman Tino =

Malaysian actor and singer (born 1998)

- أيمان تينو
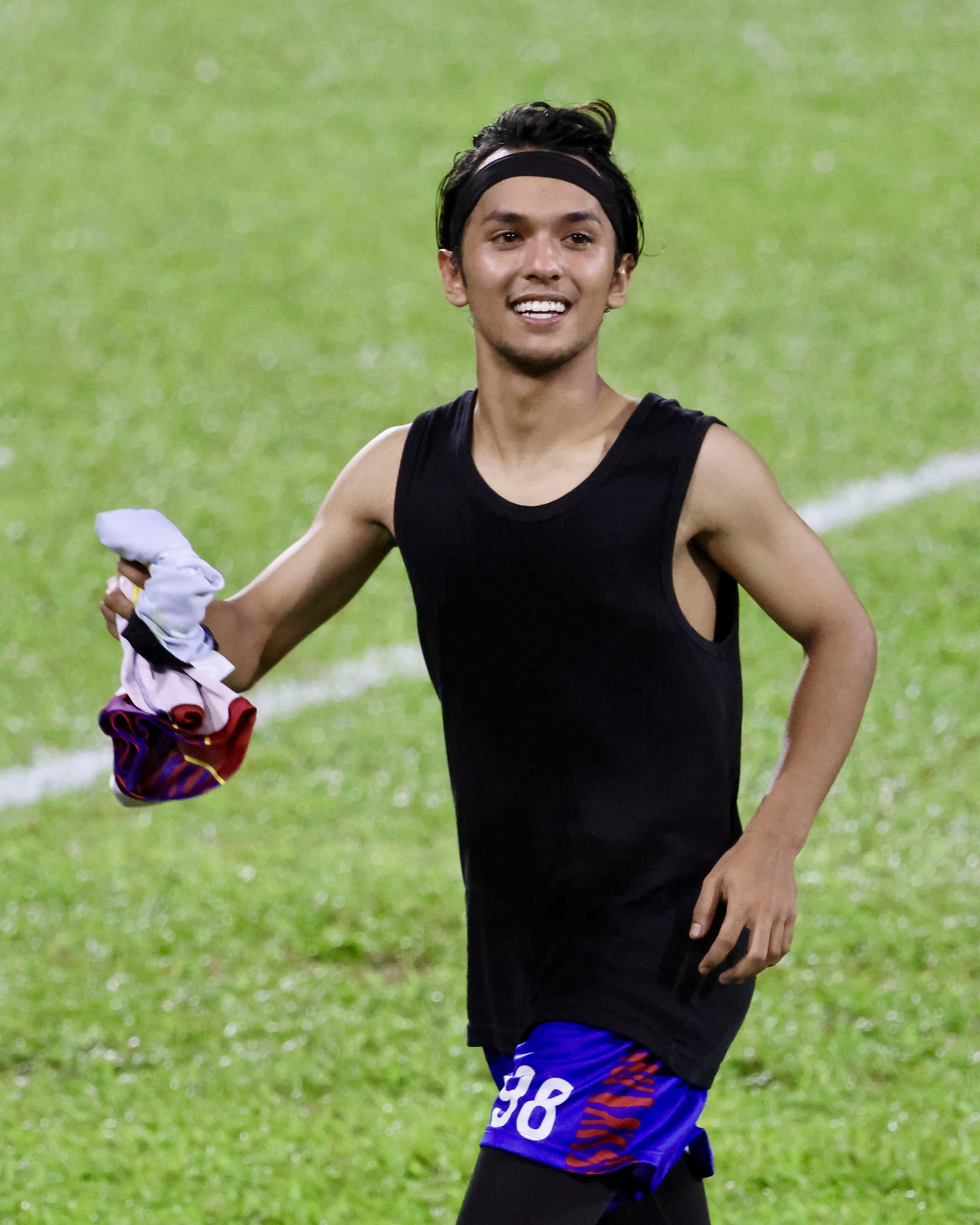
- Aiman in 2024
- Born: Mohammad Aiman bin Yusri; 27 June 1998 (age 28); Kuala Kubu Bharu, Selangor, Malaysia
- Other name: Aiman Tino
- Occupations: Actor; singer
- Years active: 2016–present
- Political party: United Malays National Organisation (since 2023)
- Spouse: Syarah Haifa (m. 2023)
- Musical career
- Genres: Pop; ballad
- Instruments: Vocals; guitar
- Label: Aries Music

Mohammad Aiman bin Yusri (born 27 June 1998), commonly known by his stage name Aiman Tino, is a Malaysian singer and actor. After the release of his debut single, Ku Rela Dibenci, he started to garner widespread recognition.

== Career ==
As soon as Aiman's single song Ku Rela Dibenci gained popularity and reached 21 million views on YouTube, it became a phenomenon and garnered recognition from fans in Malaysia. Aiman's parents, Yusri Ishak and Hazelina Mat Jalil, also wrote this song under the pen names ACK and Riena. The track also came to light to be among of the many selections made by attendees at the 2016 K-20 Award, also known as the Popular Karaoke Song Award, which is hosted by the renowned karaoke venue Red Box Karaoke Collection.

Aiman has gone by Aiman Tino, his nickname since he was a little boy. Furthermore, the Javanese singer Herman Tino captivated his mother's curiosity much. Additionally, the Aries Music organization submitted an application for him, and he is now an artist underneath the company's guidance. He performed a service by delivering the song Ku Rela Dibenci to the Putra World Trading Center in Kuala Lumpur on 22 January 2017, in honor of the song's nomination for the 31st Song Champion Award.

In 2018, Aiman made a comeback with a brand-new song called Ku Sesat Dalam Rindu, which was well received by his fan base. Apart from music, Aiman has also pursued a career in acting, appearing in plays like Mak Cun 4 and as Kumin in the drama series. He is scheduled to appear in Penunggu Simpang, a usual telefilm in the comedy category, in 2019. Directed in the 2019 Kuala Lumpur Drama Festival by Along Kamaludin.

When Aiman joined the United Malays National Organisation (UMNO) in March 2023, he was given the position of chairman of the Youth Movement Prince Bureau for the Hulu Selangor Division. He said that his father, Yusri Ishak, had previously served as the deputy head of UMNO Youth, therefore his involvement in the organisation was not unusual.

After nearly a year of pursuing the remaining balance of a debt payment owing to him in Sabah, Aiman lost patience in February 2024 and was not afraid to take the issue to court. He requested on Instagram for the public's assistance in locating the couple who are in charge of the Sabah funfair.

== Personal life ==
=== Family ===
Aiman, the fourth of ten brothers' children, was born in Kuala Kubu Bharu, Selangor, on 27 June 1998. In addition, he has an elder sister named Fara Hezel who is a singer. On 27 April 2023, he officially wed Che Syarah Haifa Che Isa at the Dewan Astana, Shah Alam. According to Aiman, the two of them had collaborated on their cookie company for four years, thus they were friends before dating.

=== Health issues ===
Aiman was supposed to have tonsillectomy on 11 October 2018, but it had to be postponed because of concern that it may damage his voice. Aiman was selected by the National Drug Agency (AADK) to be one of the six celebrities designated as anti-drug icons on 11 November 2020. After developing prolonged in 2022, he was hospitalised and advised to give up using e-cigarettes. He now counsels the general public and his fan base to give up vaping.

== Discography ==
Year	Title	Album	Notes
2016	"Ku Rela Dibenci"	Single	
2016	"Permata Cinta"	Single	
2017	"Ku Hanya Sayang Padamu"	Single	
2017	"Lara Dalam Kerinduan"	Single	Hari Raya song
2017	"Terasa Cinta"	Single	with Fara Hezel
2018	"Ku Sesat Dalam Rindu"	Single	
2018	"Terlerai Sebuah Janji"	Single	
2019	"Benci"	Single	
2020	"Dendam Simpati"	Single	
2022	"Sendiri"	Single	
2022	"Sambutlah Hari Raya"	Single	Hari Raya song
2024	"Lelah"	Single	

== Filmography ==
=== Drama ===
Year	Title	Role	TV channel	Notes
2018	Mak Cun 4	Kumin	TV3	Debut film
2019	Cerita Hantu Asrama		Astro Prima	
2021	Kampung Kolestrol	Amir	TV9	
2022	Anak Beranak Abe Yie	Muluk	TV3	
2023	Nak Dengar Cerita Hantu?	Fakir	DEGUP	

=== Telefilm ===
Year	Title	Role	TV channel	Notes
2019	Penunggu Simpang	Norman	TV3	
2019	Mak Cik Acapella	Sofjan	TV3	
2020	Validasi	Bobbi	TV3	
2020	Mak Cun 'Anjung Orang Kita'		TV3	

== Awards ==
Year	Award	Category	Decision
2017	31st Song Champion Award	Free	Nominated
2017	2017 Daily News Popular Star Award	Popular Male Singer	Nominated
2020	33rd Daily News Popular Star Award	Popular Male Singer	Nominated
2020	33rd Daily News Popular Star Award	Popular Controversy Artist	Won
