= Ahmad Nawab =

Malaysian composer (1932–2024)

Tan Sri Dato' Seri Ahmad Nawab PSM PJN DGPN DSPN SAP AMN PJK PKT
- Born: Ahmad Khan bin Nawab Khan; 6 April 1932; Pulau Pinang, Straits Settlements, British Malaya
- Died: 24 November 2024 (aged 92) Gombak, Selangor, Malaysia
- Genres: Instrumental; pop; jazz
- Occupations: Singer; composer; musician
- Instruments: Vocals; saxophone
- Years active: 1950–2024
- Labels: EMI (Singapore) Pte. Ltd. EMI (Malaysia) Sdn. Bhd. WEA Records Sdn. Bhd. MRC; BMG Music (Malaysia) Sdn. Bhd. LIFE Records; Universal Music Malaysia
- Spouse: Puan Sri Datin Seri Siti Zainab Ibrahim

Tan Sri Dato' Seri Ahmad Khan bin Nawab Khan (6 April 1932 – 24 November 2024), known professionally as Ahmad Nawab, was a Malaysian composer. He wrote over 2000 songs and worked with artists including P. Ramlee, Saloma, Uji Rashid, Sudirman, Salamiah Hassan, Datuk Andre Goh and M. Sani.

Nawab became involved in the industry in Singapore in the 1950s, 60s and then joined forces in the 1970s with Orkestra RTM in Malaysia for 17 years and received numerous awards. Among the most notable awards is the Merak Kayangan Award [Best Song], the Bintang Malam (1980). The highest appreciation given by the Malaysian music industry to the senior composer is the Seniman Negara Award of 2006, on 20 November 2006. The award was granted by the Yang di-Pertuan Agong Tuanku Syed Sirajuddin Syed Putra Jamalullail during the Anugerah Seni Negara event in 2006, organised by the Ministry of Culture, Arts and Tourism Malaysia or KeKKWa (acronym in Malay language). He also received a RM60,000 cash prize and was appointed to become the official delegate of KeKKWa in national and international forums and seminars.

Nawab was generally known for his signature sunglasses and white suit, and his performance of saxophone solos.

== Death ==
Nawab died due to old age on 24 November 2024. He was 92.
