= Rohana Jalil =

Malaysian singer (1955–2023)

- Born: Dara binti Abdul Jalil; 18 February 1955; Kota Tinggi, Johor, Federation of Malaya
- Died: 20 June 2023 (aged 68); Kuala Lumpur, Malaysia
- Occupation: Singer
- Spouse: Jahangir Khan (m. 1984–2023)
- Children: 3

Dara binti Abdul Jalil (18 February 1955 – 20 June 2023), best known as Rohana Jalil, was a Malaysian singer, whose career spanned over 40 years.

== Life and career ==
Born in Kota Tinggi, Jalil started as a wedding and club singer, and in 1979 she moved to Kuala Lumpur to pursue a professional musical career. She had her breakout winning the 1980 edition of the Radio Televisyen Malaysia singing contest Bintang RTM. In 1988, she had a massive success with the song "Rayuanku". Other hits include "Resahku", "Naluri Cinta" and "Kerana Dia Kita Terpisah". During her career she took part in several editions of the Anugerah Juara Lagu festival, ranking third in 1986 and second in 1988.

Jalil died of complications from a surgery for intestinal permeability on 20 June 2023, at the age of 68. She was the mother of the singer and actress Kilafairy.

== Discography ==
Studio albums

- Di Suatu Ketika (1982)
- Masih Dalam Ingatan (1987)
- Rayuanku (1988)
- Resahku (1989)
- Kerana Dia Kita Terpisah (1990)
- Faez (1991)
- Jangan Main Mata (1993)
- Jelingan Mata/Lembaran Baru (1995)
- Musafir Lalu (1998)
