= Not for Sale (song) =

"Not For Sale"

Single by Stacy

from the album #1
- Released: 4 April 2015
- Genre: Pop, electropop
- Length: 3:53
- Label: Warner Music
- Songwriter(s): Omar K, Mike Chan, Ahmad Abd. Rahman
- Producer(s): Omar K, Mike Chan

Stacy singles chronology
"Gila Lah!" (2014)	"Not For Sale" (2015)

"Not For Sale" is the third single released from the album #1 by Stacy, winner of the sixth season of Akademi Fantasia. The song features Malaysian rapper Altimet.

== Composition ==
The song was composed primarily by Omar K. and Audi Mok. Lyrically, its lyrics are from the perspective of a woman left at home pining for her lover, a man who provides her with luxury and finery instead of his own time. Stacy's vocal range spans from D3 to C5, consistently using her lower register for the most part of the song.

The song's second verse is a fine showcase of its theme — Stacy sings “rumah ini / hanya dipenuhi dengan bunyi / gema kasut Jimmy Choo kau beli, untuk hari jadi / yang bukan kau hantar pun sendiri“.

Altimet retorts as her male counterpart, claiming that she's the one who made it that way, using lines like “kalau berhijab ada skaf Cavalli” and “kalau not for sale kenapa masih di sini“.

== Promotion ==
Stacy promoted the song through various media outlets and shows. Her first ever live performance of this song was in Zouk, Kuala Lumpur, during the launching of the album. She heavily promoted the single through Era FM in starting from "Jelajah #SATE", the EraKustik. Shortly after that, she performed on MeleTop Era

In July 2015, she performed mash-up version of the song with Akim in Akustika Hot FM. The same version of the song was also performed in Konsert Patriot in September the same year.

Owing to the numerous votes, Stacy was invited to perform the song on MTV World Stage Live in Malaysia 2015 as the #mostwantedAct, sharing the same stage with popular international artists like Carly Rae Jepsen and Jason Derulo in September 2015. In December, she performed the song in Kota Kinabalu for #XpaxKESS organised by Era Fm.

She expressed "I’m shaking with excitement with this huge opportunity on the MTV stage. Thank you MTV and to my fans who voted me as Malaysia’s #MostWanted Act. I’ll make you proud! So come celebrate with me at MTV World Stage Malaysia 2015!” when interviewed by MTV.

== Music video ==
The official music video for this song was released on 14 August 2015 through YouTube uploaded by Astro Gempak. It has since amassed over 3.70 million views.

== Chart performances ==
"Not For Sale" debuted in Carta Era Top 40 a few weeks after its release. It subsequently rose to number 7, giving her the first Top 10 in about a year since her last single "Gilalah" in 2014. The single also peaked at No. 3 in Hot FM 30. The song also entered Muzik Muzik chart and peaking at No.1. Stacy managed to get to the final stage of the prestigious Anugerah Juara Lagu 30 with this song, marking her 7th times appearance on the stage.

Chart (2014)	Peak position
Carta Era	7
Carta Muzik Muzik	1
Carta Muzik FM	-
Carta Hot FM 30	3

== Awards and nominations ==
Year	Awards	Category	Result
2015	Anugerah Juara Lagu 30	Best Song	Nominated
2016	Anugerah Industri Muzik	Best Music Video	Won
