= Aku Stacy =

Aku Stacy may refer to:

- Aku Stacy (album), the debut album of the sixth winner of Akademi Fantasia, Stacy
  - "Aku Stacy" (song) the first single off the album
