= Stay-C =

Studio album by Stacy
- Released: 9 September 2011
- Recorded: 2011
- Genres: Pop; electropop; glam rock
- Labels: ASTRO; Warner Music

Stacy chronology
Aku Stacy (2009)	Stay-C (2011)	#1 (2014)

Singles from Stay-C
- 1. "Kisah Dongeng" Released: 6 April 2011; 2. "Kasanova" Released: 11 November 2011; 3. "Pelangi Senja"; 4. "Bosan"

Stay-C is the second album of Akademi Fantasia season 6 winner Stacy which was launched on 9 September 2011 in Malaysia. The album is produced by Astro and distributed by Warner Music.

== Track-listing ==
No.	Title	Lyrics	Music	Length
1.	"Kasanova"	Edry Abdul Halim	Edry Abdul Halim	3:43
2.	"Cemburu"	Akim AF7	KunciDemak	3:42
3.	"Bosan"	Omar K	Audi Mok, Kimberly Chin & Omar K	3:07
4.	"Lalai"	KunciDemak	KunciDemak	4:24
5.	"Kisah Dongeng"	Edry Abdul Halim	Edry Abdul Halim	3:49
6.	"Kapsul"	Zel Firdaus	Audi Mok	3:31
7.	"Gempur"	Edrie Hashim	Edrie Hashim	4:31
8.	"Pelangi Senja"	Tun Teja	Taja of Meet Uncle Hussain	3:58

== Collaboration ==
- "Gempur" is a collaboration between Stacy and Amy Search, Rock and Roll legend of the Malaysian music industry.

== Promotion ==
- Stacy performed her single, "Kisah Dongeng" in various JomHeboh Concerts (tour concerts by TV3) nationwide. She also performed at The Music, Art, Style International Festival (MASiF) 2011. Besides that, "Kisah Dongeng" was also performed on Muzik-Muzik (during the nomination stage), where she made it into semi-final round of the Anugerah Juara Lagu.
- The music video of "Kasanova" was premiered on 11/11/11 at 11 p.m. on Astro Ria. The music video features Stacy dancing with back-up dancers at various location. She also performed the song live at the 18th Anugerah Industri Muzik on 12 November 2011.
- Music video for her third single, "Pelangi Senja" was shot at Semporna, Sabah. The video was directed by Ghaz Abu Bakar and nominated for "Best Video" at the 19th Anugerah Industri Muzik.

== Awards and nominations ==
Year	Award	Category	Recipient	Outcome
2012	Anugerah Industri Muzik 19	Best Album	Stay-C	Nominated
2012	Anugerah Industri Muzik 19	Best Song Arrangement	Kasanova	Nominated
2012	Anugerah Industri Muzik 19	Best Music Video	Pelangi Senja	Nominated
2013	Anugerah Juara Lagu 27	Best Song	Pelangi Senja	Nominated
2013	Anugerah Juara Lagu 27	Best Pop Song	Bosan	Nominated
