= Number 1 (Stacy album) =

#1

Studio album by Stacy
- Released: 14 June 2014
- Recorded: 2013–2014
- Genre: Pop, R&B, electropop, dancepop
- Length: 68.40
- Label: ASTRO, Warner Music Group
- Producer: Audi Mok, Omar K, Kimberly Chin, Mike Chan & Stacy

Stacy chronology
Stay-C (2011)	#1 (2014)

Singles from #1
- 1. "Hello" Released: 4 November 2013; 2. "Gila Lah!" Released: 15 May 2014; 3. "Patah (Promotional Single)" Released: 30 September 2014; 4. "Not For Sale feat. Altimet" Released: 4 April 2015

#1 is the third studio album of Akademi Fantasia season 6 winner Stacy which was launched on 14 August 2014 in Malaysia. The album is produced by Astro and distributed by Warner Music Group as a double album. The album incorporates similar styles of music from her previous album, which includes pop and dancepop.

Stacy chose the album title because she likes the term "Number 1" and always aiming to be a winner. She enlisted popular local music producers such as Audi Mok, Kimberly Chin, Omar K. The launching of the album was held in the Zouk Club in Kuala Lumpur in a mini-concert concept.

== Production ==
Stacy collaboration with Indonesian boyband Smash in November 2013, was later added to the album. Stacy received widespread acclaim for this album with critics saying the songs are "fresh", "catchy" and of "high quality".

This album marks the first time Stacy is involved in the production of her album from the album cover to the songs and the lyrics, even directing the music video of "Gilalah". Stacy stated that the album was her gift to her loyal fans, for supporting her throughout her career.

There are 19 tracks in the album altogether, 10 of which are original and the remaining are remixes.

=== Singles ===
Majority of the singles in the album were commercially successful. The lead single peaked atop of Muzik Muzik Chart, which brought her to the prestigious stage of Anugerah Juara Lagu 29.

The second single "Patah (Broken)" served as a promotional single. Despite showing powerful vocal performance in the track, it failed to crack the music charts. The accompanying video has since been viewed over a million times.

"Not for Sale" was released as the third single, marking Stacy's return to radio top 10 charts after about a year. The song peaked at No.7 on Era.fm chart, No.3 on Hot.fm Top 30 and peaked at No.1 on Muzik Muzik Chart. The song eventually advanced to Anugerah Juara Lagu 30 in January 2016.

== Track listing ==
=== Disc 1 ===
No.	Title	Writer(s)	Length
1.	"#1"	Audi Mok, Kimberly Chin, Omar K	3.18
2.	"Gilalah"	Mike Chan, Omar K, Stacy	3:28
3.	"Jeritan"	Audi Mok, Nurfatima	4:39
4.	"Gadis Dalam Aku"	Audi Mok, Omar K	3:29
5.	"Not For Sale ft. Altimet"	Omar K, Mike Chan, Altimet	3:53
6.	"Lari"	Audi Mok, Kimberly Chin, Omar K	4:13
7.	"Patah"	Kimberly Chin, Omar K	4:28
8.	"Paranormal"	Mike Chan, Omar K, Zel Hadauan	3:33
9.	"Tertanya"	Un Numb	3:51
10.	"Hello ft SMASH"	Audi Mok, Kimberly Chin, Omar K, Inu Numata	3:15

=== Disc 2 ===
Disc 2 consists of the remix version of her the songs from Disc 1. The remixes were produced by wide range of producers and DJ's including Audi Mok, dJcybersonique, Kimberly Chin, Ezra Kong and famous rapper Sonaone.

== Awards and nominations ==
Year	Award	Category	Nominated work	Result
2014	21st Anugerah Industri Muzik	Best Album Cover	#1	Won
2015	29th Anugerah Juara Lagu	-	"Gilalah"	Nominated
2016	30th Anugerah Juara Lagu	-	"Not For Sale"	Nominated
2016	22nd Anugerah Industri Muzik	Best Music Video	"Not For Sale"	Won
