= Akademi Fantasia season 4 =

Akademi Fantasia
- Season 4
- Hosted by: Aznil Nawawi
- Judges: Adlin Aman Ramlie
- Winner: Mohammad Faizal Ramly
- Runner-up: Lotter P. Edwin Edin
- Finals venue: Putra Indoor Stadium

Release
- Original network: Astro Ria
- Original release: 3 June – 5 August 2006

Season chronology
- ← Previous; Season 3 Next → Season 5

The fourth season of Akademi Fantasia premiered on the Astro Ria television channel on 3 June 2006. The season introduced Adlin Aman Ramlie as a replacement for Kudsia Kahar, while Aznil Nawawi returned as host once again. On 5 August 2006, a native of Marang, Terengganu, Mohammad Faizal Ramly won the season, defeating runner-up Lotter P. Edwin Edin. Faizal remained the last male winner until the seventh season.

As much as 20 short-listed contestants were revealed in Tirai Akademi Fantasia, which was aired on 20 May 2006. However, all contestants were required to perform in the Prelude Concert in order to determine the final 12 contestants who would move on to the main competition in which 10 contestants would be chosen by the jury and the remaining two contestants by the audience's votes.

The weekly concerts were held in MBPJ Civic Hall while the final concert was held in Stadium Putra Bukit Jalil. This season also witnessed an elimination of a student in the first concert, an Akademi Fantasia first. The entire season attracted as much as 7.4 million votes.

== Concert Summaries ==
=== Week 1 ===
Original Airdate: 3 June 2006

Student	Song
Amirul no.1	"Dengar Ini Cerita" by Anita Sarawak
Diddy no.2	"Aduh Sayang" by P. Ramlee & Saloma
Faizal no.3	"Ingin Tahu" by P. Ramlee & Sanisah Huri
Farhan no.4	"Hujan Di Tengahari" by H.M Rohaizad
Haziq no.5	"Tidurlah Permaisuri" by Jamal Abdillah
Karen no.6	"Malam Pesta Muda-Mudi" by Saloma
Lotter no.7	"Azizah" by P. Ramlee
Nora no.8	"Perwira" by Saloma
Rich no.9	"Ai Ai Twist" by P. Ramlee
Salima no.10	"Apa Guna Berjanji" by Saloma
Velvet no.11	"Darah Muda" by Saloma
Zila no.12	"Jangan Tinggal Daku" by P. Ramlee

- Bottom two: Nordawati Daud & Velvet Laurence Aduk
- Eliminated: Nordawati Daud
- Special judges: Ahmad Fauzee & Hajah Wan Chik Daud

=== Week 2 ===
Original Airdate: 11 June 2006

Student	Song
Amirul no.1	"Fiona" by 4U2C
Diddy no.2	"Lonely No More" by Rob Thomas
Faizal no.3	"Semalam Yang Hangat" by Wings
Farhan no.4	"Sayang Di Sayang" by Kartina Dahari
Haziq no.5	"Kian" by Mawi
Karen no.6	"Kerna Terpaksa" by Francissca Peter
Lotter no.7	"Ibu Kota Cinta" by Def Gab C
Rich no.9	"Dendang Remaja" by A.Romzi
Salima no.10	"Kushiyon Aur Gham" by Udit Narayan & Anuradha Paudwal
Velvet no.11	"Langit Ke Tujuh" by Sharifah Zarina
Zila no.12	"Jika Kau Kekasih" by Linda AF2

- Bottom two: Karen Tan Lee Suan & Richael L. Gimbang
- Eliminated: Karen Tan Lee Suan
- Special judges: Bob Lokman & Francisca Peter

=== Week 3 ===
Original Airdate: 18 June 2006

Student	Song
Amirul no.1	"Yesterday" by The Beatles
Diddy no.2	"Memori Luka" by Headwind
Faizal no.3	"Blues Terengganu Kita" by Iklim
Farhan no.4	"Still Got the Blues" by Gary Moore
Haziq no.5	"Cinta Nusantara" by Sheqal
Lotter no.7	"Iris" by Awie
Rich no.9	"Mustika" by M. Nasir
Salima no.10	"Obsesi" by Juliana Banos
Velvet no.11	"Teman Tapi Mesra" by Ratu
Zila no.12	"Tak Tercapai Akalmu" by Elyana

- Bottom two: Nor Salima Habibi & Richael L. Gimbang
- Eliminated: Richael L. Gimbang
- Special judges: Deja Moss & M. Rajoli

=== Week 4 ===
Original Airdate: 24 June 2006

Student	Song
Amirul no.1	"Khatulistiwa" by Blues Gang
Diddy no.2	"Nusantara" by Kembara
Faizal no.3	"Wo!" by Zahid
Farhan no.4	"Tak Ingin Lagi" by Misha Omar
Haziq no.5	"Buat Sang Puteri" by Spider
Lotter no.7	"Bertemasya Desa Gemalai" by Ramli Sarip
Salima no.10	"Senandung Hidup Berbudi" by Ramli Sarip
Velvet no.11	"Dikir Puteri" by Noraniza Idris
Zila no.12	"These Boots Are Made For Walking" by Nancy Sinatra

- Bottom two: Nor Salima Habibi & Nur Azilah Seeron
- Eliminated: Nur Azilah Seeron
- Special judges: Harun Salim Bachik & Noraniza Idris

=== Week 5 ===
Original Airdate: 1 July 2006

Student	Song
All	"Serasi Bersama" by Ajai & Nurul
Amirul no.1	"Zaman" by S.M Salim & Ramli Sarip
Diddy no.2	"Biar Betul" by Akar
Faizal no.3	"Terharu" by Sweet Charity
Farhan no.4	"Biarlah Rahsia" by Siti Nurhaliza
Haziq no.5	"Juwita Citra Terindah" by M. Nasir
Lotter no.7	"Bila April" by Fazley
Salima no.10	"Because of You" by Kelly Clarkson
Velvet no.11	"Sangkar Cinta" by Ziana Zain

- Bottom two: Nor Salima Habibi & Syamsul Hirdy Muhid
- Eliminated: Nor Salima Habibi
- Special judges: Cik Mat Poi & Juliza Adlizan

=== Week 6 ===
Original Airdate: 8 July 2006

Student	Song
All	"To Sir With Love" by Lulu "Angguk-Angguk Geleng-Geleng" by Ahli Fikir
Amirul no.1	"Sedang Ingin Bercinta" by S.M Salim & Ramli Sarip
Diddy no.2	"Air Mata Kasih" by R.Azmi & Kamariah Ahmad
Faizal no.3	"Senandung Anak Laut" by Kembara
Farhan no.4	"Kopi Dangdut" by Fahmi Shahab
Haziq no.5	"Seruan" by Left-handed
Lotter no.7	"Da' Bomb" by Ruffedge
Velvet no.11	"Run Baby Run" by Sheryl Crow

- Bottom two: Amirul Azwan Mohd. Ghazali & Syamsul Hirdy Muhid
- Eliminated: Syamsul Hirdy Muhid
- Special judges: Adnan Abu Hassan & Raja Azura

=== Week 7 ===
Original Airdate: 15 July 2006

Student	Song
All	"Saya Anak Malaysia" by Dr. Sam "Hips Don't Lie by Shakira featuring Wyclef Jean "Lemas" by Ruffedge
Amirul no.1	"Oh No Kamu" by V.E
Faizal no.3	"Dealova" by Once Dewa
Farhan no.4	"Meniti Titian Usang" by Search
Haziq no.5	"Tak Seindah Wajah" by Tan Sri S.M Salim
Leez	"Ku Gembira Disampingmu" by Khatijah Ibrahim
Lotter no.7	"Chow Kit Road" by Sudirman
Velvet no.11	"Caramu" by Nikki Featuring Zahid AF2

- Bottom two: Hazwan Haziq Rosebi & Lotter P.Edwin Edin
- Eliminated: Lotter P.Edwin Edin
- Special judges: Edry KRU & Siti Nurhaliza

=== Week 8 ===
Original Airdate: 22 July 2006

Student	Song
All	"Bila Rindu" by Ruffedge "Aku Sudah Jatuh Hati" by Norshiela amin
All Girl	"Cinta" by Melly Goeslaw & Kris Dayanti
Amirul no.1	"Jatuh" by Adam AF2
Faizal no.3	"Smells Like Teen Spirit" by Nirvana
Farhan no.4	"Emosi" by Sheila Majid
Haziq no.5	"I Need To Know" by Marc Anthony
Velvet no.11	"Penantian" by Harmoni

- Bottom two: Amirul Azwan Mohd. Ghazali & Hazwan Haziq Rosebi
- Eliminated: Amirul Azwan Mohd. Ghazali
- Special judges: Datin Seri Tiara Jacquelina & Siti Hajar Ismail

=== Week 9 ===
Original Airdate: 29 July 2006

Student	Song
All	"Hujan" by Uji Rashid & Hail Amir "Tanda Kasih" by Uji Rashid & Hail Amir
All Girl	"Hendak Ku Tanya Terasa Malu" & "Berilah Kasih Sayang" by Uji Rashid
Amirul no.1	"Kurniaan Cinta" by Adi AF1
Diddy no.2	"Diari Seorang Lelaki" by Pretty Ugly
Karen no.6	"Jejaka Idaman" by Raja Ema
Lotter no.7	"Pria Terhebat" by Sheila On 7
Nora no.8	"Berpaut Di Dahan Cinta" by Dayangku Intan
Rich no.9	"The Reason" by Hoobastank
Salima no.10	"Nour El Chams" by Pascale Machaalani
Zila no.12	"Bisikan Hati by Siti Nurhaliza

- Bottom two: Hazwan Haziq Rosebi & Velvet Laurence Aduk
- Eliminated: None
- Student who was recruited: Lotter P.Edwin Edin
- Special judges: Liza Hanim & Sharifah Shahirah

=== Week 10 ===
Original Airdate: 5 August 2006

Student	Song
Faizal no.3	"Hujan" by Sudirman "Lihatlah" - Composed by M. Nasir, Lyrics by Loloq
Farhan no.4	"Spain" by Al-Jarreau "Aku Sahaja Yang Tahu" - Composed by Ajai, Lyrics by Ajai/Fauziah Nawi
Lotter no.7	"In The End" by Linkin Park "Yang Berlalu.... Tak Berulang" - Composed by Neves Pretty Ugly, Lyrics by Loloq
Haziq no.5	"Cubit-Cubit Sayang" by Dato' M.Daud Kilau "Gurindam Anak Muda" - Composer & Lyrics by Ramli Sarip
Velvet no.11	"Rembulan" by Kris Dayanti "Kini Detiknya" - Composed by Sharon Paul, Lyrics by Fedtri Yahya

- Fifth: Velvet Lawrence Aduk
- Fourth: Hazwan Haziq Rosebi
- Third: Nur Farhan binti Azizan
- Runner-Up: Lotter P.Edwin Edin
- Winner: Mohammad Faizal Ramly
- Special judges: Mamat Khalid & Siti Hajar Ismail

== Students ==
(ages stated are at time of contest)

Student	Age	Hometown	Out
Nordawati "Nora" Daud	21	Sandakan, Sabah	no.8
*Karen Tan Lee Suan	22	Kota Bharu, Kelantan	no.6
Richael L. Gimbang	25	Penampang, Sabah	no.9
Nur Azilah Seeron	19	Jempol, Negeri Sembilan	no.12
Nor Salima Habibi	19	Ipoh, Perak	no.10
Syamsul Hirdy "Diddy" Muhid	22	Kuala Lumpur	no.2
Amirul Azwan Mohd. Ghazali	19	Kuching, Sarawak	no.1
Velvet Lawrence Aduk	20	Penampang, Sabah	no.11
Hazwan Haziq Rosebi	19	Kluang, Johor	no.5
Nur Farhan Azizan	22	Kuala Lumpur	no.4
Lotter P.Edwin Edin	25	Membakut, Sabah	no.7
Mohammad Faizal Ramly	23	Marang, Terengganu	no.3

== Post Akademi Fantasia Careers ==
- Richael L. Gimbang signed with EAD Entertainment and became the main vocalist of music band Estranged. In 2006, his band won the award Favourite Band at ERA Award. His group also won Best Rock and Best Video at Motorola Malaysian English Top 10.
- Nur Azilah Seeron has released her first album in 2006, Realiti.
- Syamsul Hirdy Muhid also known as Diddy Hirdy has his duet single released with Yanie entitled Saling Terpesona. Released his first album in 2007 and "Hilang" is in the top charts of all radio stations. Nominated for Anugerah Planet Muzik 2008 for Best New Male Artist, Anugerah Bintang Popular 2007 for Most Popular New Male Artist, Finalist for Anugerah Era 2007[Favorite Male Vocal, Favorite Duo Vocal (Saling Terpesona), Favorite Pop Song (Hilang) and Most Promising Artist].
- Hazwan Haziq Rosebi appeared in several concerts organized by Istana Budaya and Ministry of Culture, Art & Heritage in Kuala Lumpur, and Jakarta.
- Nur Farhan Azizan was nominated in several prestigious award in Malaysia such as in 2007 ERA Award for Favorite Female Vocal; 2007 Planet Music Award for Best New Female Artist; and also 2007 Anugerah Industri Muzik for Best New Artist and Best Vocal in Album. She has also recorded a theme song for Malam Sehati Berdansa in Astro Ria, and also a theme song for a serial drama Cinta & Keadilan entitled Kau Cinta.
- Mohammad Faizal Ramly was chosen as the Ambassador for Mamee slurp in 2006. He released his first album Datanglah in 2007.
- Leez Rosli Though only admitted for a week as guest participant. She later began her career in acting in Astana Idaman. Released her single " merah itu cinta " and joining KLTV hyppinspirasi as tv host.
- Lotter Petrus Edwin Edin he formed his own group consisted of his siblings known as The Divine Master. With single " Di Sampingmu" gained regular airplay amongst local radio station.
- Shaz Despite not being selected to 12 contestant Shahz still continued his pursuit of glory. He later released his single independently. Shahz died in 2021 of a bacteria infection.

== Summaries ==
=== Elimination chart ===
Voting Result In Rank Order
Order	Weekly Concert										
Order	Prelude	1	2	3	4	5	6	7	8	9	10
1	Diddy	Faizal	Lotter	Farhan	Farhan	Farhan	Farhan	Farhan	Farhan	Faizal	Faizal
2	Karen	Lotter	Faizal	Faizal	Haziq	Haziq	Faizal	Faizal	Faizal	Farhan	Lotter
3	Lotter	Amirul	Farhan	Haziq	Faizal	Faizal	Haziq	Velvet	Velvet	Velvet	Farhan
4	Farhan	Salima	Amirul	Lotter	Velvet	Lotter	Lotter	Amirul	Haziq	Haziq	Haziq
5	Velvet	Farhan	Haziq	Velvet	Lotter	Amirul	Velvet	Haziq	Amirul	Lotter	Velvet
6	Rich	Karen	Salima	Amirul	Amirul	Velvet	Amirul	Lotter			
7	Salima	Haziq	Velvet	Zila	Diddy	Diddy	Diddy				
8	Haziq	Diddy	Zila	Diddy	Salima	Salima					
9	Zila	Rich	Diddy	Salima	Zila						
10	Faizal	Zila	Rich	Rich							
11	Nora	Velvet	Karen								
12	Amirul	Nora									

The student won the competition
The student was the runner-up
The student was the first runner-up
The students were finalists
The student was eliminated
The student was the original eliminee but was saved
The students were voted by the audience to enter the competition
The student was re-entered into the competition through AFMASUK

- In Week Prelude, the pool of 20 contestants were reduced to 12 who moved on to the main competition as the new AF students. However, this first call-out does not reflect their performance that first week. Additionally, Nora and Amirul were voted by the audience through SMS to enter the competition.
- In Week 9, there was no elimination. Additionally, Lotter was re-entered into the competition after scoring the highest votes through AFMASUK.

== Cast members ==
=== Host ===
- Aznil Nawawi

=== Professional Trainers ===
- Ramli Sarip – Academy Principal
- Ajai – Vocal Presentation
- Fauziah Nawi – Drama Presentation
- Corrie Lee & Linda Jasmine – Choreographer
- Shamril Saleh – Music Director
- Dr. Fazley Yaacob – Motivation Consultor
- Kevin Zahri – Health Consultor
- Shafizawati Sharif – Technical Vocal

=== Judge ===
- Adlin Aman Ramlie

== Season Statistics ==
- Total number of students: 12
- Oldest students: Lotter P.Edwin Edin & Richael G. Limbang, both 25 years old
- Youngest students: Amirul Azwan Mohd. Ghazali, Hazwan Haziq Rosebi, Nor Salima Habibi, & Nur Azilah Seeron, all 19 years old
- Tallest student: Syamsul Hirdy Muhid, 6'0" (183 cm)
- Shortest student: Karen Tan Lee Suan
- Heaviest student: Velvet Lawrence Aduk 147.7 lb (67 kg)
- Top 3's vote mean (excluding finale): Mohammad Faizal Ramly – 2.0, Lotter P.Edwin Edin – 3.74, Nur Farhan Azizan – 1.78
- Top 3's vote median (excluding finale): Mohammad Faizal Ramly – 2, Lotter P.Edwin Edin – 4, Nur Farhan Azizan – 1
- Student with the most consecutive highest votes: Nur Farhan Azizan, 6 times
- Student with the most collective highest votes: Nur Farhan Azizan, 6 times
- Students with the most consecutive bottom two appearances: Hazwan Haziq Rosebi & Nor Salima Habibi, both 3 times
- Students with the most collective bottom two appearances: Hazwan Haziq Rosebi & Nor Salima Habibi, both 3 times
- Students with no bottom two appearances: Mohammad Faizal Ramly & Nur Farhan Azizan
