= Riz (singer) =

Malaysian singer (born 1986)

Mohd Idris bin Mohd Zaizizi (born 19 December 1986), better known by his stage name Riz, is a Malaysian singer. He rose to fame after becoming a runner-up in the sixth season of the hit Malaysian Talent reality show, Akademi Fantasia.

== Akademi Fantasia ==
In 2008, Riz went to audition for Akademi Fantasia in Kuala Lumpur singing, It's gonna be me by 'N Sync but his audition was not aired. He performed Kasih Berubah in front of the judges during the introduction round, With his pleasant vocal and huge talent, Riz succeeded to the next round.

His previous attempt to make himself known in the music industry began in 2004 when he auditioned for Akademi Fantasia, Season 2. Then he auditioned for Malaysian Idol. He only made it until the top 50. RIZ never gave up hope. He tried again in another singing competition. Only this time, he joined a vocal group and that was also short-lived. In 2007, he came back to audition for Akademi Fantasia, Season 5 but only passed until the third stage. In 2008, with great enthusiasm, he came back stronger and more prepared to audition for Akademi Fantasia, Season 6 till he was crowned as runner-up of the show on 25 May 2008.

The songs RIZ sang on the show were:

- Audition: It's gonna be me by Nsync
- Introduction round: Kasih berubah by Ferhad and Pergi tuk kembali by Ello
- Week 1: Ketulusan Hati by Anuar Zain
- Week 2: Separuh Masa by the lima
- Week 3: Dari Sinar Mata: BPR
- Week 4: Marabahaya : Pop Shuvit
- Week 5: Time is running out: Muse
- Week 6: Memburu Impian: Kaza
- Week 7: Seribu Tahun: Imran Ajmain
- Week 8: Laskar Cinta: Dewa
- Week 9: Rock Around The Clock and Endless Love
- Final Week: 11 Januari and Hanya Sandiwara (new single)

== Discography ==
Studio Album

Bermula Semula (2009)

- "Hanya Sandiwara"
- "Harus Ku Yang Pergi"
- "Bermula Semula"
- "Ku Pinjam Satu Bintang" (Solo Vers.)
- "Kau Wanita"
- "Kehilangan Kamu"
- "Cinta Ini"
- "Khilaf"

== TV appearances ==
RIZ made an appearance in the current BOH TEA TV ad, a collaboration between Astro and Boh for AF winner and first runner-up.

RIZ was invited to perform live at Festival Filem Malaysia, one of the most prestigious movie award show in Malaysia.

At times, Riz also appeared on Aku Stacy, a TV program made for the champion of Akademi Fantasia.

== Filmography ==
Year	Title	Role	Note
2008	Trek Selebriti	Riz (himself)	Main Role
2008	Aku Stacy	Riz (himself)	guest appearance
2008	Camp Rock the Movie (Malay Version)	Shane Gray	Main Role (voice)
