= Pakai Buang =

Single by Stacy

from the album Aku Stacy
- Released: 9 May 2009
- Recorded: 2008
- Genre: Electropop
- Length: 3:37
- Label: Maestro Talents Sdn. Bhd.
- Songwriter(s): Edry KRU
- Producer(s): Edry KRU

Stacy singles chronology
"Gagap" (2008)	"Pakai Buang" (2009)

"Pakai Buang" is a song by Malaysian pop singer Stacy taken from her first studio album, Aku Stacy which was fully composed and written by Edry KRU.

The song serves as the album's third single and it has been released to radio stations on 9 May 2009 and has received significant airplay since then.

== Background ==
It has been rumoured that the third single of the album was the teary ballad "Cinta Yang Ku Duga". However, Stacy has stated in an interview with mStar that "Pakai Buang" is her third single of the album.

== Release ==
=== Promotion ===
Stacy has previously performed the song during the road tour of Anugerah Bintang Popular 2008 across Malaysia, along with her hit singles "Aku Stacy" and "Gagap". As part of the single's promotion, Stacy also performed the song on Muzik Muzik on 14 May 2009 and also in the grand finale of the seventh season of Akademi Fantasia on 16 May 2009.

== Charts ==
Chart (2009)	Peak position
Carta Era	1
Carta Hot FM 30	4
Carta Muzik FM	5
Carta Muzik Muzik	1
