= Aku Stacy (album) =

Studio album by Stacy
- Released: 9 March 2009
- Recorded: 2008
- Genre: Pop, electropop, rock, dance-pop
- Label: Maestro Records, Warner Music
- Producer: Freddie Fernandez, Ajai, Audi Mok, Edry KRU, Kieran Kuek

Stacy chronology
Aku Stacy (2009)	Stay-C (2011)

Singles from Aku Stacy
- 1. "Aku Stacy" Released: 25 May 2008; 2. "Gagap" Released: 27 December 2008; 3. "Pakai Buang" Released: 9 May 2009

Aku Stacy is the eponymous debut album of Akademi Fantasia season 6 winner Stacy which was released on 9 March 2009 in Malaysia under Maestro Records and Warner Music.

Aku Stacy included two live performances that were taken from Stacy's performance in Akademi Fantasia which are "Cinta Khayalan" and "Aku Stacy". The song "Cinta Khayalan" was originally recorded by Bob AF2 under the title "Cinta Terhalang".

== Album information ==
Following her coronation as the winner of the sixth season of Akademi Fantasia, Stacy was very busy with her schedule. Nevertheless, in late 2008, Stacy has stated that she is working on her debut album during media interviews, and worked with several composers such as Ajai, Audi Mok and Edry KRU.

She began recording for her new materials throughout July until December 2008. Her recording stopped for a while to give ways for her to be prepared for the semi-final of Anugerah Juara Lagu. Stacy has also stated that this album will feature "pop dance" genre.

== Singles ==
=== "Aku Stacy" ===
"Aku Stacy" was the first single from the album. It was released as the coronation single for Stacy as the sixth winner of Akademi Fantasia. The song was written by newcomer Intan Norul Azlina and Laila Ismail. It became Stacy's first number 1 single in Carta Era for two weeks. The single also managed to go into the final round of Anugerah Juara Lagu in Pop Rock category.

=== "Gagap" ===
The album's second single, "Gagap", premiered in the finale of second season Sehati Berdansa. The song becomes Stacy's second single that manages to reach Top 5. To date, the song has peaked at number 2 in Carta Era. The single also reaches top 5 in other charts - peaking at number 5 in Carta Hot FM 30, as well as peaking at number 4 in Carta Muzik FM.

=== "Pakai Buang" ===
"Pakai Buang" is the third single of the album. Stacy has stated in interview with mStar that the song, composed and written by Edry KRU, will be chosen as her third single of the album. The single was released on 9 May 2009 to radio stations and has gained significant airplay since then. It debuted at #10 at Carta Muzik FM and has slowly climbing the chart. To date, it is peaking at #5. In Carta Muzik Muzik, the song is currently peaking at #4.

== Track listing ==
No.	Title	Writer(s)	Length
1.	"Aku Stacy"	Intan Shaharuddin, Layla Ismail	2:50
2.	"Gagap"	Kieran Kuek, Mode	3:49
3.	"Pakai Buang"	Edry KRU	3:37
4.	"Cerah"	Audi Mok, Nurfatima	2:58
5.	"Cinta Yang Ku Duga"	Ajai	4:44
6.	"Aku Stacy (Live version)"	Intan Shaharuddin, Layla Ismail	2:55
7.	"Cinta Khayalan (Live version)"	Sharon Paul, Shimy	3:44
