= Permata Irama =

Compilation album by Siti Nurhaliza
- Released: 10 December 2007
- Genre: Pop, traditional non-western music
- Label: Suria Records
- Producer: Dato' Siti Nurhaliza, Pak Ngah, S. Atan, Yassin & Suflan Faidzal

Singles from Permata Irama
- 1. "Cindai"; 2. "Balqis"; 3. "Nirmala"; 4. "Hati Kama"

Permata Irama is the special compilation album by Malaysian pop singer-songwriter Dato' Siti Nurhaliza which was released on sometimes around the year, 2008 before the released of Lentera Timur.

== History ==
Although we had never even heard about the news reporting that Siti will be releasing a compilation album on that year, Suria Records finally released the traditional compilation album which combined all the biggest ethnic hits songs by Siti such as "Balqis", "Cindai", "Hati Kama" her duet with the renowned singer Noraniza Idris and plus the rare song that usually included in any of Siti's traditional album, her duets with Tan Sri Dato SM Salim in "Pandang-Pandang, Jeling-Jeling" & "Bergending Dang Gong" where the later one composed by Pak Ngah and lyrics penned by Siso.

The most anticipated ethic compilation album spawned other haunting tunes such as "Badarsila", "Ya Maulai", "Nirmala" & "Lagu Rindu" the only song composed by Yassin himself. This album is a must have for all the lovers of Siti's creative ethnic albums as it had the collections of all Siti's greatest hits ethnic songs including the ones that rarely can be found on her other albums. Most of the songs are dominated by composers such as Pak Ngah, S.Atan & many others and many of the songs are recognised and winning many awards here and abroad.

== Track listing ==
#	Title	Songwriter(s)
1.	"Lagu Rindu"	Yassin
2.	"Pandang-Pandang Jeling-Jeling"	S. Atan, Tan Sri Dato SM Salim
3.	"Cindai"	Pak Ngah, Hairul Anuar Harun
4.	"Balqis"	Pak Ngah, Hairul Anuar Harun
5.	"Badarsila"	Suflan Faidzal, Lokgha
6.	"Hati Kama"	Pak Ngah, Hairul Anuar Harun
7.	"Bergending Dang Gong"	Pak Ngah, Siso
8.	"Ya Maulai"	Pak Ngah, Hairul Anuar Harun
9.	"Nirmala"	Pak Ngah, Ce'kem
10.	"Joget Berhibur"	Rahim Jantan, Siso
11.	"Kurik Kundi"	Pak Ngah, Nurul Asyiqin
12.	"Sakti"	Mohar, Loloq

This album features 12 greatest traditional songs in Siti's credit and are arranged according to the popularity of these songs by fans.
