= Akademi Fantasia season 5 =

Season of the Malaysian reality television series

Akademi Fantasia
- Season 5
- Hosted by: Aznil Nawawi; Linda Onn
- Judges: Fauziah Latiff; Hattan; Fauziah Ahmad Daud
- Winner: Norsyarmilla Jirin
- Runner-up: Ebi Kornelis @ Firdaus Yaimal
- Finals venue: Putra Indoor Stadium

Release
- Original network: Astro Ria
- Original release: 17 March – 19 May 2007

Season chronology
- ← Previous; Season 4 Next → Season 6

The fifth season of Akademi Fantasia premiered on 17 March 2007 and ran until 19 May 2007. The season was joined by new judges, Fauziah Latiff, Hattan and Fauziah Ahmad Daud, who replaced Adlin Aman Ramlie, while Aznil Nawawi returned as host for his fifth season. On 19 May 2007, Norsyarmilla Jirin from Penang was crowned the winner of the fifth season of Akademi Fantasia, making her the first female winner, defeating runner-up Ebi Kornelis @ Firdaus Yaimal. This season also featured Aizat Amdan, who would subsequently become the overall winner of 2009 and 2012 Anugerah Juara Lagu.

For this season, Akademi Fantasia was held from March to May, unlike the previous four seasons which were held between May and August because the producer did not want the show to clash with Malaysia's 50th Anniversary of Independence Day.

Throughout this season, as much as 6.6 million votes were cast, with 1.9 million votes received in the finale.

== Concert summaries ==
=== Week 1 ===
Original Airdate: 17 March 2007

Student	Song
Afiq no.1	"Janjiku" by Sofaz
Aizat no.2	"Pangeran Cinta" by Dewa 19
Candy no.3	"Ka-Ching!" by Shania Twain
Dafi no.4	"Uptown Girl" by Westlife
Dekna no.5	"Tanpamu" by Farawahida
Diya no.6	"Aku Masih Setia" by Dia Fadila
Ebi no.7	"Milik Siapakah Gadis Ini" by Sudirman Arshad
Farha no.8	"Balada Pemuzik Jalanan" by Search
Fatin no.9	"Angkat Kaki" by Sheeda
Heliza no.10	"Kau Pergi Jua" by Adam Ahmad
Mila no.11	"Bersamamu" by Siti Sarah
Noni no.12	"Tak Ada Logika" by Agnes Monica
Rizal no.13	"Menanti Sebuah Jawapan" by Padi
Shawal no.14	"Harapan" by Fazli Zainal
Zana no.15	"Akhirnya Kini Pasti" by Anita Sarawak

- Bottom two: Adyana Khalid & Ebi Kornelis
- Eliminated: Adyana Khalid
- Quit: Wan Nurul Zhana Wan Mohd Hanizan

=== Week 2 ===
Original Airdate: 24 March 2007

Student	Song
Afiq no.1	"Biso Bonar" by Hattan
Aizat no.2	"Basket Case" by Green Day
Aswad no.3	"Nak Kahwin Tak Ada Duit" by Sweet Charity
Candy no.4	"Semua Jadi Satu" by 3 Diva
Dafi no.5	"Pencinta Wanita" by Irwansyah
Dekna no.6	"Cinta" by Amy Mastura
Ebi no.7	"Bailamos" by Enrique Iglesias
Farha no.8	"Biarkan Aku Menangis" by Tommy J. Pissa
Fatin no.9	"Bila Rindu Kusebut Namamu" by Siti Fairuz
Heliza no.10	"Aku Bukan Untukmu" by Rossa
Mila no.11	"Gotta Tell You" by Samantha Mumba
Noni no.13	"Miraei" by Kiroro
Rizal no.12	"Kembali Merindu" by Slam
Shawal no.14	"Kenangan Mengusik Jiwa" by A. Ramlie

- Bottom two: Mohd Syafiq Mohd Ramadzan & Norsyarmilla Jirin
- Eliminated: Mohd Syafiq Mohd Ramadzan
- Special guest: Mr. Yamada @ Abdul Rahsid Abdullah

=== Week 3 ===
Original Airdate: 1 April 2007

Student	Song
Aizat	"Warisan" by Sudirman
Aswad	"Hijau Bumi Tuhan" by XPDC
Candy	"Terlalu Istimewa" by Adibah Noor
Dafi	"Aku Tanpa Cintamu" by Mirwana
Dekna	"Kembara Di Tanah Gersang" by Al Jawaher
Ebi	"Al Jannah" by Mawi
Farha	"Insan" by Yantzen
Fatin	"Erti Hidup" by Dayang Nurfaizah
Heliza	"Melodi Ahlan" by Waheeda
Mila	"Melukut Di Tepi Gantang" by Aishah
Noni	"Ode to My Family" by The Cranberries
Rizal	"Permaidani" by Aris Ariwatan
Shawal	"Ku Berlari" by Firdaus

- Bottom two: Aryanna Najwa Ahmad & Norsyarmilla Jirin
- Eliminated: None

=== Week 4 ===
Original Airdate: 7 April 2007

Student	Song
Aizat	"La Camisa Negra" by Juanes
Aswad	"Hakikat Sebuah Cinta" by Iklim
Candy	"Setia Kukorbankan" by Fauziah Latiff
Dafi	"Zikir Kasih" by Amir Ukays
Dekna	"Salam Untuk Kekasih" by Nadia
Ebi	"Kasihnya Laila" by Jinbara
Farha	"As Long As You Love Me" by Backstreet Boys
Fatin	"Joget Gila Bayang" by Anita Sarawak
Heliza	"Torn" by Natalie Imbruglia
Mila	"Benci Tapi Rindu" by Diana Nasution
Noni	"Pastikan" by Siti Nurhaliza
Rizal	"Di Ambang Sore" by Ahmad Jais
Shawal	"Izinkanku Pergi" by Kaer Azami

- Bottom three: Mohd. Farha Jasmen, Nonny Nadirah Zainuddin & Nurul Fatin Yahya
- Eliminated: Mohd. Farha Jasmen, Nonny Nadirah Zainuddin & Nurul Fatin Yahya
- Special judge: Prof. Madya Khairil Johari Johar

=== Week 5 ===
Original Airdate: 15 April 2007

Student	Song
All	"Aankhein Khuli" by OST - Mohabbatein
Aizat	"Itu Kamu" by Estranged
Aswad	"60's TV" by OAG
Candy	"Berdua Lebih Baik" by Acha Septriasa
Dafi	"Bibir Mesra Jiwa Parah" by Zam Zam
Dekna	"Unfaithful" by Rihanna
Ebi	"Layu Sebelum Berkembang" by Broery Marantika
Heliza	"Diam Diam Jatuh Cinta" by Ramlah Ram
Mila	"Puncak Kasih" by Ziana Zain
Rizal	"Pada Syurga Di Wajahmu" by Nash
Shawal	"Cinta Tak Karuan" by Amigos

- Bottom two: Aryanna Najwa Ahmad & Hasfarizal Ayub
- Eliminated: Aryanna Najwa Ahmad
- Special judge: Syafinaz

=== Week 6 ===
Original Airdate: 21 April 2007

Student	Song
All Boys	"Awas" by KRU
All Girls	"Tamparan Wanita" by Elite
Aizat	"Perpisahan" by Anuar Zain
Aswad	"Yang Sedang-Sedang Saja" by Iwan
Candy	"Gadis Dan Bunga" by Rahimah Rahim
Dafi	"Qing Fei De Yi" by Harlem Yu
Ebi	"Jujur" by Radja
Heliza	"Nafas Cahaya" by Misha Omar
Mila	"Drama" by Ning Baizura, Nikkie & Yanie
Rizal	"That Thing You Do" by The Wonders
Shawal	"Peronda Jaket Biru" by Awie (Wings)

- Bottom two: Hasfarizal Ayub & Mohd Shawal Ruslan
- Eliminated: Hasfarizal Ayub
- Special judge: Kudsia Kahar

=== Week 7 ===
Original Airdate: 28 April 2007

Student	Song
All	"Joget Pahang" by Siti Nurhaliza "Joget Si Pinang Muda" by Noraniza Idris
Aizat	"Ada" by M. Nasir
Aswad	"Penyu Menangis" by Sudirman
Candy	"Tari Silat Melayu" by Aishah
Dafi	"Joget Angan Tak Sudah" by Jay Jay
Ebi	"Berdendang Dalam Tangisan" by Jamal Abdillah
Heliza	"Rindu Merindu" by Fauziah Idris
Mila	"Dondang Dendang" by Noraniza Idris
Shawal	"Joget Kaki Lima" by Dahlan Zainuddin

- Bottom two: Mohd Shawal Ruslan & Muhammad Aizat Amdan
- Eliminated: Muhammad Aizat Amdan
- Special judge: Salih Yaacob

=== Week 8 ===
Original Airdate: 5 May 2007

Student	Song
All	"Boria AF5"
All Girls	"Joget Lambak" by Adam
All Boys	"Wajah Rahsia Hati" by Fauziah Ahmad Daud
Aswad	"Korban Cinta" by Aris Ariwatan
Candy	"Perhaps Perhaps Perhaps" by Lila Downs
Dafi	"It's Gonna Be Me" by 'N Sync
Ebi	"Kisah Kau Dan Aku" by Alleycats
Heliza	"Kesal" by Ella
Mila	"Aku Takkan Bersuara" by Nike Ardilla
Shawal	"Kaulah Segalanya" by Hazrul Nizam

- Bottom two: Gadaffi Ismail Sabri & Mohd Shawal Ruslan
- Eliminated: Gadaffi Ismail Sabri
- Special judge: Loloq

=== Week 9 ===
Original Airdate: 12 May 2007

Student	Song
All	"Let's Dance Together" by Melly Goeslaw "Lagu Gembira" by Ning Baizura & Jamal Abdillah
Aswad	"Mungkin Langitmu Lebih Biru" by Mawi "Joget Cinta Sakti" by Haziq & Rosma (Duet with Heliza)
Candy	"Cahaya Cinta" by Siti Nurhaliza "Menari Denganku" by Zahid & Siti Sarah Raisuddin (Duet with Shawal)
Ebi	"Bukan Diriku" by Samsons "My Heart" by Acha Septriasa & Irwansyah (Duet with Mila)
Heliza	"Ya Atau Tidak" by Erra Fazira "Joget Cinta Sakti" by Haziq & Rosma (Duet with Aswad)
Mila	"Pudar" by Rossa "My Heart" by Acha Septriasa & Irwansyah (Duet with Ebi)
Shawal	"Copacabana" by Barry Manilow "Menari Denganku" by Zahid & Siti Sarah Raisuddin (Duet with Candy)

- Bottom two: Mohd Shawal Ruslan & Nur Heliza Helmi
- Eliminated: Mohd Shawal Ruslan
- Special judges: Loloq & Siti Nurhaliza

=== Week 10 ===
Original Airdate: 19 May 2007

Student	Song
Aswad	"Mata, Hati, Jiwa" by Awie "Bila Mati Cinta Terhenti" - Composed by Razman Riza, Lyrics by Loloq
Candy	"Dedebu Cinta" by Misha Omar "Demam" - Composer & Lyrics by Edry Abdul Halim
Ebi	"Farhana (Puteri Bumi Kenyalang)" by Jinbara "Sinar Cinta" - Composer by M. Nasir, Lyrics by Loloq
Heliza	"Cinta Boneka" by D-Va "Cinta Di Lautan Lalang" - Composed by Aidit Alfian, Lyrics by Loloq
Mila	"Cinta Pura Pura" by Ezlynn "Persis Mutiara" - Composed by Ajai, Lyrics by Loloq

- Fifth: Candra Clement
- Fourth: Nur Heliza Helmi
- Third: Muhammad Nur Aswad Jafar
- Runner-Up: Ebi Kornelis @ Firdaus Yaimal
- Winner: Norsyarmilla Jirin
- Special judge: Mamat Khalid

== Students ==
(ages stated are at time of contest)

Student	Age	Hometown	Rank
Wan Nurul Zhana Wan Mohd Hanizan	23	Kuala Lumpur	16th (quit)
Adyana "Diya" Khalid	21	Kuala Lumpur	15th
Mohd Shafiq Mohd Ramadzan	21	Putrajaya	14th
Nurul Fatin Yahya	20	Johor Bahru, Johor	13th
Mohd. Farha Jasmen	22	Kota Kinabalu, Sabah	12th
Nonny Nadirah "Noni" Zainuddin	18	Kota Marudu, Sabah	11th
Aryanna Najwa "Dekna" Ahmad	19	Penang	10th
Hasfarizal Ayub	19	Kuching, Sarawak	9th
Muhammad Aizat Amdan	18	Kuala Lumpur	8th
Gadaffi "Dafi" Ismail Sabri	19	Petaling Jaya, Selangor	7th
Mohd Shawal Ruslan	23	Kuala Lumpur	6th
Candra "Candy" Clement	18	Tambunan, Sabah	5th
Nur Heliza Helmi	21	Kuala Terengganu, Terengganu	4th
Muhammad Nur Aswad Jafar	27	Penang	3rd
Ebi Kornelis @ Firdaus Yaimal	23	Kota Kinabalu, Sabah	Runner-up
Norsyarmilla "Mila" Jirin	19	Penang	Winner

== Summaries ==
=== Voting result ===
Voting Result in Rank Order
Order	Weekly Concert									
Order	1	2	3	4	5	6	7	8	9	10
1	Dafi	Dafi	Ebi	Ebi	Ebi	Ebi	Ebi	Aswad	Mila	Mila
2	Heliza	Heliza	Dafi	Dafi	Aswad	Mila	Aswad	Mila	Aswad	Ebi
3	Aizat	Aswad	Aizat	Heliza	Shawal	Candy	Mila	Ebi	Ebi	Aswad
4	Fatin	Aizat	Heliza	Aizat	Heliza	Aswad	Candy	Heliza	Candy	Heliza
5	Aswad	Ebi	Aswad	Aswad	Dafi	Aizat	Dafi	Candy	Heliza	Candy
6	Farha	Fatin	Candy	Candy	Mila	Heliza	Heliza	Shawal	Shawal	
7	Rizal	Candy	Farha	Shawal	Aizat	Dafi	Shawal	Dafi		
8	Candy	Dekna	Shawal	Dekna	Candy	Shawal	Aizat			
9	Shawal	Shawal	Rizal	Rizal	Rizal	Rizal				
10	Afiq	Rizal	Fatin	Mila	Dekna					
11	Dekna	Noni	Noni	Noni						
12	Noni	Farha	Dekna	Farha						
13	Mila	Mila	Mila	Fatin						
14	Ebi	Afiq								
15	Diya									
16	Zana									

The student won the competition
The student was the runner-up
The student was the first runner-up
The students were finalists
The student(s) won the best performance
The student won the best performance but was eliminated
The students did not participate in the concert
The student was the original eliminee but was saved
The student was eliminated
The student quit the competition

- In week 1, Zana quit the competition a day prior to the first concert.
- In week 3, there was no elimination. The accumulated votes were forwarded to the following week.
- Week 4 featured a multiple elimination, the first and only in the history of Akademi Fantasia.
- In week 6, the 'button system' was introduced in the concert to deem which student(s) did the best performance, an Akademi Fantasia first. Multiple students won best performance:
  - In week 6, Aizat, Candy and Mila won
  - In week 7, Aizat and Candy both won, but despite this, Aizat was eliminated after receiving the lowest votes at the end of the concert.
  - In week 8, Aswad, Candy, Heliza and Mila all won.
  - In week 9, Ebi, Heliza and Mila all won.
  - In the finale, Mila was deemed the best performer in both of her performances.

== Cast members ==
=== Hosts ===
- Aznil Nawawi - Weekly Concert & Diaries
- Linda Onn - Special Debate

=== Professional trainers ===
- Roslan Aziz - Principal & Music Director
- Shafizawati Sharif - Vocal Technical
- Adnan Abu Hassan - Vocal Presentation
- Linda Jasmine - Choreographer
- Dr. Azahari Othman - Motivator
- Fatimah Abu Bakar - Stage Presentation
- Khairul Najmi - English Language
- Jasmi Rejab - Fashion Stylist

=== Judges ===
- Fauziah Latiff
- Hattan
- Fauziah Ahmad Daud

== Season statistics ==
- Total number of students: 16
- Oldest student: Muhammad Nur Aswad Jafar, 27 years old
- Youngest student: Candra Clement, Muhammad Aizat Amdan & Nonny Nadirah Zainuddin, all 18 years old
- Tallest student: Mohd Farha Jasmen, 6'0.4" (184 cm)
- Shortest student: Norsyarmilla Jirin, 4'8.6" (148 cm)
- Heaviest student: Muhammad Aizat Amdan 216 lb (98 kg)
- Lightest student: Norsyarmilla Jirin & Nurul Fatin Yahya, both 89 lb (40 kg)
- Student with the most consecutive best performance: Candra Clement, 3 times
- Students with the most collective best performance: Norsyarmilla Jirin, 4 times
- Top 3's vote mean (excluding finale): Norsyarmilla Jirin - 7.0, Ebi Kornelis - 3.33, Muhammad Nur Aswad Jafar - 3.22
- Top 3's vote median (excluding finale): Norsyarmilla Jirin - 6, Ebi Kornelis - 1, Muhammad Nur Aswad Jafar - 3
- Student with the most consecutive highest votes: Ebi Kornelis, 5 times
- Student with the most collective highest votes: Ebi Kornelis, 5 times
- Student with the most consecutive bottom two appearances: Mohd Shawal Ruslan, 4 times
- Student with the most collective bottom two appearances: Mohd Shawal Ruslan, 4 times
- Students with no bottom two appearances: Candra Clement & Muhammad Nur Aswad Jafar
