= Menjelma =

Studio album by Kaer Azami
- Released: February 2007
- Genre: Pop
- Length: 44:20
- Label: Sphinx Flame
- Producer: Kaer Azami (Executive producer), Audi Mok, Azlan Abu Hassan, Omar K, Mohariz Yaakup

Professional ratings
Review scores
Source	Rating
ERA	link

Menjelma is the first studio album from Malaysian pop singer-songwriter Kaer Azami which was released in February 2007 in Malaysia, Singapore and Brunei. The album features 11 tracks altogether including one bonus track ("Kembali Bersama"), which Kaer first recorded it in a compilation album of Akademi Fantasia season 2. The first single from this album is "Izinku Pergi".

== Track listing ==
#	Title	Songwriter(s)	
1.	"Menjelma"	Audi Mok, Kaer Azami	3:57
2.	"Izinku Pergi"	Azlan Abu Hassan, Sulusarawak	4:08
3.	"Ku Tak Ingin Bebas"	Audi Mok, Ad Samad	3:44
4.	"Sinar Cahaya"	Audi Mok, Kaer Azami	4:28
5.	"Apabila"	Omar K	3:42
6.	"Dalam Kenangan"	Azlan Abu Hassan, Ucu	4:13
7.	"Kau Telefon Lagi"	Reezam/Mohariz Yaakup	3:53
8.	"Hilangnya Cinta"	Kaer Azami	4:53
9.	"Mama Said"	Audi Mok	3:15
10.	"Seribu Impian"	Aubrey Suwito, Teesh RS	4:15
11.	"Kembali Bersama 2004 (Bonus Track)"	Johan Farid Khairuddin, Faris	3:52

== Charts ==
=== Singles ===
Year	Single	Chart	Peak Position
2007	"Izinku Pergi"	Carta ERA, Muzik Muzik	1
