= Gagap =

Single by Stacy

from the album Aku Stacy
- Released: 27 December 2008
- Genre: Dance-pop; electropop
- Length: 3:49
- Label: Maestro Talents Sdn. Bhd.
- Songwriter(s): Kieran Kuek, Mode
- Producer(s): Kieran Kuek

Stacy singles chronology
"Aku Stacy" (2008)	"Gagap" (2008)	"Pakai Buang" (2009)

"Gagap" (translation: Stutter) is a song written and produced by Kieran Kuek with lyrics by Mode for Stacy's debut album, Aku Stacy (2009). It was released on 27 December 2008 as the second single from the album.

== Single release ==
Despite her busy schedules to be fully prepared for the Anugerah Juara Lagu, Stacy performed "Gagap" in the season finale of Sehati Berdansa. She also performed the song in her shows throughout Malaysia in order to promote the song. The song deals with the issue of unfaithfulness. Its lyrics talks about a relationship turns sour in which the persona is questioning the cause behind her lover's sudden of change. When all is said and done, she finally finds out that her lover is cheating on her behind her back.

== Track listing ==
1. "Gagap [Studio Version]" – 3:49
- Composed : Kieran Kuek
- Lyric : Mode

== Chart performance ==
The song debuted on Carta Era at #11, peaking at #2 as it was being held back by Alyah's "Tak Mungkin Kerna Sayang". To date, the song has spent more than 25 weeks in the chart, making it one of the songs that stays in the chart for a long period of time. In Hot FM 30, the song debuted at #17 and is steadily climbing the chart. It managed to peak at #5 before finally exiting of chart. The song also entered Muzik FM at #10 and managed to peak at #4. In Carta Muzik Muzik, the single managed to peak at #2 and being held off by Adam's "Benar-Benar". However, the song exited the chart for being disqualified for unknown reason.

Chart (2008)	Peak position
Carta Era	2
Carta Muzik FM	4
Carta Hot FM 30	5
Carta Muzik Muzik	2
