= Masyhur =

Studio album by Noraniza Idris
- Released: June 1, 1998
- Recorded: November 1997 – May 1998
- Studio: Pro Recording Studio
- Genre: Ethnic pop
- Length: 50:17
- Label: Suria Records
- Producers: Tan Su Loke (executive); Pak Ngah; S. Atan

Noraniza Idris chronology
Ala Dondang (1997)	Masyhur (1998)	Bekaba (1999)

Singles from Masyhur
- 1. "Dikir Puteri" Released: June 1, 1998; 2. "Zapin Pusaka" Released: July 19, 1998; 3. "Joget Berkias Kasih" Released: September 14, 1998; 4. "Dondang Dendang" Released: November 7, 1998

Masyhur is the eighth studio album by Malaysian singer, Noraniza Idris. It was released on 1 June 1998 by Suria Records. Written and produced by Pak Ngah and S. Atan, Masyhur is an Irama Malaysia album with influences of ghazal and zapin music, featuring inang, gambus, joget, rodat, masri, and dikir barat and asli. The album, which featured the dikir barat-themed song "Dikir Puteri", was popular in Malaysia and neighbouring Thailand, where it became the album's biggest hit.

== Background ==
After the release of the album Ala Dondang, his career ambitions finally began to materialise, receiving much positive reception from the Malaysian public and growing an ever-increasing fanbase among all communities, thanks to his performances of authentic Malaysian-rhythm songs. After that, he wanted to release his next album, which would explore how songs could be delivered to a wide audience of all ages, be more widely accepted and eventually become even more popular among people in neighbouring countries, and even overseas, not just in Malaysia. He also considered how the songs could be presented in a way that felt more vibrant and spirited, and how they could be so catchy that listeners would never tire of them, no matter how many times they were played. From this, the album Masyhur was born, which features a broader range of elements: not only a strong traditional musical instrument component but also the inclusion of modern instruments that complement one another, with both then being fused together.

== Album summary ==
Masyhur enriches our cultural heritage and our mother tongue. Each song on the album is presented in a variety of traditional musical styles, including Zapin, Ghazal, Inang, Gambus Zapin, Joget, Asli Inang, Rodat, Masri, Dikir Barat and Asli. Noraniza has also immortalised a gurindam that, whilst well known by name, is rarely heard in its original rhythm. On this occasion, Noraniza has once again collaborated with Pak Ngah to produce songs based on the Dikir Barat and Rodat styles, such as "Dikir Puteri" and "Dondang Dendang". Also contributing to this album are S. Atan, Ahmad Jusoh, Fadzil Ahmad, Anak Sarawak, and Kazar Saisi.

The album was a huge success commercially and achieved a high position on the music charts, earning it the Best Ethnic Pop Album award and a nomination for Best Album at the 1999 Anugerah Industri Muzik. The album released the song "Dikir Puteri" as its first single, which was nominated at Muzik Muzik, and then went straight through to the Muzik Muzik 1998 Semi-Final. and went on to the final of the Juara Lagu awards (Anugerah Juara Lagu), as well as winning the 'Best Performance' award at the 1998 Juara Lagu Awards. Not only that, the song "Dondang Dendang" was also nominated to compete in Muzik Muzik, and was then performed live in the 1999 Muzik Muzik Semi-Final until it finally qualified for the final round of the Juara Lagu Awards and won the 'Best Performance' award for the second time at the 1999 Juara Lagu Awards (Anugerah Juara Lagu 1999).

== Track listing ==
No.	Title	Writer(s)	Producer(s)	Length
1.	"Gurindam (Masyhur)"			1:41
2.	"Dikir Puteri"	Hairul Anuar Harun	Pak Ngah	4:54
3.	"Joget Berkias Kasih"	Siso	S. Atan	3:39
4.	"Permata Kasih"	Nurul Asyiqin	S.M. Noor	5:07
5.	"Lat Tali Lat"	Kazar Saisi	Kazar Saisi	4:53
6.	"Zapin Pusaka"	Megamutiara	Fadzil Ahmad	4:37
7.	"Di Anjung Rindu"	Nurul Asyiqin	Rahim Jantan	3:59
8.	"Joget Mengidam Rindu"	Raja Kobat	Raja Kobat	5:30
9.	"Dendang Anak"	Ahmad Jusoh	Ahmad Jusoh	4:30
10.	"Kisah Satu Malam"	Hairul Anuar Harun	Anak Sarawak	5:23
11.	"Dondang Dendang"	Hairul Anuar Harun	Pak Ngah	5:32
Total length:				50:17

== Personnel ==
The following is a list of the team involved in the production of Noraniza Idris's eighth album, Masyhur.

- Tan Su Loke – Executive Producer
- Sham Amir Hussain – A&R Manager
- Andy Pok – Manager
- Pak Ngah & S.Atan – Producers
- Pak Ngah, S.Atan, S.M. Noor, Kazar Saisi, Fadzil Ahmad, Rahim Jantan, Raja Kobat, Ahmad Jusoh & Anak Sarawak – Composers
- Pak Ngah – Accordion, Maracas, Gong, Keyboard & Rebana
- Iona, Khairil Khamis, Raja Kobat, Siso, Wann & Widi – Backing Vocals
- Syed Hassan Al-Mansyur – Bass
- Fareez – Mixing Engineer
- Pak Ya – Drums (Dikir)
- Rahim Jantan – Drums (Rebana), backing vocals
- AS Design & Print – Graphic design
- Ted – Guitar
- Hana Creative Image – Image Editor
- Noraniza Idris – Vocals
- Hairul Anuar Harun, Siso, Nurul Asyiqin, Kazar Saisi, Megamutiara, Raja Kobat & Ahmad Jusoh – Lyricists
- Ariffin, Bard, Joe, Nieta & Tina – Promotion
- Wong – Sound Engineer
- Lau & Vincent – Sound Engineers
- Suria Strings Group – Strings
- Fauzi Mamat – Tar (Drum) & Drum
- Rosnan – Tar (Drum), Drum (Kompang) & Tabla
- Pak Ngah – Tar (Gendang), Gendang (Rebana), Gendang (Kompang), Rebana, Accordion, Maracas, Gong, Keyboard & Backing Vocals
- Dean – Tar (drum), drum (rebana), drum (kompang), rebana, shaker & backing vocals
- Rezali Ayub – Violin (solo)
- Yassin – Lute

== Company label ==
- Recording company - Suria Records Sdn. Bhd.
- Distributed - Suwah Enterprise (M) Sdn. Bhd.
- Recorded - Pro Recording Studio, Cheras Perdana

== Live performance ==
The song "Dikir Puteri" was entrusted to her to perform live during the closing ceremony of the 1998 Commonwealth Games on September 21, 1998 at the Stadium Nasional Bukit Jalil, Kuala Lumpur where renowned singers in Malaysia performed together, notably alongside Siti Nurhaliza who also sang her own ethnic pop song, "Cindai". And most uniquely, at that time Siti Nurhaliza and Jay Jay sang the chorus of the song "Dikir Puteri" in English.

Then in 2017, the song was also performed live by her, along with the theme song, "Wangikanlah Hatimu", in her performance at the 30th Berita Harian Popular Star Awards, where she performed the song with dikir barat movements and special South Thailand Malay dance accompaniment. After that, she also performed this song alongside "Dondang Dendang" in the first round of the Gegar Vaganza 2020 competition, which was her first participation, and managed to secure the number one spot with a score of 90.90 per cent. Due to its immense popularity, he always performs this song whenever he organises his concerts in Malaysia.

== Critical review ==
The album received highly positive reviews from local and regional music critics. Following the commercial success of her previous album, critics from the New Straits Times newspaper praised Noraniza Idris’s efforts to elevate ethnic music through this album. She was praised for presenting original song material rich in authentic traditional Malay rhythms, including influences from genres such as zapin, ghazal, inang, joget, rodat, gambus and masri, through songs such as “Zapin Pusaka” (composed by Fadzil Ahmad with lyrics by Megamutiara). This wide-ranging musical exploration has been described by arts critics as a bold experiment that has successfully given the local pop industry a new identity without being overshadowed by foreign musical trends.

From a technical vocal perspective, critics have lavished praise on Noraniza's vocal control and the dynamics of her delivery. According to excerpts from reviews, the recording of the traditional songs on this album is recognised as requiring a high level of vocal control (“requires good voice control”). Noraniza herself acknowledged this difficulty, particularly when recording the hit song "Dikir Puteri". She stated that initially she had not expected to face any problems singing this song in the Western dikir style, but realised just how difficult the recording process was once it had begun. She reportedly had to make five attempts at the vocal recording (“It took five attempts”) before she was truly satisfied with the resulting quality. Noraniza expressed her satisfaction with the outcome of the project, stating that she had given her very best to ensure the quality of the Masyhur album was of the highest standard.

== Additional information ==
This album had a much greater impact than its predecessor, Ala Dondang. It sold very well in the market and was even a hit in neighbouring countries, particularly in Southern Thailand, due to its 'Dikir Barat' concept song, "Dikir Puteri". which became a smash hit in Malaysia and Thailand, particularly in Southern Thailand. The song was frequently played on radio stations, briefly becoming the most mainstream song to date. The album sold 120,000 units and once again earned a Double Platinum award. Unexpectedly, the album made Noraniza Idris's name even more prominent and popular in Malaysia and Thailand.

The album was then reviewed by Zainal Abdul Kadir of the New Straits Times, who ranked it fourth to third among the ten most influential albums of 1998. It also reviewed Noraniza Idris's performance when she gave a performance of her popular song, "Dikir Puteri", on stage at the 13th Juara Lagu Awards (1998).

== Charts ==
Album

Chart (1998)	Peak position
Malaysia (RIM Chart)	3

Single

Year	Title	Peak position			
Year	Title	Muzik FM	ERA FM	HOT FM	Muzik Muzik
1998	"Dikir Puteri"	1	1	—	1
1998	Zapin Pusaka	5	—	—	5
1998	"Joget Berkias Kasih"	13	—	—	9
1998	"Dondang Dendang"	2	—	—	2

== Award and nomination ==
=== Anugerah Industri Muzik ===
Year	Nominee(s)	Category	Decision
1999	Masyhur	Best Ethnic Pop Album	Won
1999	Masyhur	Best Album	Nominated
1999	Noraniza Idris - Masyhur	Best Vokal Performance in the Album (Female)	Nominated

=== Anugerah Juara Lagu ===
Year	Nominee(s)	Category	Decision
1998	"Dikir Puteri"	Best Performance	Won
1999	"Dondang Dendang"	Best Performance	Won

== Certification ==
Country	Certification	Sales
Malaysia	1× Platinum	120,000

== Released history ==
Country	Released date	Format	Label
Malaysia	June 1, 1998	CD, Casset, Album, Promo	Suria Records
Malaysia	2003	CD, Album, Reprint	Suria Records
