= Stacy (Malaysian singer) =

Malaysian singer (born 1990)

Stacy ADK
- ستيسي
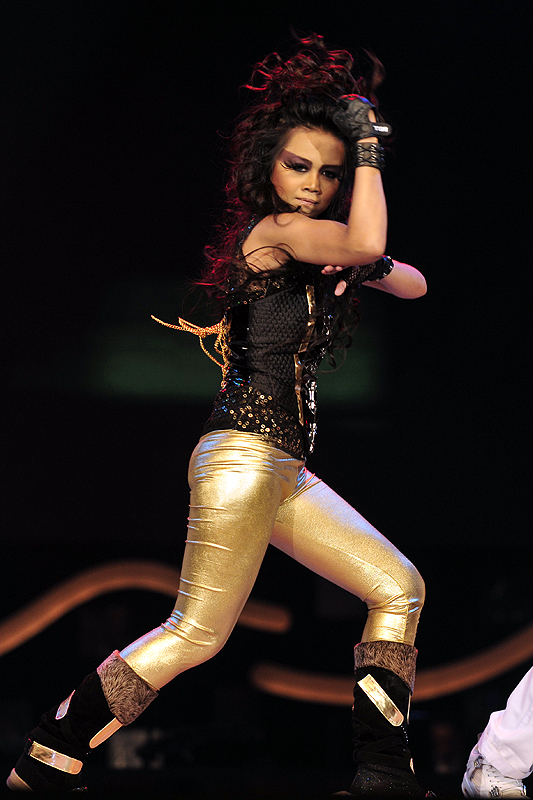
- Stacy performs during Juara Lagu 2008
- Born: Stracie Angie Anam; 18 August 1990 (age 36); Penampang, Sabah, Malaysia
- Occupations: Singer; songwriter; dancer; businesswoman; producer
- Years active: 2008–present
- Title: Dancing Queen of Malaysia
- Spouse: Akim Ahmad (m. 2016)
- Children: 3
- Parents: Anam Bayar (father); Agnes Kaloos (mother)
- Relatives: Chaq Mentor (brother)
- Musical career
- Genres: Pop; Pop rock; R&B; dance; Dance-pop; Electropop; Ballad
- Instrument: Vocals
- Labels: Maestro/ Astro Talent/ Rocketfuel Entertainment (2008–2018); Warner Music Malaysia (2011–2014); Rhythm And Rhyme Entertainment (2018-present)

Ummu Shaikhah Stacy binti Anam (née Stracie Angie Anam; 18 August 1990), known professionally by the mononym Stacy, is a Malaysian singer, songwriter and producer who rose to fame after winning the sixth season of Akademi Fantasia, receiving 43% of over 3.8 million votes. Her debut album, Aku Stacy, was released on 9 March 2009. She also known as the Dancing Queen of Malaysia. As a composer and lyricist, she is known as Bunga Cantik.

== Early life ==
Stacy was born in Kota Kinabalu to Anam Bayar and Agnes Kaloos. She began her studies at SRK St. Joseph, then at St. Michael's Secondary School, Penampang. Due to her family's financial problems, she dropped out of school at age 16 when she was in Secondary 4. To support her family, she became a singer in local clubs.

Prior to her audition for AF6, Stacy tried out for other notable singing reality shows, such as One in a Million 1, and also Gang Starz in which she teamed up with her brother, Camellus De'lleli Anam, to form a group named E-voke. However, she only made it to the semi-finals before they were eliminated. Her decision to audition for AF6 was derived from her mother's suggestion, as soon as she turned 18.

Stacy was also given a full scholarship to continue her studies at the Limkokwing University of Creative Technology. She studied in Diploma of Music and Art, and began her first semester in February 2010.

== Musical career ==
=== Akademi Fantasia ===
Stacy competed against thirteen other contestants to win Season 6 of Akademi Fantasia. The judging panel often praised her for being consistent, which implied she was a front-runner of the season. Ramli M.S., the academy principal of AF6 complimented Stacy as a loyal student who is very serious in learning something new. According to him, Stacy is always focus during each lesson and applied all the lessons that she learned during her performances on stage. Throughout the competition, Stacy remained at top three when the voting session was closed at the end of every concert, with four collective highest votes. Before the finale concert, three out of four media reporters predicted her to be the winner of the show. At the end of the finale, she was crowned as the sixth winner of the show, beating four other students, with a vote of 43%.

Akademi Fantasia season 6 performances and results
Week	Instructed Songs	Original Artist	Result #
Week 1	"No One"	Alicia Keys	2
Week 2	"Rela"	Tila	1
Week 3	"Pelesit Kota"	Kumpulan Search	1
Week 4	"Cinta Khayalan"	Bob AF2/Stacy	2
Week 5	"Makhluk Tuhan Paling Sexy"	Mulan Jameela	2
Week 6	"Don't Speak"	No Doubt	1
Week 7	"Hati"	Siti Nurhaliza	1
Week 8	"Gembira Hidup Ini"	Farah AF2	3
Week 9	"Beat It" "Ada Cinta" (Duet with Nubhan)	Michael Jackson; Acha Septriasa & Irwansyah	2
Finale	"Atas Nama Cinta" "Aku Stacy"	Rossa; Stacy	Winner

=== 2008–2010: Aku Stacy ===
Stacy's coronation song "Aku Stacy" was released immediately after her win and it became a huge success. The song quickly became her first No. 1 single in Carta Era for two weeks, as well as topping Carta 30 Era at No. one. It stayed on the chart for 22 weeks, making its one of the songs that stayed on the chart for a long period of time. The single also entered Muzik FM chart at No. 9. In Hot FM 30, the song peaked at No. 14 before dropping off the chart. In Muzik Muzik, it peaked at No. 3.

Following the success of her first single, Stacy's show "Aku Stacy" was launched on Astro Ria. The show featured her journey in the entertainment industry after her win. In the meantime, her first compilation live album, The Best of Stacy was released in September 2008 which featured all ten of her performances in Akademi Fantasia, excluding the fifth concert. The album was well-received selling thousands of copies in its the first week.

In December 2008, the song "Aku Stacy" made it to the final round of Anugerah Juara Lagu, an annual award show in Malaysia to honour the best Malay song each year, a rare accomplishment made by newcomers in the industry. Despite her busy schedules to be fully prepared for Anugerah Juara Lagu, Stacy's second single, "Gagap", premiered in the season finale of Sehati Berdansa. The song was commercially successful and became her second single to reach Top 5 on most charts. In Carta Era, the single peaked at No. 2 and was held off by Adam's "Benar-Benar". In Carta Hot Fm, the song debuted at No. 17 and went to peak at No. 5. The song also entered Carta Muzik FM at No. 10, and eventually peaked at No. 4. In Carta Muzik Muzik, the it peaked at No. 2, being held off by Adam's "Benar-Benar". Along with Nubhan, fellow student of AF6, Stacy was listed fourth in Murai's list of "Most Outstanding Newcomers of 2008".

In February 2009, Stacy was short-listed as the top 5 finalist for three major categories in Anugerah Bintang Popular, namely Most Popular Artiste, Most Popular Female New Artist, as well as Most Popular Female Singer, where she was voted as the Most Popular Female New Artist. Stacy was also given a certificate of recognition by Sabah's Ministry of Sport and Youth (KBS) for her on-going efforts to improve herself as a newcomer in the entertainment industry. She was also recognised as Sabah's youth icon and idol in the entertainment industry.

Her debut album, Aku Stacy, was released on 9 March 2009. She worked closely with notable local composers such as Ajai, Audi Mok as well as Edry KRU and Kieran Kuek. Just like the previous winners of Akademi Fantasia, she gets the opportunity to launch her album in her own town which takes place in Kota Kinabalu.

Stacy's third single, "Pakai Buang" was released on 9 May 2009. The song slowly climbed national charts peaked at No. 5 in Carta Muzik FM. In Carta Muzik Muzik, "Pakai Buang" debuted at No. 5 and peaked at No. 4. In June 2009, Stacy was nominated in Shout! Awards 2009 for the category of Popstar Award, in which she won. She was also being nominated in two categories of 2009 Anugerah Planet Muzik, Best Vocal Performance in a Song for New Female Artiste and Most Popular Malaysian Artiste which was won by Siti Nurhaliza by only 1%. Stacy was voted second.

=== Astro Mania! ===
In March 2011, Stacy participated in Astro Mania! contest where Malaysia's established singers compete amongst themselves to be crowned the Superstar. Stacy was selected by M. Nasir to join his red team. She remained at Top 5 every week in the competition until the finals. She ended up as runner-up winning RM250,000.

=== 2013: Stay-C ===
Her second album, Stay-C was released on 9 September 2011. The album contains eight new songs, with the lead radio single, Kisah Dongeng. The album is produced by Astro and distributed by Warner Music Malaysia.

On 11 November 2011, Stacy's new single "Kasanova" was officially launched with behind the scenes footage, special acoustics performances and the world premiere of Kasanova music video.

"Pelangi Senja" was released as the third single from Stay-C. The song was a commercial success, peaking atop Hot.fm and Muzik Muzik charts. The ballad showcased Stacy's versatile vocals, with critics praising her vocal performance in the song. The song was also hailed at No.2 as the most popular song in Malaysia in 2012. Stacy managed to get to the final of the 27th Anugerah Juara Lagu. The video was released in July 2012.

=== 2014–2016: #1 ===
The success of her final single from Stay-C, "Bosan" was proven when the song managed to compete in the grand final of AJL28 in January 2014. It was her fifth time competing in the final round of the most prestigious musical event in Malaysia. Her performance was received with mixed reviews by critics.

Stacy's third album, #1 was released on 17 May 2014 at Zouk KL. The album contains 10 songs, including the single, "Gilalah" and the collaboration with Indonesian boyband, SM*SH, "Hello". The album has 2 CDs, whereby CD2 features remix version of the songs. The album was released in Malaysia, Singapore, Indonesia and Brunei. The album proved Stacy's artistry as she was involved directly in the making of the album from the beginning to the end.

Stacy proved herself once again as a consistent artist when her first single "Gilalah" made it to the final of AJL29 in 2015. "Gilalah" was a commercial success, having been played on the mainstream radios such as ERA.fm and Hot.fm every so often. It was the first song where Stacy was fully involved in making the lyrics. The video of the single was directed by herself and first showed exclusively on MeleTop.

In September 2014, Stacy released the video of "Patah" a promotional single from the album. Despite the solid vocal performance, the song failed to crack the radio charts.

Stacy made a triumphant comeback to the music and radio charts with her third single, "Not For Sale" featuring Malaysian famous rapper Altimet, which charted highly on most radio charts, as well as topping the Muzik-Muzik charts. "Not For Sale" also became a soundtrack for Malay popular drama "Tuan Anas Mikael". The accompanying music video was released on 4 August 2015. The song also brought Stacy to her 7th AJL appearance in January 2016. Although she was sick a day before her performance, she wowed the audiences with her vocals and moves.

Stacy's single "Romeo" was released on 30 January 2016. Her husband, Akim wrote the song for her. After her marriage with Akim, she released a song called "Bila-Bila" which discusses her love for her husband. The song was released on Team Sangat Gila Stacy channel on YouTube on 22 October 2016. Stacy later took a break from music due to pregnancy and taking care of her family.

=== 2017-present: "Cakap Ke Tangan", Rhyme & Rhythm Music Entertainment (R&R) and venture into song-writing ===
After about a year-long hiatus, Stacy released her new dance-pop single "Cakap Ke Tangan" on 25 August 2017. The song is written by her husband, Akim Ahmad and Laq. The official music video for the single was released on 13 October 2017 and was directed by Casper, whom she works with for the "Not For Sale" video.

In July 2018, Stacy announced that she is not renewing her contract with her management company, Rocketfuel Entertainment. She has been with the company since her Akademi Fantasia debut in 2008. She also announced that she has set up her own talent management company, Rhyme & Rhythm Music Entertainment with husband, Akim.

Stacy ventured into song-writing, under the pseudonym "Bunga Cantik" with the release of single "Rampas" that was popularized by Akim & The Majistret in August 2018. She wrote her second single, "Khayal" which was released on 12 July 2019. On 14 February 2020, Akim and Stacy again created a duet to their fans named " Aku Kau dan Muzik" with their own creation and Freddy HyperAct. This song has been accepted by fans as the melody and lyrics are very interesting and profound for the couple in love.

In 2022 at the 36th Anugerah Juara Lagu grand final night, Stacy for the first time won an award at the prestigious event. Her song Cinta by Marsha Milan created by her as a composer with Akim Ahmad was recognized as the second best song at the AJL 36.

== Discography ==
=== Studio albums ===
Year	Album information
2008	The Best of Stacy: Format: Concert Compilation; Release Date: March 2008; Record Label: Maestro Entertainment
2009	Aku Stacy: Format: 1st Album; Release Date: December 2009; Record Label: AESB
2011	Stay-C: Format: 2nd Album; Release Date: September 2011; Record Label: Warner Music Malaysia
2014	#1: Format: 3rd Album; Release Date: June 2014; Record Label: Warner Music Malaysia

=== Singles ===
Year	Single	Peak chart positions			Album		
Year	Single	Era	Hot FM	Muzik Muzik	Album		
2008	"Aku Stacy"	1	14	1	Aku Stacy		
2008	"Gagap"	2	5	2	Aku Stacy		
2009	"Pakai Buang"	1	4	1	Aku Stacy		
2009	"Cinta Yang Ku Duga"	–	–	–	Aku Stacy		
2009	"Cinta Khayalan"	–	–	–	Aku Stacy		
2010	"Kisah Kita"	–	–	–	Non-album single		
2010	"Jahat"	1	1	1	Hitman KRU		
2011	"Kisah Dongeng"	1	1	1	Stay-C		
2011	"Kasanova"	5	2	2	Stay-C		
2012	"Pelangi Senja"	17	1	1	Stay-C		
2013	"Bosan"	13	6	2	Stay-C		
2013	"Hello" (feat. SM*SH)	36	–	–	#1		
2014	#1	–	–	–	#1		
2014	"Gilalah"	23	3	1	#1		
2014	"Patah"	–	–	–	#1		
2015	"Not For Sale" (feat. Altimet)	7	3	1	#1		
2016	"Romeo"	12	5	4	Non-album single		
2016	"Bila-Bila"	28	21	–	Non-album single		
2017	"Cakap Ke Tangan"	27	–	4	Non-album single		
2018	"Raja"				Non-album single		
2019	"Khayal"	24	10	4	Non-album single		
2020	"Aku,Kau & Muzik" (feat. Akim Ahmad)			2	Non-album single		
2021	"Peluk"				Non-album single		
2022	"Duit"				Non-album single		
2023	"Teriak"				Non-album single		
2023	"Ritma & Rima" (feat. Akim Ahmad)				Non-album single		
2024	"Menyala"				Non-album single		
2025	"Mega-Ching!"	1	1	1	Non-album single	Stay-C	"Cinta Negara, Selamanya"
2026	"Misompuu"	"MAMA"			Non-album single	Stay-C	
"-" denotes releases that did not chart.						Stay-C	

=== Aidilfitri song ===
- Salam Lebaran with Hot FM announcer 2011, Shila, Faizal Tahir, Shahir, Akim, Black, Hafiz, Ayu, Tomok and Mawi (Hangatnya Raya Hot FM)
- Bunga Api Di Hati with Fara Fauzana, Shila and Sharifah Aleya (Hangatnya Raya Hot FM)

=== Collaborations ===
Year	Single	Peak chart positions				Album
Year	Single	Era!	Hot FM 30!	Muzik FM!	Muzik Muzik	
2012	Kembali (with Akim Ahmad)	–	–	–	3	Akim Ahmad
2013	Semalam Tanpamu (with KRU)	33	–	–	–	KRUNOMENA
2013	Hello (with SM*SH)	36	–	–	–	#1
2015	Not For Sale (with Altimet)	7	3		1	#1
2015	Berteman Sepi (with Pasha Ungu)	–	–	–		MOZAIK
2020	Aku,Kau & Muzik (with Akim Ahmad)	–	–	–		Non-album single
2023	Ritma & Rima (with Akim Ahmad)	–	–	–		Non-album single

=== Soundtracks ===
- "Raya Datang Lagi" – Rumah Baru, Bini Baru, Baru Raya (Astro Prima Aidilfitri Special) (2008)
- "Rasa-rasa Cinta" – Sayang You Can Dance OST (2009)
- "Menggegar Dunia" – My Spy OST (2009)
- "Primadona" – My Spy OST (2009)
- "Kisah Kita" – K.I.T.A. (drama series) (2010)
- "Kata Kau" – Kata Kau (Astro Ria gameshow) (2010)
- "Lihatlah Dunia" – Dottie (drama series) (2010)
- "Jahat" – Skuad D6 Putrajaya (drama series TV2) (2011)
- "Jahatnya Cinta" (with Akim) – for the 'Say it with Cornetto Style' campaign (2011)
- "Gilalah" – Aku Mahu Superbibik. (Telemovie Astro Ceria) (2014)
- "Hello" – Apam Lemak Manis. (drama series TV1) (2014)
- "Not For Sale" – Tuan Anas Mikhael. (Drama Series Astro Ria) (2015)
- "Kasanova" – Tuan Anas Mikhael 5 Hari Beraya. (Drama Series Astro Ria) (2016)
- "Khayal" – Demi Rindumu. (Drama Series Astro Ria) (2019)
- "Cara U" – U Mobile Borneo Plan. (Postpaid plan) (2024)
- "Cinta Negara, Selamanya" – with RTM Orchestra Chorus (National Day and Malaysia Day Theme Song 2025)

=== Concerts, showcases and tours ===
==== Solo ====
- DFP Presents: Stacy, Petronas Philharmonic Hall, Kuala Lumpur (25 February 2023)
- Aku Stacy Menggegar Kota U, Sabah International Convention Centre, Kota Kinabalu (21 June 2025)

== Personal life ==
Stacy was previously a Roman Catholic before converting to Islam in August 2015 to marry her partner, and chose Ummu Shaikhah Stacy binti Anam as her Muslim name. Stacy married Malaysian singer-songwriter Akim Ahmad in Kota Kinabalu, Sabah in 2016. On 17 February 2017, the couple had their first child, a daughter named Eshaal. On 6 August 2022 they had a second child, a son named Isa. In addition to their two biological children, they also have an adopted daughter named Bella Deluna.

== Filmography ==
Television shows and appearances
Year	Title	Role	Notes
2016	Romantika Raya	Herself	Astro Production alongside Akim
2019	Mentor Milenia	Herself	Vocal Coach/Mentor, Mentor Milenia
2020	I Can See Your Voice Malaysia	Herself	Guest artist, season 3

== Awards and nominations ==
Year	Competition	Awards/Nominated Works	Recipients	Result
2008	Sabah Ministry Youth & Sports	Sabah Youth Icon Award	Stacy	Won
2008	Akademi Fantasia (season 6)	1st Place Winner	Stacy	Won
2008	Anugerah Juara Lagu 23	Aku Stacy	Stacy	Nominated
2009	Anugerah Bintang Popular Berita Harian 22	Popular New Female Artist	Stacy	Won
2009	Anugerah Planet Muzik	Best New Female Artist	Stacy	Nominated
2009	Anugerah Planet Muzik	Most Popular Malaysian Artist	Stacy	Nominated
2009	Shout! Awards	Popstar Award	Stacy	Won
2009	JCI The Outstanding Young Persons of Sabah	Cultural and Artistic Achievement	Stacy	Won
2009	Anugerah Juara Lagu 24	Pakai Buang	Stacy	Nominated
2009	Anugerah Juara Lagu 24	Hotlink People's Choice Award	Pakai Buang	Won
2010	Anugerah Bintang Popular Berita Harian 23	Popular Female Singer	Stacy	Nominated
2010	HipTV Awards	Cutest Artist	Stacy	Won
2010	Anugerah Industri Muzik 17	Best Pop Album	Aku Stacy	Nominated
2010	Anugerah Juara Lagu 25	Jahat	Stacy	Nominated
2011	Anugerah Bintang Popular Berita Harian 24	Popular Female Singer	Stacy	Nominated
2011	DiGi WWWOW Awards	Fave Malaysian Female Online Celebrity	Stacy	Won
2012	Pilihan Pembaca Media Hiburan	Anugerah Artis Stylo	Stacy	Won
2012	Anugerah Bintang Popular Berita Harian 25	Popular Female Singer	Stacy	Nominated
2012	Anugerah Bintang Popular Berita Harian 25	Most Popular Female Artist Online	Stacy	Won
2012	Anugerah Industri Muzik 19	Best Album	Stay-C	Nominated
2012	Anugerah Industri Muzik 19	Best Song Arrangement	Kasanova	Nominated
2012	Anugerah Industri Muzik 19	Best Music Video	Pelangi Senja	Nominated
2012	Anugerah MACP 2012	Malay song: Highest Performance Category	Pakai Buang	Won
2013	Anugerah Juara Lagu 27	Pelangi Senja	Stacy	Nominated
2013	Shorty Awards (Fifth Annual)	Best Singer in Social Media	Stacy	Nominated
2013	Shorty Awards (Fifth Annual)	Best Reality Star in Social Media	Stacy	Nominated
2013	Shorty Awards (Fifth Annual)	Best Music in Social Media	Stacy	Nominated
2013	Shout! Awards	Music Video Award	Stacy feat. KRU	Won
2013	Anugerah Industri Muzik 20	Best Pop Song	Bosan	Nominated
2014	Anugerah Juara Lagu 28	Bosan	Stacy	Nominated
2014	Anugerah Bintang Popular Berita Harian 27	Popular Female Singer	Stacy	Won
2014	Anugerah Bintang Popular Berita Harian 27	Duo Artist/Group Popular	Stacy with Akim	Won
2015	Anugerah Juara Lagu 29	Gilalah	Stacy	Nominated
2015	Anugerah Industri Muzik 21	Best Album	#1	Nominated
2015	Anugerah Industri Muzik 21	Best Album Cover	#1	Won
2015	Anugerah Planet Muzik	Best Duo/Group (Berteman Sepi)	Stacy feat. Ungu	Nominated
2015	Anugerah Planet Muzik	Best Collaboration (Berteman Sepi)	Stacy feat. Ungu	Nominated
2016	Anugerah Juara Lagu 30	Not For Sale	Stacy feat. Altimet	Nominated
2016	Anugerah Pilihan Online	Best Female Singer	Stacy	Nominated
2016	Anugerah Industri Muzik 22	Best Music Video	"Not For Sale"	Won
2017	Anugerah Meletop Era	Couple Meletop	Herself (shared with Akim)	Won
2018	Anugerah Meletop Era	Couple Meletop	Herself (shared with Akim)	Nominated
2022	Anugerah Juara Lagu 36	1st Runner Up - Cinta (composer - Bunga Cantik/Hang Nadim)	Herself (shared with Akim)	Won
2024	The Masked Singer Malaysia (season 4)	Participant	Herself as Bunga Matahari	Won

== Honours ==
- Sabah
  - Member of the Order of Kinabalu (A.D.K.) - 2024

== Endorsements ==
Stacy is currently the ambassador for Clinelle (a skin care product), Cornetto, SilkyGirl and Intimate. In 2013, she was appointed as Drive M7 (an energy drink) ambassador, together with Aaron Aziz and Fizo Omar. Stacy also appears in Kit Kat and Digi advertisements along with her husband, Akim Ahmad. Stacy was a spokesperson for BOH Tea (2009), Power Root-Ali Cafe (2009), Canon Malaysia (2009) and Corntoz Mamee Double-Decker (2009).

Since 2017, Stacy is one of the spokesperson for Anlene. She's also a spokesperson for Maggi Cukup Rasa seasoning from Maggi brand.

Preceded by Norsyarmilla Jirin	Akademi Fantasia winner Stracie Angie Anam (2008)	Succeeded by Mohd Hafiz Mohd Suip
