= Cinta Terhalang =

Single by Bob
- Released: May 2008
- Genre: Pop
- Length: 3:57
- Label: Maestro Talents Sdn. Bhd.
- Songwriters: Sharon Paul, Shimy
- Producer: Sharon Paul

Bob singles chronology
"Hantaran Hati" (2007)	"Cinta Terhalang" (2008)

"Cinta Terhalang" (translation: Inhibited Love) is a song performed by Malaysian singer Bob, who rose to prominence by placing fifth in the second season of Akademi Fantasia. The song, which was released in May 2008, serves as the first single from his upcoming untitled album.

== Song dispute ==
In the fourth concert of Akademi Fantasia, Season 6, Stacy was given the song as a reward for her consistent performance throughout the first four-week of the season. Thus, when the song is released as a single by Bob in May 2008, it created a controversy about the original singer of the song.

Bob claimed that the song was given by him firsthand by the original composer Sharon Paul. According to Sharon, the song was long ago sent to Astro to be given to any artist under the label. However, no response was given and thus, she decided to give the song to Bob to be recorded for his new album.

However, Stacy's rendition was slightly modified compared to the original composition provided to Bob. Additionally, Sharon deliberately changed the title to "Cinta Khayalan" for Stacy's version.

== Single release ==
The song was released to radio stations across Malaysia in May 2008.

== Track listing ==
1. "Cinta Terhalang [Studio Version]" – 3:57

== Award ==
=== 2008 ===
In November 2008, the single was chosen to compete in Ballad Semi-finalist in Anugerah Juara Lagu 2008. Despite not making it to the final, Bob performed his very best and gave a heated competition to the other songs that he was competing with.

Award ceremony	Category	Result
Anugerah Juara Lagu	Best Ballad Song	Semi-finalist
