= Gila Lah! =

"Gilalah"

Single by Stacy

from the album #1
- Released: 15 May 2014
- Genre: Dance-pop
- Length: 3:28
- Label: Warner Music, Astro
- Songwriter: Stacy
- Producers: Omar K., Mike Chan

Stacy singles chronology
"Bosan" (2013)	"Gilalah" (2014)	"Not For Sale" (2015)

"Gila Lah!" or "Gilalah" (translation: "Crazy!") is a song written by Stacy and produced by Omar K. and Mike Chan for her third album, "#1" (2014). It was released on 15 May 2014 as the lead single from the album.

== Composition ==
Lyrically the song tells about how Stacy is living her "crazy" life and how she is as a person. The song is a dance-pop song. Stacy also mentioned her adopted daughter Bella in this song. This song is also her first attempt on writing songs after being challenged by long-time friend and producer Omar K. She wrote the song in two hours.

== Music video ==
The music video of this song was released on 15 May 2014, making its television debut on Era FM MeleTOP. The video was also directed by her. The video has been viewed more than 1 million times on YouTube.

== Chart performances ==
The song was a commercial success for Stacy, peaking at No.23 on Era 40, No.3 on Hot.fm, and No.1 on Muzik Muzik Chart. The song also advanced to final round of Anugerah Juara Lagu 29.

Chart (2014)	Peak position
Carta Era 40	23
Carta Hot FM 30	3
Carta Muzik Muzik	1
