= Kaer Azami =

Kaer Azami خير عزمي
- Born: Wan Mohammad Khair bin Wan Azami Hamzah; 30 August 1985 (age 41); Petaling Jaya, Selangor, Malaysia
- Genre: Pop
- Occupations: Singer, songwriter, record producer product designer
- Instrument: Voice
- Years active: 2004–present
- Label: Sphinx Flame
- Website: kaerkazami.com

Wan Mohammad Khair Wan Azami Hamzah (born 30 August 1985), popularly known as Kaer Azami, is a Malaysian singer-turned- designer. He was born and raised in Petaling Jaya. He represented Malaysia in various international art competitions during his elementary and high school. He won first prize in most of the competition. He was sent to Sri Bestari and Inai Beacon House International for his early education. He is the son of a famous architect Wan Azami bin Hamzah. His mother Kharidah Kadir is the daughter of the late Dato' Abdul Kadir from Sri Menanti who used to be the Speaker of Negeri Sembilan. Kaer Azami rose to prominence by coming sixth in the second season of a popular television talent show. Akademi Fantasia Kaer won Best Song at Anugerah Industri Muzik Malaysia 2008 with his song entitled Izinku Pergi composed by Azlan Abu Hassan, Lyric by Sulu Sarawak. He was also nominated for best new singer, best pop album and best male vocal. Later in 2009, Kaer went to Jakarta to pursue his Degree in Retail Business (Lasalle Int college).

== Biography ==
=== Early commercial success (2002–2004) ===
Kaer Azami was one of the contestants of Akademi Fantasia Season 2 in 2004. He made it all the way to the final and he was placed sixth. Apart from this, he was the main cast for the 2002 Coca-Cola World Cup advertisement and hosted "Pelita Bahasa" on Astro Channel 15. He also worked on an advertisement for Maxis Hotlink and hosted Anugerah ERA internet TV in 2004.

=== First debut and second studio album ===
In February 2007, his debut album, Menjelma was released under his own label "Sphinx Flame". In March 2008 he launched another album entitled Unique

=== A New Chapter (2012) ===
In February 2012 he launched his third album entitled A New Chapter. However, the market summarised that the album was too urban and not radio friendly. He worked with award-winning Malaysian and Indonesian producers such as Azlan A.Hassan, Yovie Widianto, Bemby Noor, Tg Shafick, Audi Mok.

== Discography ==
=== Studio album ===
- Menjelma (2007)
- UNiQUE (Album Repackaged) (2009)
- A New Chapter (2012)

=== Compilation albums ===
- X-fresh Vol. 1 (2005)
- Evo 04 02 (2004)

=== Singles ===
Year	Single	Peak chart positions		Album
Year	Single	RIM Charts	Era	Album
2014	Andai	–	–	Non-album single
2018	Tak Pernah Hilang (duet with Amylea Azizan)	1	2	Non-album single

== Other Ventures ==
Kaer started fashion labels, Quhji and Kazami in 2009. He owns a clothing factory in Indonesia to cater for his fashion lines.
