= Aku Stacy (song) =

Single by Stacy

from the album Aku Stacy
- Released: 25 May 2008
- Genre: Pop rock, electropop
- Length: 2:50
- Label: Maestro Talents Sdn. Bhd.
- Songwriters: Intan Norul Azlina, Layla Ismail

Stacy singles chronology
"Aku Stacy" (2008)	"Gagap" (2008)

"Aku Stacy" (translation: I Am Stacy) was the coronation song and the debut single for the winner of the sixth season of Akademi Fantasia, Stacy.

== Background ==
Initially, the song was given the title "Aku Cinderella" but it was later changed to "Aku Stacy". It refers to someone who is physically and emotionally hurt by her opportunist lover. Regardless of her attempts to end the relationship, it all becomes futile. In the end, she realises that in order to be free, she has to stand strong and face her deepest fear, which is to sacrifice her feelings and love towards her lover, in order to "conquer" him.

Stacy performed the song during the final concert of Akademi Fantasia before she was crowned as the winner of the season. The day after her win, the song was released as a single in Era FM.

== Song structure ==
The studio version features the correct lyrics. However, during the original live performance, Stacy mistakenly sang different lyrics in the second verse. In the studio version, she sings, "ingin mengaut apa saja yang ada/namun aku penghalang", whereas in the live recording, she mistakenly sings, "aku yang berlagak bagai raja di istana/jadikan ku sang abdi".

== Music video ==
The music video focuses on Stacy, singing and dancing against a plain white background which lacks a set with four male backup dancers. This creates an element that emphasises solely on the complex choreography.

The choreography continues until the end of the video, before it shows the backup dancers applauding, and Stacy turning back comically to them in a humorous way.

== Track listing ==
1. "Aku Stacy [Studio Version]" – 2:50
2. "Aku Stacy [Live Version]" – 2:55
3. "Aku Stacy - Music Video – 2:58

== Chart performance ==
"Aku Stacy" debuted at number 15 in Carta Era. The following week, it rose to number 1, giving her the first number one single in the chart. The song managed to stay at the top for two weeks. The single also entered Hot FM 30 and managed to peak at #14. In Muzik FM chart, the song debuted at #9 and it managed to top the chart at #1, before slowly dropping out from the chart. The song also entered Muzik Muzik chart and peaking at #3.

Chart (2008)	Peak position
Carta Era	1
Carta Muzik Muzik	3
Carta Muzik FM	1
Carta Hot FM 30	14

== Award ==
=== 2008 ===
In December 2008, the song managed to get into the final round of Anugerah Juara Lagu in Pop Rock category. Despite not winning any major award in the show, Stacy's performance was listed fifth in Hits's Top 5 best performance in AJL that night.

Award ceremony	Category	Result
Anugerah Juara Lagu	Best Song	Finalist
Anugerah Juara Lagu	Best Pop Rock Song	Finalist
Anugerah Juara Lagu	Best Performance	Finalist
Anugerah Juara Lagu	Best Vocalist	Finalist
