= Akademi Fantasia season 6 =

Akademi Fantasia
- Season 6
- Hosted by: AC Mizal; Sarimah Ibrahim; Zainal Alam Kadir
- Judges: Fauziah Ahmad Daud; Ning Baizura
- Winner: Stracie Angie Anam
- Runner-up: Mohammad Idris Mohd. Zaizizi
- Finals venue: Putra Indoor Stadium

Release
- Original network: Astro Ria
- Original release: 22 March – 24 May 2008

Season chronology
- ← Previous; Season 5 Next → Season 7

The sixth season of Akademi Fantasia premiered on 22 March 2008 and concluded on 24 May 2008 on the Astro Ria television channel. Fauziah Ahmad Daud returned as a judge and was joined by new judge Ning Baizura, who replaced Hattan and Fauziah Latif. The season introduced AC Mizal as host, replacing Aznil Nawawi. The promotional catchphrase of this season is "Bring Out The Superstar Talent In You".

A few major changes were made this season. The show is eligible for Malaysian citizens aged from 18–45 years old, unlike the previous five seasons which were eligible for those who aged from 18–27 years old. The number of contestants was also decreased to 14, from 16 since Season 5.

The winner was 18-year-old Stracie Angie Anam, from Kota Kinabalu, Sabah, who became the youngest contestant ever to win the competition, beating Mohammad Idris Mohd. Zaizizi. She won prizes worth MYR733,734 which comprised a four-room bungalow at A'Famosa Villa D'Lagos, Melaka, a Peugeot 307XS car, cash worth MYR25,000, holiday package of 7 days and 5 nights at South Africa, holiday package to Italy, Sony PlayStation Portable and a trophy.

This season drew an overall 3.8 million votes which displayed a significant decrease from the previous season.

== Auditions ==
For Season 6, the auditions were held in the following cities:

- ASTRO, Bukit Jalil, Kuala Lumpur - 12 January & 13 January
- Crowne Plaza Riverside, Kuching, Sarawak - 17 January & 18 January
- Kompleks Asia City, Kota Kinabalu, Sabah - 17 January & 18 January
- Kompleks Mawar, Johor Bahru, Johor - 26 January & 27 January
- Gurney Hotel, Pulau Pinang - 26 January & 27 January
- ASTRO, Bukit Jalil, Kuala Lumpur - 2 February & 3 February

=== List of songs during auditions ===
Songs for female

- Persis Mutiara – Mila AF5
- Rindu Merindu – Fauziah Idris
- Jika Kau Kekasih – Linda Nanuwil
- Ya atau Tidak – Erra Fazira
- Salam Untuk Kekasih – Nadia
- Setiaku Korban – Fauziah Latiff
- Unfaithful – Rihanna
- Menaruh Harapan – Zaiton Sameon
- Akhirnya Kini Pasti – Anita Sarawak
- Pastikan – Siti Nurhaliza

Songs for male

- Langit Biru – Mawi
- Fantasia Bulan Madu – Amy Search
- Kasihnya Laila – Jinbara
- Joget Angan Tak Sudah– Jay Jay
- It’s Gonna Be Me – 'N Sync
- Izinku Pergi – Kaer Azami
- La Camisa Negra – Juanes
- Kisah Kau dan Aku – Alleycats
- Ku Juga Mencintai Dirimu – Saiful
- Azura – Jamal Abdillah

== Concert summaries ==
=== Week 1 ===
Original Airdate: 22 March 2008

Student	Song	Result
Alif	"Sayang Sayang" (Aliff Aziz)	Safe
Faisal	"Satu Kiblat Yang Sama" (Rabbani)	Safe
Ika	"Kesetiaan" (Siti Sarah)	Bottom 3
Lufya	"Ingkar" (Bunga Citra Lestari)	Bottom 3
Nadia	"Rindu" (Hetty Koes Endang)	Safe
Naim	"Memburu Rindu" (Hattan)	Safe
Nubhan	"Ruang Rindu" (Letto)	Safe
Rina	"(Simply) The Best" (Tina Turner)	Safe
Riz	"Ketulusan Hati" (Anuar Zain)	Safe
Saida	"Terlalu Cinta" (Rossa)	Safe
Stacy	"No One" (Alicia Keys)	Safe
Stanly	"You Raise Me Up" (Josh Groban)	Safe
Toi	"Pagi Yang Gelap" (Hujan)	Safe
Yana	"Diriku Tapak Sulaiman" (Elyana)	Eliminated

- Guest judge: Ajai

=== Week 2 ===
Original Airdate: 29 March 2008

Student	Song	Result
Alif	"Angan dan Sedar" (Mawi)	Safe
Faisal	"Ranggi Metropolis" (Awie)	Safe
Ika	"Malu Tapi Mahu" (Dina)	Eliminated
Lufya	"Cintaku 100%" (Mas Idayu)	Bottom 3
Nadia	"Umbrella" (Rihanna)	Safe
Naim	"Aspalela" (Saiful Apek)	Bottom 3
Nubhan	"Tak Bisa Memilihmu" (6ixth Sense)	Safe
Rina	"Ku Seru" (Misha Omar)	Safe
Riz	"Separuh Masa" (The Lima)	Safe
Saida	"Dokter Cinta" (Dewa Dewi)	Safe
Stacy	"Rela" (Tila)	Safe
Stanly	"Sudah Tu Sudah" (Imran Ajmain)	Safe
Toi	"Sang Pencinta" (M. Nasir)	Safe

- Guest judge: Aidit Alfian

=== Week 3 ===
Original Airdate: 5 April 2008

Student	Song	Result
Alif	"Kamelia" (Sweet Charity)	Safe
Faisal	"Sentuhan Kecundang" (Ekamatra)	Safe
Lufya	"Tika dan Saat Ini" (Medicine)	Eliminated
Nadia	"Total Eclipse of the Heart" (Bonnie Tyler)	Safe
Naim	"Opera Hidup" (Wings)	Eliminated
Nubhan	"Summer of '69" (Bryan Adams)	Safe
Rina	"Enter Sandman" (Metallica)	Safe
Riz	"Dari Sinar Mata" (Bumiputera Rockers)	Safe
Saida	"Sepi Sekuntum Mawar Merah" (Ella)	Safe
Stacy	"Pelesit Kota" (Search)	Safe
Stanly	"Patahnya Sayap Malam" (Masa)	Safe
Toi	"C.I.N.T.A." (X.P.D.C.)	Bottom 3

- Guest judge: Adlin Aman Ramlie

=== Week 4 ===
Original Airdate: 12 April 2008

Student	Song	Result
Alif	"Menghapus Jejakmu" (Peterpan)	Safe
Faisal	"Joget Bunga Melati" (Halil Chik)	Eliminated
Nadia	"Mengapa Dirindu" (Saloma)	Safe
Nubhan	"Cinta Hampa" (D'lloyd)	Safe
Rina	"Terbang Helang" (Sharifah Aini)	Bottom 3
Riz	"Marabahaya" (Pop Shuvit)	Safe
Saida	"Hati Kama" (Siti Nurhaliza & Noraniza Idris)	Safe
Stacy	"Cinta Khayalan" (Bob AF2)	Safe
Stanly	"Kasih Tercipta" (Faizal Tahir)	Safe
Toi	"Laukku Cukup Masin" (Spider)	Bottom 3

- Guest judge: Adlin Aman Ramlie

=== Week 5 ===
Original Airdate: 19 April 2008

Student	Song	Result
Alif	"Hai" (Adam)	Safe
Nadia	"Kalis Rindu" (Elyana)	Safe
Nubhan	"Kembali Senyum" (Izwan Pilus)	Safe
Rina	"Sorga dan Neraka" (Hetty Koes Endang)	Bottom 3
Riz	"Time Is Running Out" (Muse)	Safe
Saida	"Bila Bunga Berguguran" (Fauziah Ahmad Daud)	Eliminated
Stacy	"Makhluk Tuhan Paling Seksi" (Mulan Jameela)	Safe
Stanly	"Umi" (Dato' Shake)	Safe
Toi	"Beautiful Girls" (Sean Kingston)	Bottom 3

- Guest judge: Hetty Koes Endang

=== Week 6 ===
Original Airdate: 26 April 2008

Student	Song	Result
Alif	"Ketahuan" (Matta)	Bottom 3
Nadia	"Rama-Rama" (Ella)	Bottom 3
Nubhan	"Generasiku" (OAG)	Safe
Rina	"Ular" (Anita Sarawak)	Eliminated
Riz	"Seribu Tahun" (Imran Ajmain)	Safe
Stacy	"Don't Speak" (No Doubt)	Safe
Stanly	"Kata" (Hazami)	Safe
Toi	"Tak Bisakah" (Peterpan)	Safe

- Guest judges: Adlin Aman Ramlie & Adnan Abu Hassan

=== Week 7 ===
Original Airdate: 3 May 2008

Student	Song	Result
Alif	"Rozana" (Search)	Eliminated
Nadia	"One Night Only" (Dreamgirls)	Safe
Nubhan	"Dealova" (Once)	Bottom 3
Riz	"Memburu Impian" (Kaza)	Safe
Stacy	"Hati" (Siti Nurhaliza)	Safe
Stanly	"Footloose" (Kenny Loggins)	Safe
Toi	"Syakilla" (Rahim Maarof)	Bottom 3

- Guest judges: Adlin Aman Ramlie & Tiara Jacquelina

=== Week 8 ===
Original Airdate: 10 May 2008

Student	Song	Result
Nadia	"Karma" (Cokelat)	Saved
Nubhan	"Hanya Kau Yang Tahu" (Aizat AF5)	Safe
Riz	"Laskar Cinta" (Dewa)	Safe
Stacy	"Gembira Hidup Ini" (Farah AF2)	Safe
Stanly	"Naluri Lelaki" (Samsons)	Bottom 3
Toi	"Kasih Berduka" (M. Osman)	Bottom 3

- Guest judge: Ida Nerina

=== Week 9 ===
Original Airdate: 17 May 2008

Student	Song	Result
Nadia	"Lelaki Buaya Darat" (Ratu) "Endless Love" (Luther Vandross & Diana Ross) Duet with Riz	Bottom 3
Nubhan	"Tapi Bukan Aku" (Kerispatih) "Ada Cinta" (Acha Septriasa & Irwansyah) Duet with Stacy	Safe
Riz	"Rock Around The Clock" (Bill Haley) "Endless Love" (Luther Vandross & Diana Ross) Duet with Nadia	Bottom 3
Stacy	"Beat It" (Michael Jackson) "Ada Cinta" (Acha Septriasa & Irwansyah) Duet with Nubhan	Safe
Stanly	"Kerana" (Alleycats) "Lagu Jiwa Lagu Cinta" (Mawi & M. Nasir) Duet with Toi	Eliminated
Toi	"Kau Yang Bernama Seri" (Handy Black) "Lagu Jiwa Lagu Cinta" (Mawi & M. Nasir) Duet with Stanly	Safe

- Guest judge: Afdlin Shauki

=== Week 10 ===
Original Airdate: 24 May 2008

Student	Song	Result
Nadia	"Aku Lebih Tahu" (Mila) "Kalut Lagi Mengarut" (Nadia)	Fifth
Nubhan	"Bukan Di Sini" (Sofaz) "Ada Untukmu" (Nubhan)	Third
Riz	"11 Januari" (Gigi) "Hanya Sandiwara" (Riz)	Runner-up
Stacy	"Atas Nama Cinta" (Rossa) "Aku Stacy" (Stacy)	Winner
Toi	"Cinta Zulaikha" (Mawi) "Paling Terindah" (Toi)	Fourth

- Guest judge: Adlin Aman Ramlie

== Students ==
(ages stated are at time of contest)

Student	Age	Hometown	Rank
Marliyana Binti Omar Walid	24	Kuala Kangsar, Perak	14th
Ika Nabila Binti Abdul Rahim	19	Pulau Pinang	13th
Lutfyah Binti Sheikh Omar	23	Johor Bahru, Johor	12th
Muhammad Shauqi Naaim Bin Salmi	18	Gerik, Perak	11th
Muhammad Faisal Bin Abdullah	21	Kuala Lumpur	10th
Siti Norsaida Binti Tarudin	32	Kuala Lipis, Pahang	9th
Hairina Binti Abd Halim	44	Selangor	8th
Mohamad Aliff Bin Mohd Razali	22	Pulau Pinang	7th
Stanley Maringai David Impi	25	Kuching, Sarawak	6th
Nadia Haswani Binti Hasnan	18	Kuala Lumpur	5th
Khairul Nizam Bin Baharom	31	Johor Bahru, Johor	4th
Ahmad Nubhan Bin Ahmad	22	Kuala Pilah, Negeri Sembilan	3rd
Mohammed Idris Bin Mohd. Zaizizi	22	Gerik, Perak	Runner-up
Stacy Angie Anam	18	Kota Kinabalu, Sabah	Winner

== Summaries ==
=== Elimination chart ===
Voting Result in Rank Order
Order	Weekly Concerts									
Order	1	2	3	4	5	6	7	8	9	10
1	Stanly	Stacy	Stacy	Alif	Alif	Stacy	Stacy	Nubhan	Toi	Stacy
2	Stacy	Stanly	Alif	Stacy	Stacy	Riz	Stanly	Riz	Stacy	Riz
3	Nadia	Nadia	Stanly	Stanly	Riz	Nubhan	Nadia	Stacy	Nubhan	Nubhan
4	Saida	Alif	Rina	Riz	Nubhan	Toi	Riz	Stanly	Riz	Toi
5	Riz	Nubhan	Nadia	Saida	Stanly	Stanly	Nubhan	Toi	Nadia	Nadia
6	Faisal	Riz	Riz	Nadia	Nadia	Nadia	Toi	Nadia	Stanly	
7	Naim	Saida	Nubhan	Nubhan	Toi	Alif	Alif			
8	Rina	Faisal	Saida	Toi	Rina	Rina				
9	Alif	Rina	Faisal	Rina	Saida					
10	Toi	Toi	Toi	Faisal						
11	Nubhan	Naim	Naim							
12	Ika	Lufya	Lufya							
13	Lufya	Ika								
14	Yana									

The student won the competition
The student was the first runner-up
The student was the second runner-up
The students were finalists
The student was the original eliminee but was saved
The student was eliminated

- In week 3, the theme of the concert was rock ballad. Additionally, there was a double elimination.
- In week 4, the Principal gave a new song to Stacy which was composed especially for her for due to her significant improvement in the past three concerts. However, it was later found out that the song was a cover song by Bob AF2 which is entitled "Cinta Terhalang".
- In week 7, the concert was held at Panggung Sari, Istana Budaya. The theme of the concert was original motion picture soundtrack.
- Week 8 featured a non-elimination concert. The accumulated votes were forwarded to the following week.

== Cast members ==
=== Hosts ===
- AC Mizal - Host of AF Concert
- Sarimah Ibrahim - Host of AF Diary
- Zainal Alam Kadir - Host of AF Diary EXT

=== Professional Trainers ===
- Ramli M.S. - Principal & Music Director
- Shafizawati Sharif - Vocal Technical
- Siti Hajar Ismail - Vocal Presentation
- Genervie Kam - Music & Vocal
- Linda Jasmine - Choreographer
- Fatimah Abu Bakar - English Language & Motivator
- Fauziah Nawi - Drama & Presentation
- Anita Sarawak - Stage Presentation
- Jasmi Rejab - Fashion Stylist

=== Judges ===
- Fauziah Dato' Ahmad Daud
- Ning Baizura

== Season statistics ==
- Total number of students: 14
- Oldest student: Hairina Abdul Halim, 44 years old
- Youngest students: Nadia Haswani Hasnan & Stracie Angie Anam, both 18 years old
- Tallest student: Muhammad Shauqi Naaim Salmi, 6'0" (183 cm)
- Shortest student: Nadia Haswani Hasnan, 4'9" (152 cm)
- Heaviest student: Mohammad Idris Zaizizi, 172 lbs (78 kg)
- Lightest students: Ika Nabila Abdul Rahim & Siti Norsaida Tarudin, both 106 lb (46 kg)
- Students with the most collective highest votes: Stracie Angie Anam, 5 times
- Students with the most consecutive highest votes: Mohammad Alif Mohd Razali & Stracie Angie Anam, both 2 times
- Top 3's vote mean (excluding finale): Stracie Angie Anam - 1.67, Mohammad Idris Zaizizi - 4.0, Ahmad Nubhan Ahmad - 4.90
- Top 3's vote median (excluding finale): Stracie Angie Anam - 2, Mohammad Idris Zaizizi - 4, Ahmad Nubhan Ahmad - 5
- Student with the most collective bottom two appearances: Lutfyah Sheikh Omar & Hairina Abdul Halim, both 3 times
- Student with the most consecutive bottom two appearances: Lutfyah Sheikh Omar & Hairina Abdul Halim, both 3 times
- Students with no bottom two appearances: Ahmad Nubhan Ahmad, Mohammad Idris Zaizizi & Stracie Angie Anam
