= Noraniza Idris =

Malaysian singer (born 1968)

T. Noraniza Idris
- نور النساء إدريس
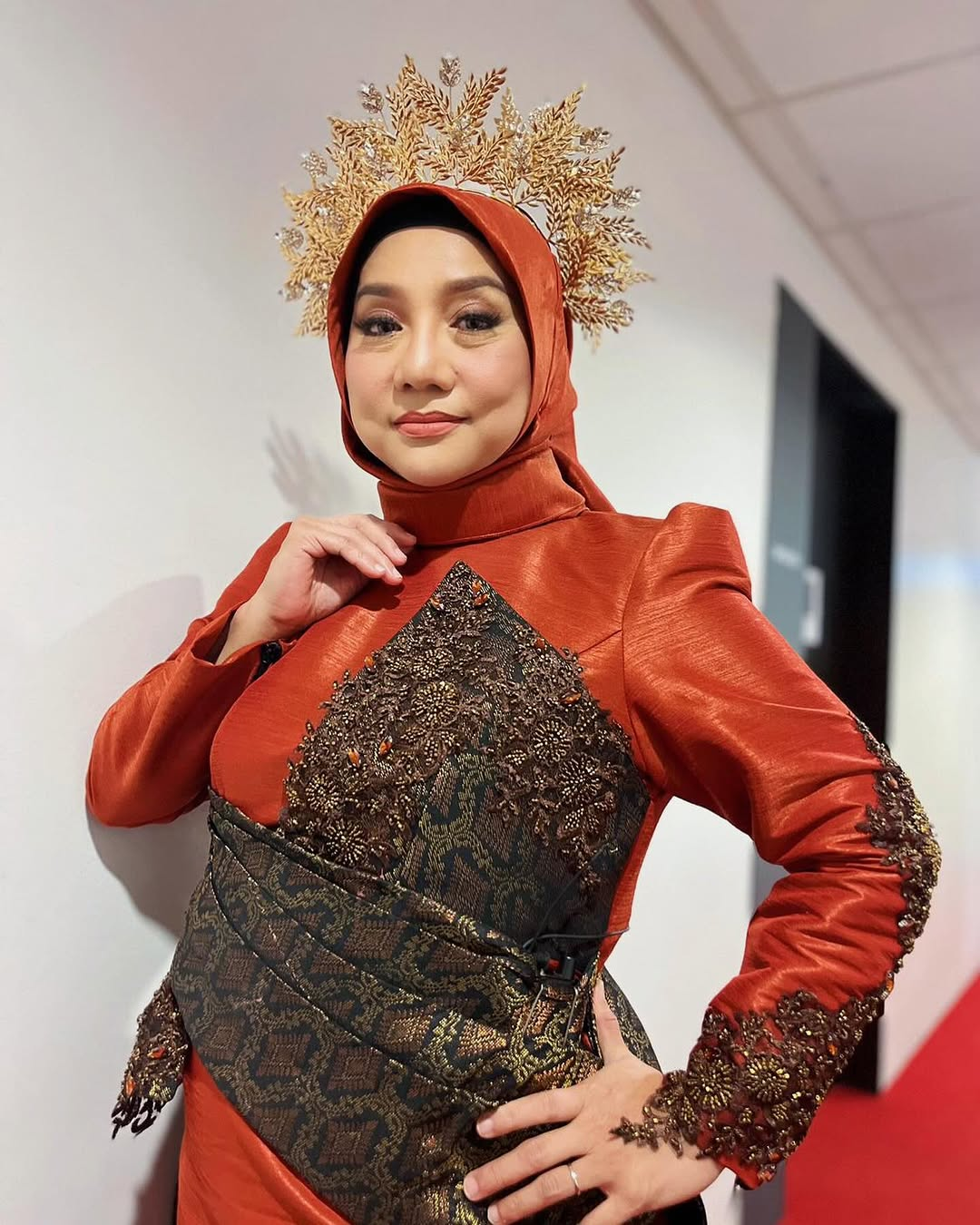
- Queen Of Ethnic Pop & Malay Traditional Malaysia
- Born: Nor Aniza binti Idris; 27 August 1968 (age 58); Kluang, Johor, Malaysia
- Other name: Kak Ani
- Occupations: Singer, actor
- Years active: 1985–present
- Musical career
- Genres: Pop; Dangdut; Irama Malaysia; Ethnic pop
- Instrument: Vocals
- Labels: Life Record; Sony Music; Suria Records; Universal Music

Nor Aniza binti Haji Idris (born 27 August 1968) in the Malaysian music industry, is known in her home country as the "Queen of Ethnic Pop". The genre she plays is known as "irama Malaysia", which fuses local traditional genres with Anglo-American pop music. Lyrically, her music includes references to the revival of traditional Malay music. She began her career as a wedding singer, and soon found herself in the recording studio after participating the Bintang RTM (a talent search singing contest) in 1985.

Throughout her musical career, she has released 13 solo albums, as well as several compilation and duet albums. At the same time, Noraniza has achieved considerable success at major national music awards through her albums, songs and live performances. To this day, she remains a steadfast figure in the arts scene, championing cultural rhythms. Her passion for championing traditional music shows no sign of waning; Noraniza has no intention of stopping, but is instead driving a movement to ensure that this source of Malay pride continues to thrive in the digital age.

== Early life ==
Nor Aniza binti Idris was born on 27 August 1968 in Kampung Melayu, Kluang, Johor. The daughter of a boria singer and a Qur'an reciter, she is the sixth of twelve siblings. She received her early education at Sekolah Tengku Mahmud 1, Kluang, and subsequently pursued her studies at Kluang Higher Secondary School.

Initially, Noraniza began to sing, which was recognised by her father from the age of eleven. It all started when her father asked her to help pluck the grey hairs from his head; afterwards he urged her to try singing a song. He was then captivated by her voice and said that Noraniza was, in fact, a talented singer. From then on, her father entered Noraniza in the under-12 singing competition; she was still 11 at the time and took part. Unexpectedly, she won first prize in the under-12 singing competition. Even after that, she was thrilled to discover that she could sing.

Noraniza is also known as Kak Ani, her nickname. She took part in the RTM Bintang in 1983 and 1985 before recording songs for an album. During the early recording stages of Bintang RTM 1985, Hamidi Rashid, the artist manager and reporter for Life Records at the time, was taken with the softness of Noraniza Idris's voice. He approached Noraniza and her father, Idris Ahmad, as the pair were enjoying a meal in the Angkasapuri canteen. Hamidi offered Noraniza a contract with his record company, a golden opportunity even though the RTM Star competition was not yet over. After careful consideration, Noraniza's father agreed to his daughter becoming a recording artist.

Then her mother instructed her to sing Malay-rhythm songs. At that time she recorded a single in the traditional Malay pop genre. In the semi-finals of Bintang RTM 1985, Noraniza once again failed to advance to the next stage, but she did not lose heart as she had after her failure at Bintang RTM 1983. Perhaps she had matured, and moreover, Hamidi's presence was like the medicine she had been seeking all this time. And after that, Noraniza was finally signed to a contract with Life Records by her father on 1 January 1986.

== Music career ==
=== 1985–1997: Melayu Deli, Mengemis Rindu and Ala Dondang ===
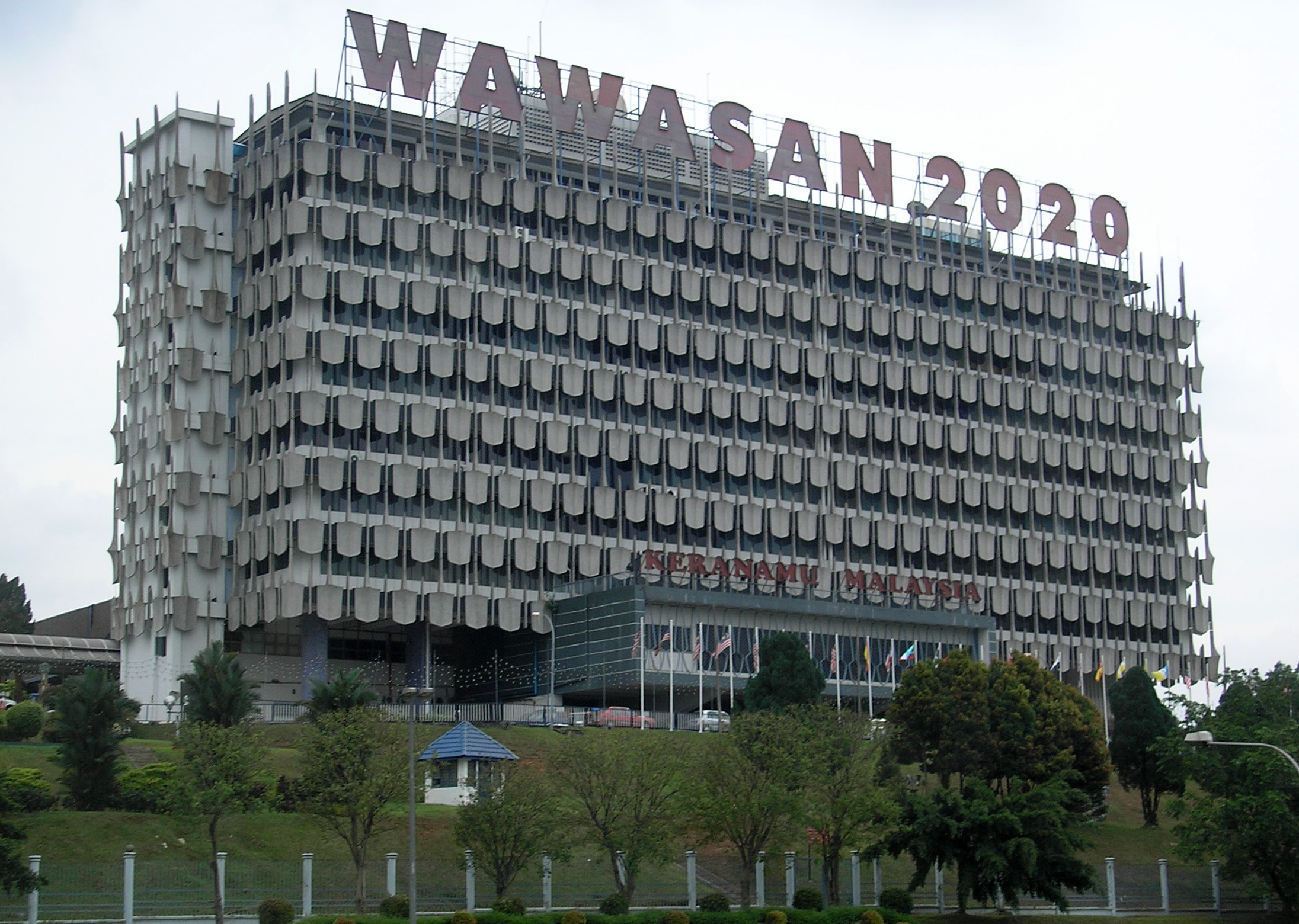
Angkasapuri, the headquarters of Radio Televisyen Malaysia (RTM), where Noraniza auditioned for the RTM star in 1983 and 1985.

Before Noraniza recorded an album, she auditioned for Bintang RTM in 1983, when she was 15 years old and made her first television appearance. However, she only reached the semi-finals and in 1985, she tried again to audition, this time at the age of 17. It was also during this early stage that she was offered a contract by Hamidi Rashid, Omar Taib, and S. Atan, who discovered Noraniza while she was with her father, Hj. Idris, enjoying a meal at his canteen. They offered Noraniza a recording contract with Life Records. because they liked the softness of Noraniza's voice, although the RTM star audition was not yet over, her father thought it over carefully, also considering and reminding Noraniza that she was taking her Malaysian Education Certificate (SPM) in Kluang, Johor. After her father had given it his full consideration, he eventually agreed to Noraniza becoming a recording artist.

After Melayu Deli, Noraniza Idris recorded the 10 Pujaan Malindo album in two volumes in 1986 and 1987. Her popularity grew further when she recorded her own songs on three Malay pop albums: Mengemis Rindu, Inginku Sandarkan Harapan and Masihkah Dirimu Menyayangiku. Noraniza then signed a contract with the international record label Sony Music. in 1991, which gave her the opportunity to work with the renowned producer Ramli M. S.. Her debut album with Sony Music was a duet album with the famous pop singer Ibnor Riza, titled Seindah Budimu.

After that, she began recording songs from classic Malay films on the album 'Lagu-lagu dari Filem dan Kenangan Lama', in nine volumes with Abdullah Chik, after her pairing with Ibnor did not receive as favourable a reception as her collaboration with Abdullah Chik. Sony Music subsequently released an ethnic pop album titled Noraniza Idris in 1992, produced by Ramli M.S and Jimmy Ali, which paved the way for Noraniza to experiment with contemporary ethnic music. However, the album did not receive a favourable reception as the traditional music market was still at a conventional stage.

After that album, Noraniza remained active singing alongside Abdullah Chik, even though she had left Sony Music. However, on 19 September 1995, while performing on stage in Kota Bharu, Kelantan, Abdullah Chik collapsed backstage and passed away, later confirmed to have been due to a heart attack. Abdullah Chik's body was taken to Kuala Lumpur and buried in the Islamic cemetery in Petaling Jaya. Since then, Noraniza has been somewhat melancholic and lacks the enthusiasm to continue promoting traditional Malay rhythms.

After three years of silence to focus on her family. In 1996, since she had left her previous record label, Sony Music Malaysia was a new record company looking for artists skilled in recording albums in the Malaysian Melody style. At that time, the label approached Noraniza's home, and after lengthy discussions they were determined to sign her as a recording artist. After lengthy discussions with her family, Noraniza eventually agreed. In 1996, she signed a contract with her new record label, Suria Records. Then in 1997, Noraniza Idris released an experimental album with a traditional pop flavour. Her collaboration with the renowned traditional album producer Suhaimi Mohd Zain, better known as Pak Ngah, proved to be a fortunate one. Thus, the album Ala Dondang was born, produced on the belief of Suria Records. (SRC). Due to its overwhelming reception, the album sold over 200,000 copies. Unexpectedly, Noraniza's songs were played on the radio. Noraniza received many accolades, including winning Best Ethnic Pop Album at the 1998 Anugerah Industri Muzik (Music Industry Awards). and her first single, "Awallah Dondang", could take her to the final stage of the 1997 Juara Lagu Awards (Anugerah Juara Lagu 1997).

=== 1998–2001: Masyhur, Seri Balas and Iktiraf ===
Following the release of the album Ala Dondang, Noraniza was initially concerned about continuing with her traditional Malay pop songs for her next album, as she wanted to release further traditional Malay pop songs with a fresh new sound. However, Noraniza continued to record albums with a traditional pop sound, such as Masyhur and her duet album with the singer Siti Nurhaliza, Seri Balas. Noraniza is recognised as a pioneer of Ethnic and Traditional Pop music for her boldness in releasing traditional albums in an unconventional manner, as she had done previously. It was during this period that the songs which cemented Noraniza Idris’s reputation emerged, including traditional pop tracks such as “Dikir Puteri, “Dondang Dendang”, “Zapin Pusaka” and a duet with Siti Nurhaliza on the track “Hati Kama”.

After receiving an award, they performed the song “Dikir Puteri” at the 1998 Commonwealth Games alongside Siti Nurhaliza, who also performed her hit song, “Cindai”. The two were brought together to collaborate on a special duet album with a traditional pop concept, entitled Seri Balas. Having successfully raised the profile of traditional pop music in the public eye through this duet album, Noraniza and Siti attracted a wider audience of traditional pop music fans from all walks of life, sparking a phenomenon. Their collaboration had a massive impact on the Malaysian music industry at the time, not only in Malaysia but also in neighbouring countries such as Singapore and Indonesia. Fortune favoured Noraniza and Siti when the song “Hati Kama” made it to the shortlist for the Best Song category, whilst the album Seri Balas went on to win Best Ethnic Pop Album and Best Album at the Music Industry Awards 2000. Furthermore, Noraniza and Siti’s magnificent performance of “Hati Kama” also secured them the title in the Creative Ethnic category at the Anugerah Juara Lagu 2000. On her next album, Noraniza Idris introduced a fresh approach by incorporating songs with traditional indigenous elements. This led to the release of the song Ngajat Tampi, composed by Rosli Selasih and featured on the album Bekaba; the album also included Tinting, a song based on the hadrah concept and the first single from Bekaba, composed by Pak Ngah. Both songs successfully reached the final round of the Anugerah Juara Lagu 2000. Noraniza became the first artist to reach the final with two songs.

Noraniza went on to release a series of albums that experimented extensively with world music, earning her the title of 'Queen of Traditional Pop'. In 2000, she released another traditional pop-style album entitled Iktiraf. For this album, Noraniza once again collaborated with Pak Ngah. The album Iktiraf was nominated for Best Ethnic Pop Album, Best Vocal Performance on an Album (Female) and Best Song for the track “Iboq (Kita)” at the 2001 Music Industry Awards (Anugerah Industri Muzik).

=== 2002–2009: Aura, Sawo' Matang and other projects ===
In 2002, seeing that Noraniza was no longer collaborating with composers, Pak Ngah released the album Aura. This time, Noraniza appointed Fareez Tajudin—who was also her husband at the time—to take on the role of producer and serve as the main driving force behind the album. The album Aura marked the starting point for local music fans to recognise her ability to stand firmly on her own two feet within the local music scene. Noraniza wanted to be true to herself and, for that reason, she was willing to spend months in the studio to ensure the recording of the Aura album ran smoothly. Noraniza said she was fully committed to the production of the album, starting from sourcing songs and conducting research on the ethnic music featured. In her view, once she had decided to commit 100 per cent to the album’s production, she needed to demonstrate a high level of commitment. Noraniza did not want anyone to regard her as a flash in the pan. Because she was so meticulous, Noraniza and her husband faced various challenges and trials,

In Aura, fans will no longer hear Noraniza performing songs written by Pak Ngah. Instead, fans have the opportunity to assess her collaborations with several artists. Adnan Abu Hassan, known for his mainstream pop songs, contributes a masri song entitled “Layar Batutta”. Noraniza has also included composer Eddie Hamid, who has inspired a song with an Eastern musical rhythm, “Hala Timur”. Several tracks feature the lyricist, Hairul Anuar Harun. Noraniza says that the album Aura, with its ‘ethnic fusion’ concept, is a truly special album. Noraniza is confident that it will not disappoint her fans. Noraniza mempersembahkan buat kali pertamanya lagu Hatinya Tak Tahan di hadapan penonton yang dihadiri melebihi 16,000 ribu di Konsert Countdown KLCC 2004 yang berlangsung di KLCC Park, Kuala Lumpur. Ternyata lagu yang dicipta oleh Noraniza sendiri membawa tuah apabila lagu Hatinya Tak Tahan berjaya meraih anugerah Persembahan Terbaik di Anugerah Juara Lagu ke-19 dan memenangi Lagu Global Pilihan di Anugerah Era 2004.

Following the end of the ‘Sawo’ Matang’ era, Noraniza Idris released a special compilation album to mark her 20 years in the music industry, namely Lenggok 20 Tahun, which was released in 2006. The album features two new tracks, "Racau Sang Khalifah" and "Asyik Bisikan Hubah". It also includes a reworked version of an old track, "Dayung Sampan", featuring erhu player He Yun, who was specially flown in from China, and ‘Mengemis Rindu’, which has been re-recorded with a fresh new sound.

Also in 2008, Noraniza Idris released a festive song entitled "Cinta Lebaran", featuring the group Akasia, whose talents had been discovered on the reality TV programme Gangstarz. Noraniza said that this was her first single since she began wearing the hijab. Furthermore, that same year saw Noraniza Idris honoured when her songs were selected to represent the concept of Contemporary Malay music in the reality competition Sehati Berdansa Season 2. Her songs were chosen for dance performances by all the programme’s contestants, who consisted of Malaysian celebrity couples. Noraniza also served as a guest judge on the evening.

After a long period without releasing any albums or songs, in 2009 Noraniza once again satisfied her fans’ longing by launching a single blending ethnic and hip-hop styles, entitled "Enjut". The song "Enjut" was composed by Cat Farish, Illegal and Adeeb, with lyrics by Ahmad Fedtri Yahya. It served as the lead single ahead of the release of her 13th studio album, Cintaku Satu, in 2010. Although there was some controversy suggesting the song contained suggestive elements, ‘Enjut’ was recognised as Best Ethnic Pop Song at the 17th Music Industry Awards (AIM17) (Anugerah Industri Muzik ke-17) and was also nominated in the Best Song category. Enjut’s song also made it to the semi-finals of Muzik-Muzik 24 but failed to reach the final.

== Discography ==
=== Studio albums ===
1. 10 Pujaan Malindo Vol.1
2. 10 Pujaan Malindo Vol.2
3. Mengemis Rindu
4. Inginku Sandarkan Harapan
5. Masihkah Diriku Menyayangiku
6. Noraniza Idris
7. Ala Dondang
8. Masyhur
9. Bekaba
10. Iktiraf
11. Aura
12. Sawo' Matang
13. Cintaku Satu

=== Studio albums ===
Album	Song	Composer	Lyricist
Ala Dondang (1997)	1. Awallah Dondang; 2. Semalu Rimba; 3. Joget Orang Berkasih; 4. Rindu; 5. Mustika Hati; 6. Purnama; 7. Mahligai Asli; 8. Padamu Jua; 9. Embun Setitik; 10. Inang Merindu	Anak Sarawak; Khalil Sharif; S. Atan; Fandi; Pak Atan Ahmad; Rahim Jantan; Pak Ngah; Jamal Abdullah; Arid; Pak Ngah	Hairul Anuar Harun; Hairul Anuar Harun; Siso; Siso; Pak Atan Ahmad; Rahim Jantan; Lokgha; Habsah Hassan; Hairul Anuar Harun; Lokgha
Masyhur (1998)	1. Gurindam Masyhur; 2. Dikir Puteri; 3. Joget Berkias Kasih; 4. Di Anjung Rindu; 5. Joget Mengindam Rindu; 6. Permata Kasih; 7. Zapin Pusaka; 8. Lat Tali Lat; 9. Dendang Anak; 10. Kisah Satu Malam; 11. Dondang Dendang	–; Pak Ngah; S. Atan; Rahim Jantan; Raja Kobat; S.M. Noor; Fadzil Ahmad; Kazar Saisi; Ahmad Jusoh; Anak Sarawak; Pak Ngah Temberang	–; Hairul Anuar Harun; Siso; Nurul Asyiqin; Raja Kobat; Nurul Asyiqin; Megamutiara; Kazar Saisi; Ahmad Jusoh; Hairul Anuar Harun; Hairul Anuar Harun
Bekaba (1999)	1. Tinting; 2. Ngajat Tampi; 3. Panji Sumandak; 4. Sapta; 5. Ya Kasih; 6. Si Nara; 7. Joget Si Kaduk Junjung; 8. Laksana Dikata; 9. Sang Puteri; 10. Selat Tebrau	Pak Ngah; Rosli Selasih; Pu'ki; Manan Ngah; To'ki/Jamal Abdillah; Pak Ngah; –; –; Rosli Selasih; –	Hairul Anuar Harun; Siso; Tok Wan; Hairul Anuar Harun; To'ki; Hairul Anuar Harun; –; –; Siso; –
Iktiraf (2000)	1. Iboq; 2. Manira; 3. Laduni; 4. Malinja; 5. Logamaya; 6. Empat Dara; 7. Dewangga; 8. Kuala Mersing; 9. Ya Salam; 10. Joget Dondang Sayang	Indra; Pak Ngah/Fadhil Ahmad; –; –; –; –; –; –; Anak Johor; Raja Kobat	Indra/Siso; Ce'Kem; –; –; –; –; –; –; Ce'Kem; Raja Kobat
Aura (2002)	1. Hala Timur; 2. Tandang Bermadah; 3. Serampang Bugis; 4. Layar Battuta; 5. Berendoi; 6. Putera Lantai Emas; 7. Syakuntala; 8. Hijrah Kencana; 9. Melereng; 10. Raja Alang	Eddie Hamid; Noraniza Idris/Nawawi CD; Raja Kobat; Adnan Abu Hassan; Rosli Selasih; Indra; Anak Johor; Indra; Rosli Selasih; Rosiah Chik	ND Lala; Raja Kobat/Noraniza Idris; Raja Kobat; Hairul Anuar Harun; Rosli Selasih/Noraniza Idris; Nane Surya; Hairul Anuar Harun; Adika; Sulastri Siri; Rosiah Chik
Sawo' Matang (2004)	1. Sama Tak Serupa duet: David Arumugam Alleycats; 2. Hatinya Tak Tahan; 3. Di Kenang Jangan Di Sebut Jangan; 4. Penawar Rindu; 5. Ayuh! Jurangan; 6. Rajuk Rindu; 7. Dondang Di Sayang; 8. Puteri Ledang; 9. Zapin Beradat; 10. Indung Anak Melayu; 11. Atine Ora Tahan; 12. Juklah! Guru Abe	Raja Kobat; Noraniza Idris; Datuk Ibrahim Bachek; Atan Ahmad; Noraniza Idris; Noraniza Idris; Fareez Tajudin; Pak Lomak; –; Dhani Wahyuni; Noraniza Idris; Noraniza Idris	Darwish/Nurul Asyikin; Siso; Datuk Ibrahim Bachek/Rosli; Atan Ahmad; Ahmad Fedtri Yahya; Nurul Asyikin; Dol Shafiq; Ahmad Fedtri Yahya/Noraniza Idris; Dol Shafiq; Siso; Muhaji; Pand

=== Duet/compilation albums ===
Album	Song	Duet Artist	Composer	Lyricist
Seri Balas (1999)	1. Hati Kama; 2. Ketawa Lagi; 3. Lenggang-Lenggok; 4. Dondang Dendang; 5. Ya Allah Ya Saidi; 6. Merak Disangkar; 7. Pasir Salak	Siti Nurhaliza; Siti Nurhaliza; Siti Nurhaliza; Siti Nurhaliza	Pak Ngah; –; Fadzil Ahmad; Pak Ngah; Fadzil Ahmad; –; Ku Zahir Ku Ahmad	Hairul Anuar Harun; –; Hairul Anuar Harun/Siti Nurhaliza; Hairul Anuar Harun; Megamutiara; Nul Afdal; Nur Afdal/J. Jamal
Lenggok 20 Tahun (2006)	1. Asyik Bisikan Hubah; 2. Syair; 3. Tandang Bermadah; 4. Kisah Barat; 5. Mengemis Rindu I 6. Mengemis Rindu II; 7. Asmara; 8. Ayuh Juragan; 9. Gurindam; 10. Racau Sang Khalifah; 11. Dayung Sampan; 12. Inginku Sandarkan Harapan; 13. Debak Debuk; 14. Anak Tani; 15. Rindunya Setengah Mati; 16. Diari Cinta; 17. Mengulek; 18. Si Jantung Hati; 19. Arus Sejenak Bahagia; 20. Air Mata; 21. Bunga Kasih Terkulai Layu; 22. Jangan Buat Lagi; 23. Bukan Aku Di Hati Mu; 24. Bulan Ditutup Awan	Bob AF 2; Liza Hanim	–; –; –; –; –; –; –; –; –; Karim / Noraniza Idris; –; –; –; –; –; –; –; –; –; –; –; –; –; –	–; –; –; –; –; –; –; –; –; Ahmad Fedtri Yahya; –; –; –; –; –; –; –; –; –; –; –; –; –; –

== Filmography ==
=== Film ===
Year	Title	Role	Notes	Ref.
1988	Sayang Ibu			

== Awards and Accolades ==
=== Anugerah Industri Muzik ===
Anugerah Industri Muzik Malaysia (AIM)
Year	Category	Nominees	Albums	Result
1997: (AIM 5)	Best Album	Ala Dondang	Ala Dondang	Nominated
1997: (AIM 5)	Best Ethnic Pop Album	Ala Dondang	Ala Dondang	Won
1998: (AIM 6)	Best Album	Masyhur	Masyhur	Nominated
1998: (AIM 6)	Best Ethnic Pop Album	Masyhur	Masyhur	Won
1998: (AIM 6)	Best Vocal Performance in an Album (Female)	Noraniza Idris	Masyhur	Nominated
1999: (AIM 7)	Best Song	Hati Kama duet with Siti Nurhaliza; Pak Ngah / Hairul Anuar Harun	Seri Balas	Nominated
1999: (AIM 7)	Best Album	Seri Balas	Seri Balas	Won
1999: (AIM 7)	Best Ethnic Pop Album	Seri Balas	Seri Balas	Won
1999: (AIM 7)	Best Ethnic Pop Album	Bekaba	Bekaba	Nominated
2000: (AIM 8)	Best Song	Iboq; Indra / Siso	Iktiraf	Nominated
2000: (AIM 8)	Best Ethnic Pop Album	Iktiraf	Iktiraf	Nominated
2000: (AIM 8)	Best Vocal Performance in an Album (Female)	Noraniza Idris	Iktiraf	Nominated
2002: (AIM 10)	Best Ethnic Pop Album	Aura	Aura	Nominated
2004: (AIM 12)	Best Album	Sawo Matang	Sawo Matang	Nominated
2004: (AIM 12)	Best Ethnic Pop Album	Sawo Matang	Sawo Matang	Won
2004: (AIM 12)	Best Album Cover	Sawo Matang	Sawo Matang	Nominated
2009: (AIM 17)	Best Song	Enjut duet with The Fabulous Cats; Illegall & Cat Farish / Ahmad Fedtri Yahya	Enjut; Cintaku Satu	Nominated
2009: (AIM 17)	Best Ethnic Pop Song	Enjut duet with The Fabulous Cats; Illegall & Cat Farish / Ahmad Fedtri Yahya	Enjut; Cintaku Satu	Won
2012: (AIM 19)	Best Song	Kuasa Cinta duet with Black Hanafiah; Edrie Hashim/ Ahmad Fedhtri Yahya	Cintaku Satu	Nominated
2012: (AIM 19)	Best Ethnic Pop Song	Kuasa Cinta duet with Black Hanafiah; Edrie Hashim/ Ahmad Fedhtri Yahya	Cintaku Satu	Won
2012: (AIM 19)	Best Ethnic Pop Song	Endang Endong Cintaku Satu; Wan Mohd Rogan / Noraniza Idris/ Ahmad Fedtri Yahya	Cintaku Satu	Nominated
2012: (AIM 19)	Best Ethnic Pop Song	Hari Demi Hari featuring Karen Tan & Dior Shaari; Dior Shaari / Noraniza Idris/ Ahmad Fedtri Yahya	Cintaku Satu	Nominated
2012: (AIM 19)	Best Ethnic Pop Song	Mahligai duet with Jaclyn Victor; Helen Yap / Ahmad Fedtri Yahya	Cintaku Satu	Nominated
2012: (AIM 19)	Best Ethnic Pop Song	Menarik Hati duet with Marsha Londoh; Asmin Mudin / Ahmad Fedtri Yahya	Cintaku Satu	Nominated

=== Anugerah Juara Lagu ===
Anugerah Juara Lagu (AJL)
Year	Song	Album	Composer	Lyrics	Category	Result
1997 (AJL 12)	Awallah Dondang	Ala Dondang	Anak Sarawak	Hairul Anuar Harun	Irama Malaysia / Etnik Kreatif	Nominated
1998 (AJL 13)	Dikir Puteri	Masyhur	Pak Ngah	Hairul Anuar Harun	Irama Malaysia / Etnik Kreatif	Won: Best Performance
1999(AJL 14)	Dondang Dendang	Masyhur	Pak Ngah	Hairul Anuar Harun	Irama Malaysia / Etnik Kreatif	Won: Best Performance
1999(AJL 14)	Hati Kama; Duet with Siti Nurhaliza	Seri Balas	Pak Ngah	Hairul Anuar Harun	Irama Malaysia / Etnik Kreatif	Won: Category Champion
2000(AJL 15)	Tinting	Bekaba	Pak Ngah	Hairul Anuar Harun	Irama Malaysia / Etnik Kreatif	Nominated
2000(AJL 15)	Ngajat Tampi	Bekaba	Rosli Selasih	Siso	Irama Malaysia / Etnik Kreatif	Won: Best Performance
2002(AJL 17)	Hala Timur	Aura	Eddie Hamid	ND Lala	Irama Malaysia / Etnik Kreatif	Nominated
2003(AJL 18)	Tandang Bermadah	Aura	Noraniza Idris & Narawi CD	Raja Kobat & Noraniza Idris	Irama Malaysia / Etnik Kreatif	Nominated
2004(AJL 19)	Hatinya Tak Tahan	Sawo Matang	Noraniza Idris	Siso	Irama Malaysia / Etnik Kreatif	Won: Best Performance
2005(AJL 20)	Ayuh! Juragan	Sawo Matang	Noraniza Idris	Ahmad Fedtri Yahya	Irama Malaysia / Etnik Kreatif	Nominated
2022(AJL 36)	Intan Payung; Feat with Bunga		Luca Sickta & Bunga	Bunga		Nominated

=== Anugerah Bintang Popular ===
Anugerah Bintang Popular Berita Harian (ABPBH)
Year	Category	Result
1988	Popular Female Singer	Nominated
1997/98	Popular Female Singer	Nominated
1998/99	Popular Female Singer	Nominated
2000	Popular Female Singer	Nominated
