= Akademi Fantasia season 7 =

Akademi Fantasia
- Season 7
- Hosted by: AC Mizal; Sarimah Ibrahim
- Judges: Adlin Aman Ramlie; Edry Hashim; Dato' Khadijah Ibrahim
- Winner: Mohd Hafiz Mohd Suip
- Runner-up: Khairil Azam Pilus
- Finals venue: Putra Indoor Stadium

Release
- Original network: Astro Ria
- Original release: 9 March – 16 May 2009

Season chronology
- ← Previous; Season 6 Next → Season 8

The seventh season of Akademi Fantasia premiered on 9 March 2009 and continued until 16 May 2009 on the Astro Ria television channel. AC Mizal continued to host the show, while Adlin Aman Ramlie, Edry Hashim and Dato' Khadijah Ibrahim joined the judging panel following the departures of Fauziah Ahmad Daud and Ning Baizura. The promotional catch phrase of this season is "Bring Out Your Self-Transformation".

On 10 February 2009, Astro management released the list of professional trainers who would take charge of this season's contestants. Tiara Jacquelina was revealed to be the Principal for this season, marking the first time ever a woman to be given the role as the Principal.

On 16 May 2009, Mohd Hafiz Mohd Suip from Kuching, Sarawak became the winner of the seventh season of Akademi Fantasia, who defeated Khairil Azam Pilus. This season also featured Afiq Hakim Ahmad, who would subsequently become the overall winner of 2015 Anugerah Juara Lagu.

As much as 3.9 million votes were cast throughout this season.

== Changes from Season 6 ==
According to the manager of Astro Ria, Khairul Mizan, this season was opened to not only Malaysian citizen, but also to Singaporean citizen. The rationale behind the eligibility of Singaporean citizen to participate in this show was meant to broaden the influence of Astro in Singapore through the popularity of the show which is broadcast through mio TV.

Apart from that, this season was also eligible to established performers who wished to participate in the show. However, the opportunity would only be given to those who are not embedded with any recording or management contracts.

There were also changes in the line-up of this season's professional trainers. Linda Jasmine, who has been the choreographer of Akademi Fantasia since the first season was being replaced by A. Aris Kadir. Ida Nerina served as the students' Acting & Drama coach, replacing Fauziah Nawi. Lastly, Hashridz Murshim was in charge of the music composition which was previously held by Ramli M.S.

== Auditions ==
Auditions were held in the following cities:

- Kompleks Sukan Bukit Jalil, Kuala Lumpur - 17 January & 18 January
- The Zon Regency Hotel, Johor Bahru - 25 & 25 January
- 1Borneo South Atrium, Kota Kinabalu, Sabah - 30 & 31 January & 1 February
- Enter K Entertainment, Crown Tower Kuching, Sarawak - 31 January & 1 February
- Kompleks Sukan Bukit Jalil, Kuala Lumpur - 7 & 8 February

=== List of songs during auditions ===
Songs for female

- No One – Alicia Keys
- Kalis Rindu - Elyana
- Dikir Puteri - Noraniza Idris
- Karma - Cokelat
- Tari Silat Melayu - Aishah

Songs for male

- Angan Dan Sedar – Mawi
- You Raise Me Up – Josh Groban
- Ketulusan Hati – Anuar Zain
- Hanya Engkau Yang Mampu – Aizat AF5
- Ada – M. Nasir

Contestants were required to be between the ages of 18 and 45, and are Malaysian and Singaporean citizens who are not embedded with recording or management contracts.

== Semi-finalists ==
The top 20 finalists were announced in a special press conference held at Park Royal Hotel, Kuala Lumpur, on 3 March 2009. All of them participated the Orientation Week as well as the Musical Camp (MOKM) which involved guidance classes and qualification assessment such as vocal (technique), vocal (performance), dance, acting and et cetera for six consecutive days.

Those who displayed promising performances would be enlisted to Akademi Fantasia. The final selection was revealed in the second episode of Tirai Akademi Fantasia which commenced on 7 & 8 March 2009. Below is the list of semi-finalists who did not make it to Top 14.

- Abdul Hamim bin Haji Suleiman, 21, Johor Bahru, Johor
- Abraham Edwin "AB" Dungot, 26, Ranau, Sabah
- Cabrine "Cabbie" Blaire Bernard Solibun, 20, Kota Kinabalu, Sabah
- Alpaezah "Faezah" binti Manaf, 20, Keningau, Sabah
- Kelana bin Ayu, 40, Bintulu, Sarawak
- Lizda Nuryanti binti Abidin, 27, Tawau, Sabah

== Concert summaries ==
=== Week 1 - Student's choice ===
Original Airdate: 14 March 2009

The first concert of the season depicted several changes in the show to denote the idea of "transformation" which was related to the theme of this season. The students were introduced in a more charismatic way with the removal of self-tagline. They were also assigned with songs of their choices. Also, the students sang and performed "Menuju Puncak" at the beginning of the concert, unlike past seasons in which students usually performed the theme song at the end of the concert before the elimination process took place.

Student	Song	Result
Adila	"Di Bawah Pohon Asmara" by Jaclyn Victor	Bottom 3
Aishah	"Dan Sebenarnya" by Yuna	Safe
Akim	"Hatiku Kau Luka" by Alleycats	Safe
Aril	"Rahasia Perempuan" by Ari Lasso	Safe
Claudia	"Sempurna" by Andra and The BackBone	Safe
Hafiz	"Lagu Kita" by Aizat	Safe
Isma	"Sepi" by Yuni Shara	Safe
Obri	"Jeritan Batinku" by P. Ramlee	Safe
Qhaud	"Phoenix Bangkit" by M. Nasir	Safe
Rini	"Elegi Sepi" by Azharina	Bottom 3
Rubisa	"Matahariku" by Agnes Monica	Safe
Sidi	"Terima Kasih Cinta" by Afgan	Saved
Yazid	"Penghujung Rindu" by Jamal Abdillah	Safe
Zizi	"Molek" by Elyana	Safe

During concert, Aril, Isma, Adila and Hafiz were commanded for their strong performance. Rini was criticized for choosing a song that did not compliment her voice while Sidi's lack of emotion due to his nervousness did not sit well with the judges. Despite a strong performance, Adila landed in the bottom two with Sidi when the voting line was closed at the end of the concert. However, it was announced that there would be no elimination in this concert.

=== Week 2 - Medleys ===
Original Airdate: 21 March 2009

The second week began as the students were given the songs they were going to perform for the week. Unlike the previous week, they did not get the chance to sing the song of their own choices. Instead, they were assigned with not one but two songs and were required to perform it as a medley. This marks the first time ever in Akademi Fantasia history whereby the students were given two songs to sing as a medley individually.

Student	Songs	Result
Adila	"Merawat Cinta Terpendam" by Liza Hanim "Asyik" by Amelina	Eliminated
Aishah	"Coba" by Faizal Tahir "Gila" by Mila	Safe
Akim	"Satu" by Dewa "Buronan Cinta" by The Lima	Safe
Aril	"Benar Benar" by Adam "Robot" by Adam	Safe
Claudia	"Ku Mahu" by Siti Nurhaliza "Wanita" by Siti Nurhaliza	Safe
Hafiz	"Cinta Ini Membunuhku" by D-Masiv "Toyol" by Aznil Nawawi	Safe
Isma	"Jat Da Da Da" by Dia Fadilla "Hello" by Farah Asyikin	Safe
Obri	"Akan Tiba" by Aliff "Ada Untukmu" by Nubhan	Bottom 3
Qhaud	"Bila Nak Saksi" by Spider "Lagu Untukmu" by Meet Uncle Hussain	Safe
Rini	"Aku Sindarela" by Amylea "Kiblatku" by Hazami	Bottom 3
Rubisa	"Dingin" by Ziana Zain "Gagap" by Stacy	Safe
Sidi	"Selamat Ulang Tahun Sayang" by Imran Ajmain "Kukoo" by Ferhad	Safe
Yazid	"Lelaki Ini" by Anuar Zain "Fikirlah" by Aizat	Safe
Zizi	"Sembilu" by Ella "Wonder Woman" by Mulan Jameela	Safe

During concert, Claudia was praised for her promising performance. The judges were also impressed by Hafiz for his consistent performance. Akim was lambasted for not improving his vocal techniques while Obri was criticized for being too nervous and unsure on stage. The bottom two was revealed to be Obri and Adila. At the end of the concert, Adila was eliminated for having the lowest votes when the voting session was closed.

- Special judge: Dato' Yusni Hamid

=== Week 3 - 70s & 80s ===
Original Airdate: 28 March 2009

Qhaud was chosen as the student with the best performance on last week's concert. The departure of Adila affected some of the students as they read the will that she had written for them. For this week's concert, the students were assigned with classic songs of the 70's and 80's. The theme song "Menuju Puncak" was also performed as an a capella to support the Earth Hour campaign.

Student	Song	Result
Aishah	"Mata" by Noorkumalasari	Safe
Akim	"Anak Gembala" by Sudirman	Safe
Aril	"Andainya Aku Pergi Dulu" by Alleycats	Safe
Claudia	"Lama Tak Jumpa" by Zur Eda	Safe
Hafiz	"Mat Disko" by Sudirman	Safe
Isma	"Rambu Ramba" by Nursheila Amin	Safe
Obri	"Abang Beca" by Broery Marantika	Eliminated
Qhaud	"Pilihlah Aku" by Latif Ibrahim	Safe
Rini	"Seloka Cinta Remaja" by Seha Freedom	Eliminated
Rubisa	"Angan-angan" by Raja Ema	Safe
Sidi	"Hanya Di Radio" by Headwind	Safe
Yazid	"Pawana" by Search	Bottom 3
Zizi	"Ini Rindu" by Farid Harja	Safe

The judges were very impressed with Isma's performance which was considered as very laid-back and enjoyable. Hafiz was also consistent in his performance as he proved his vocal ability to the audience. After the voting session was closed, Rini was later revealed to be in the bottom two with Obri, despite her entertaining performance which generally received positive comments from the judges. However, both of them were eliminated at the end of the concert.

- Special judge: Kharil Johari Johari

=== Week 4 - Tribute to Amy Search & Siti Nurhaliza ===
Original Airdate: 4 April 2009

The fourth week kicked off with the announcement of Isma as the best performer in the previous concert. For this week's concert, the students were assigned to sing songs that are popularized by Amy Search and Siti Nurhaliza. The twist was that the song would be assigned in reverse gender, meaning that female students would have to sing songs by Amy Search while male students would have to sing songs by Siti Nurhaliza.

Student	Song	Result
Aishah	"Mentari Di Ufuk Timur" by Amy Search	Safe
Akim	"Destinasi Cinta" by Siti Nurhaliza	Safe
Aril	"Lakaran Kehidupan" by Siti Nurhaliza	Safe
Claudia	"Suralaya Dalam D Major" by Amy Search	Safe
Hafiz	"Cinta Ini" by Siti Nurhaliza	Safe
Isma	"Kerja Gila" by Amy Search	Safe
Qhaud	"Di Taman Teman" by Siti Nurhaliza	Safe
Rubisa	"Tiada Lagi" by Mayang Sari	Eliminated
Sidi	"Ku Milikmu" by Siti Nurhaliza	Bottom 3
Yazid	"Aku Cinta Padamu" by Siti Nurhaliza	Safe
Zizi	"Aku Dah Bosan" by Amy Search	Eliminated
All (Bonus)	"Isabella" by Amy Search "Jerat Percintaan" by Siti Nurhaliza	N/A

During concert, most students received universal praise, notably Claudia, Akim, Isma and Hafiz. Qhaud had to perform his song twice due to the technical problem and despite the chance, he forgot his lyrics. This concert also witnessed the first time ever in history of AF whereby two professional trainers, Fatimah Abu Bakar and Siti Hajar Ismail, stepped forward to rebut the comments made by the juries.

The bottom two was later revealed to be Zizi and Rubisa. However, they both were sent packing in this concert since it was another double-elimination concert. This also marks the history of Akademi Fantasia whereby double elimination took place consecutively.

- Special judges: Amy Search & Siti Nurhaliza

=== Week 5 - Duet with past contestants of AF ===
Original Airdate: 11 April 2009

The remaining students reviewed their previous concert with their trainers and Akim was revealed to be the best performer in last week's concert. Then, they were given their songs for this week which required them to sing duet songs. Surprisingly, the students were given the chance to perform the duet songs with past contestants of Akademi Fantasia.

Student	Song	Duet Partner	Result
Bonus song	"Lucky" by Jason Mraz & Colbie Caillat	All students	N/A
Aishah	"Dua Hati Jadi Satu" by Gita Gutawa & Dafi	Aliff Aziz	Safe
Akim	"Jika Kau Tiada" by Yusry & Erra Fazira	Farah (AF2)	Safe
Aril	"Aku Dan Dirimu" by Ari Lasso & Bunga Citra Lestari	Marsha (AF3)	Bottom 3
Claudia	"Kau Muzik Di Hatiku" by Jaclyn Victor & Vince	Vince (AF1)	Safe
Hafiz	"Terlanjur Cinta" by Rossa & Pasha Ungu	Mila (AF5)	Safe
Isma	"Kau Mawarku" by Siti Nurhaliza & 2 By 2	Zul (2 By 2)	Safe
Qhaud	"Di Bius Cinta" by Yusry & Melly Goeslow	Heliza (AF5)	Bottom 3
Sidi	"Cinta Yang Sempurna" by 6ixth Sense & Tirta ft. Noe Letto	Zahid (AF2)	Eliminated
Yazid	"Terharu" by Jamal Abdillah & Mawi	Yazer (AF3)	Safe

Isma was given a surprise when she was reunited with her husband cum singer, Zul, who was a former vocalist of band 2 By 2. Aishah was also surprised to know that her duet partner turned out to be Aliff Aziz, and not Vince as what she was told.

At the end of the concert, Sidi became the sixth student to be eliminated from the competition in his second appearance in the bottom two. It was revealed that he landed in the bottom two with Qhaud after the concert.

- Special judge: Adibah Noor

=== Week 6 - Memoirs of bands ===
Original Airdate: 18 April 2009

The week began with Aril being announced as the best performer for last week concert. The students were then given the assigned songs for this week's concert, which required them to sing songs from four prestigious bands which are Kristal, Left-handed, Estranged, and Cokelat.

Student	Song	Result
Bonus song	"I Want to Break Free" by Queen "What I've Done" by Linkin Park	N/A
Aishah	"Mata" by Cokelat	Bottom 3
Akim	"Aurora" by Estranged	Safe
Aril	"Yang Pernah" by Estranged	Safe
Claudia	"Keindahan Pantai" by Kristal	Bottom 3
Hafiz	"Pak Belalang" by Kristal	Safe
Isma	"Salah" by Cokelat	Safe
Qhaud	"Seruan" by Left-handed	Eliminated
Yazid	"Ku Di Halaman Rindu" by Left-handed	Safe

During concert, each of the student delivered their song with the accompanying music performed by the original band they were representing. Qhaud was commanded for his improvement as it was his best performance yet. However, despite his stellar performance, he failed to attract the votes from the audience as he was eliminated at the end of the concert. It was also revealed that he landed in the bottom two with Aishah after the voting line was closed.

- Special guests: Johan & Zizan

=== Week 7 - Miscellaneous songs ===
Original Airdate: 25 April 2009

Claudia was appointed as the best performer in the previous concert. However, it was noted that if Qhaud was not eliminated, he would have shared the title with Claudia. A challenge was also conducted between the students to create a short song for Nokia.

Then, they were given the assigned songs to be performed in the seventh concert. The concert would feature no specific theme unlike previous concerts in the past six weeks. Nevertheless, for the first time in this season, some students were assigned with English songs.

Student	Song
Bonus songs	"Fiona" by 4U2C "Untukmu" by Feminin
Aishah	"Flora Cinta" by Min Malik
Akim	"Situasi" by Bunkface
Aril	"Nakal" by Gigi
Claudia	"When You're Gone" by Avril Lavigne
Hafiz	"Kau Yang Punya" by Malique & Najwa
Isma	"Tak Mungkin Kerna Sayang" by Alyah
Yazid	"With or Without You" by U2

During concert, all the male students were commanded for their improvement while the females failed to connect with their songs. However, despite his successful performance, Aril was eliminated at the end of the concert as he failed to attract the enough votes from the audience. It was also revealed that he landed in the bottom two with Claudia after the voting line was closed.

- Bottom two: Claudia Fay Geres & Khairil Azam Pilus
- Eliminated: Khairil Azam Pilus
- Special judge: Adibah Noor
- Special guests: Najwa & Fazura

=== Week 8 - Musical theaters ===
Original Airdate: 2 May 2009

The week began with Hafiz being announced as the best performer for last week concert. The students were then given the assigned songs for this week's concert, which required them to sing songs from famous musical theaters in recent year.

Student	Song	Musicals Theater
Bonus song	"Dewa Perang" "What Time Is It?"	Puteri Gunung Ledang; High School Musical
Aishah	"Slot Akasia"	Impak Maksima
Yazid	"Ratu Novella"	Impak Maksima
Akim	"Titah Sultan"	Puteri Gunung Ledang
Claudia	"Katakan"	Puteri Gunung Ledang
Isma	"Mulanya Cinta"	P. Ramlee the Musical
Hafiz	"Di Manakan Ku Cari Ganti"	P. Ramlee the Musical

During concert, most students received universal praise, notably Hafiz and Isma. The bottom two of the concert was revealed to be Claudia and Aishah. However, both of them were eliminated at the end of the concert since it was another double-elimination concert.

After the elimination, it was announced by the Principal that AFMASUK would be held in order to recruit students who had been eliminated throughout the season. This privilege was last held back in season 4.

- Bottom two: Claudia Fay Geres & Siti Aishah Bujang
- Eliminated: Claudia Fay Geres & Siti Aishah Bujang
- Special guests: Asrul RL2, Tony Yusuf & Cat Farish

=== Week 9 - Bilingual songs ===
Original Airdate: 9 May 2009

The week started off with Yazid being announced as the best performer in last week's concert. The students were then given the assigned songs for this week's concert, which required them to sing two songs; one in Malay and the other in English. The Principal also announced that the AFMASUK voting line would be closed at the beginning of the ninth concert.

Student	Malay Song	English Song
Akim	"Larut" by Dewa 19	"I'm Yours" by Jason Mraz
Hafiz	"Laskar Pelangi" by Nidji	"I Believe I Can Fly" by R. Kelly
Isma	"Aku Pasti Datang" by Bunga Citra Lestari	"Hot n Cold" by Katy Perry
Yazid	"Aku Skandal" by Hujan	"Where the Streets Have No Name" by U2

Both Isma's and Hafiz's second performance were favoured by the judges in comparison to their first performance. Although Yazid was chastised for not delivering his best, he was lauded for his significant improvement throughout the competition.

At the end of the concert, it was announced that there was no elimination and consequently, all the four students would move on to the final concert. In addition, Aril was announced as the student who is recruited into the competition again after winning a massive vote of 52.45% through AFMASUK and he would be joining the final four in the finale.

- Bottom two: Ismaliza Ismail & Mohd Yazid Ibrahim
- Eliminated: None
- Student who is recruited: Khairil Azam Pilus
- Special judge: Ning Baizura

=== Week 10 - Grand finale ===
Original Airdate: 16 May 2009

Akim was noted for his brilliant performance in the previous week, winning him the title of best performer for the second time. Aril had the chance to share his feelings with Siti Hajar about his experience living outside the house since he was eliminated, as well as dealing with negative criticism about him in the internet. Also, the pressure of the competition began to take its toll on Isma, who broke down during the revision of the previous concert. Then, the final song assignment for the students was given, as follows;

Student	Song
Akim	"Bencinta" by Faizal Tahir "Bengang" - Composed by Amir, Lyrics by SQ
Aril	"Kasih Tak Sayang" by Padi "Toksik" - Composed by Alim / Shazee Ishak, Lyrics by Nurfatima
Hafiz	"Kau Bunga Cintaku" by Anuar Zain "Masih Jelas" - Composed by Aidit Alfian, Lyrics by Ad Samad
Isma	"Cinta Adam Dan Hawa" by Misha Omar "Bisikan... Godaan" - Composed and lyrics by Zul
Yazid	"Kasidah cinta" by Dewa 19 "Ya Papa" - Composed by Tun Taja, Lyrics by Hairul Anuar Harun

In their first performance, Hafiz was criticized as he was too distracted by his choreography. Akim's improvement was noted, although the judges felt that he was not giving his very best; Yazid was castigated for not taking charge of his own music style due to his disappointing performance which was deemed as too heavy and unsuitable for his vocal. While Isma's performance was chastised as being forgettable, Aril became the only one who impressed the judges with his stellar performance, earning him the best performer in the first round.

In their second performance, Hafiz redeemed himself with his brilliant performance, although it was noted as fairly predictable. The judges were amazed with Akim's powerful performance as he managed to command the stadium. On the other hand, both Yazid and Isma's performance was lambasted for being too average and mediocre, while Aril's consistent performance won the judges over as he received unanimous praise for his energetic performance.

The concert also featured performances from the semi-finalists as well as from the previously eliminated students throughout the season, and also from the winner of the sixth season, Stacy. At the end of the concert, the voting line was closed and Hafiz was crowned as the seventh winner of Akademi Fantasia

- Fifth: Ismaliza Ismail
- Fourth: Mohd Yazid Ibrahim
- Third: Afiq Hakim Ahmad
- Runner-up: Khairil Azam Pilus
- Winner: Mohd Hafiz Mohd Suip
- Special guests: Hardstyle Republic, Din Beramboi, Lisa Surihani, Adam AF2, Stacy AF6

== Students ==
(ages stated are at time of contest)

Student	Age	Hometown	Rank
Nas Adila Mohd Dan	22	Johor Bahru, Johor	14th
Ahmad Sobri Hasmuni	24	Johor Bahru, Johor	13th
Zuzafrini Zulkifli	24	Kajang, Selangor	12th
Rubisa binti Tiasin	22	Kota Marudu, Sabah	11th
Nur Fazelah @ Zizie Mad Tahil	24	Semporna, Sabah	10th
Mohd Rashidi Mohamad Isa	26	Ipoh, Perak	9th
Mohd Qhauhd Abdul Rashid	25	Cheras, Selangor	8th
Claudia Fay Geres	23	Kuching, Sarawak	7th
Siti Aishah Bujang	18	Kuching, Sarawak	6th
Ismaliza Ismail	30	Kuala Lumpur	5th
Mohd Yazid Ibrahim	22	Johor Bahru, Johor	4th
Afiq Hakim Ahmad	18	Johor Bahru, Johor	3rd
Khairil Azam Pilus	24	Kuala Lumpur	Runner-up
Mohd Hafiz Mohd Suip	19	Kuching, Sarawak	Winner

== Summaries ==
=== Elimination chart ===
Voting Result in Rank Order
Order	Weekly Concerts									
Order	1	2	3	4	5	6	7	8	9	10
1	Hafiz	Hafiz	Isma	Isma	Isma	Hafiz	Hafiz	Yazid	Hafiz	Hafiz
2	Rubisa	Isma	Hafiz	Hafiz	Hafiz	Isma	Isma	Hafiz	Akim	Aril
3	Yazid	Aril	Aishah	Yazid	Yazid	Akim	Aishah	Isma	Yazid	Akim
4	Aril	Aishah	Aril	Qhaud	Akim	Aril	Yazid	Akim	Isma	Yazid
5	Zizi	Akim	Akim	Akim	Aishah	Yazid	Akim	Aishah	Aril	Isma
6	Isma	Zizi	Claudia	Aishah	Claudia	Claudia	Claudia	Claudia		
7	Claudia	Yazid	Zizi	Aril	Aril	Aishah	Aril			
8	Aishah	Rubisa	Qhaud	Claudia	Qhaud	Qhaud				
9	Akim	Claudia	Rubisa	Sidi	Sidi					
10	Obri	Sidi	Sidi	Zizi						
11	Qhaud	Qhaud	Yazid	Rubisa						
12	Rini	Rini	Rini							
13	Adila	Obri	Obri							
14	Sidi	Adila								

The student won the competition
The student was the runner-up
The student was the second runner-up
The students were finalists
The student was the best performer of the week
The student was the best performer but was eliminated
The student was re-entered into the competition through AFMASUK
The student was the original eliminee but was saved
The student(s) was eliminated

- In week 1, there was no elimination. The accumulated votes were forwarded to the following week's performance.
- In Week 2, the Principal deemed which student was the best performer in the previous concert and the student who won that honour would get a privilege to go out from the Akademi House. The first honour went to Hafiz.
- Week 3, 4 and 8 featured a double elimination concert.
- In week 9, there was no elimination. However, Aril was re-entered into the competition after scoring the highest votes through AFMASUK.

== Cast members ==
=== Hosts ===
- AC Mizal - Host of AF Concert
- Sarimah Ibrahim - Host of AF Diary

=== Professional trainers ===
- Datin Seri Tiara Jacquelina - Principal
- Shafizawati Sharif - Vocal Technical
- Siti Hajar Ismail - Vocal Presentation
- Genervie Kam - Music & Vocal
- A. Aris Kadir - Choreographer
- Fatimah Abu Bakar - English Language & Motivator
- Ida Nerina - Drama & Acting
- Hashridz Murshim - Music Director

=== Judges ===
- Edry Hashim
- Dato' Khadijah Ibrahim
- Adlin Aman Ramlie

== Season statistics ==
- Total number of students: 14
- Oldest student: Ismaliza Ismail, 30 years old
- Youngest students: Afiq Hakim Ahmad & Siti Aishah Bujang, both 18 years old
- Tallest student: Mohd Rashidi Mohamad Isa, 6'0.4" (184 cm)
- Shortest student: Siti Aishah Bujang, 4'8" (146 cm)
- Heaviest student: Mohd Rashidi Mohamad Isa, 176 lbs (80 kg)
- Lightest student: Siti Aishah Bujang, 88 lb (40 kg)
- Student with the most collective highest votes: Mohd Hafiz Suip, 6 times
- Student with the most consecutive highest votes: Ismaliza Ismail, 3 times
- Students with the most collective best performance: Afiq Hakim Ahmad, Mohd Hafiz Suip, & Mohd Qhauhd Abdul Rashid, all 2 times
- Top 3's vote mean (excluding finale): Mohd Hafiz Suip – 1.44, Khairil Azam Pilus - 5.14, Afiq Hakim Ahmad - 4.67,
- Top 3's vote median (excluding finale): Mohd Hafiz Suip – 1, Khairil Azam Pilus - 4, Afiq Hakim Ahmad - 5
- Students with the most collective bottom two appearances: Ahmad Sobri Hasmuni, Claudia Fay Geres, Mohd Qhauhd Abdul Rashid, Mohd Rashidi Mohamad Isa, Nas Adila Mohd Dan, & Siti Aishah Bujang, all 2 times
- Students with the most consecutive bottom two appearances: Ahmad Sobri Hasmuni, Claudia Fay Geres, Mohd Qhauhd Abdul Rashid, & Nas Adila Mohd Dan, all 2 times
- Students with no bottom two appearance: Afiq Hakim Ahmad & Mohd Hafiz Suip
