= Siti Nurhaliza filmography =

Filmography

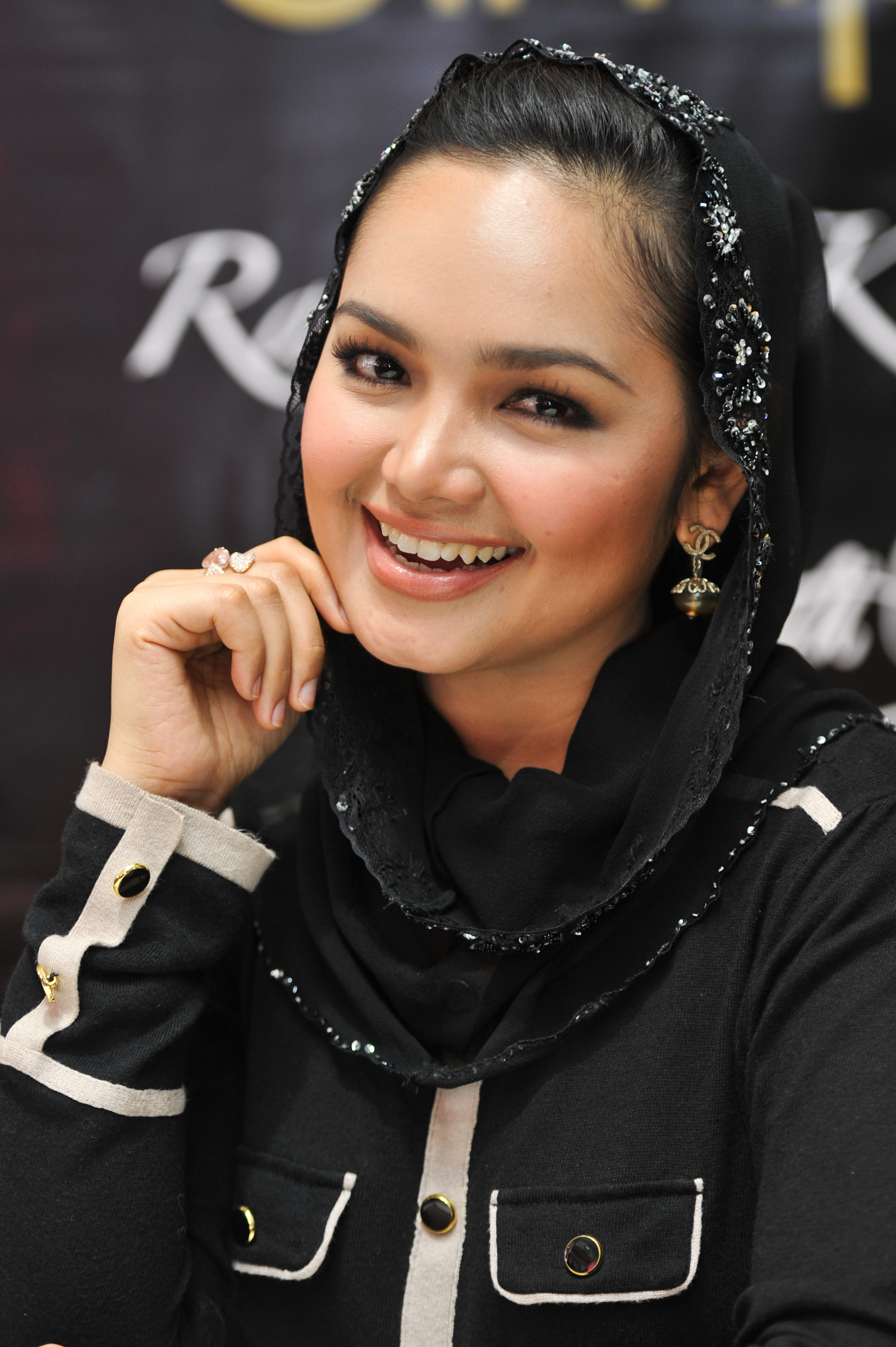
Siti Nurhaliza in 2011

This is a list of television shows that Siti Nurhaliza has been involved in. She has been featured in more than 70 television shows, some of which are produced by her own production company, Siti Nurhaliza Productions. She has also starred in a number of musical television shows that have been produced throughout the Asean region, especially in Malaysia, Singapore and Indonesia.

In 2009, she was honoured by Astro to have her own channel, SITI for two days showing mostly of her previous concerts and music videos. In 2011, on her 33rd birthday, a documentary about her life, Siti Nurhaliza premiered on the History Channel with interviews by her and from people who have worked with her about her journey in the Malaysian entertainment industry.

== Channel ==
Year	Appearance	Role	Notes
2009	SITI (Channel 188)	Herself	A special channel for two days for her by Astro showing her previous concerts – Konsert Fantasia Siti Nurhaliza (2004), Konsert SATU (2009) and various music video clips from her. She was the first ever to receive such recognition from Astro.

== Online ==
Year	Title	Role	Notes
2009	Konsert Seribu Warna	Herself	One of her first concerts to be made available for live online streaming where with only RM 15 (RM 10 for early birds), fans can buy online ticket to access the streaming channel of the said concert.
2018	#ArtisMasukBilique: Dato' Seri Siti Nurhaliza	Herself/Guest	DBilique is a digital live broadcast channel in Malaysia, hosted by Faizal Ismail and Fara Fauzana. Siti was one of the guests in the program.

== Television ==
Year	Appearance	Role	Notes
1995	Bintang RTM	Herself – Winner	Her first ever television program where she auditioned before later was crowned as the overall winner.
1998	Hiburan Minggu Ini	Herself	
1998	Sensasi bersama Siti Nurhaliza	Herself	A special television program for Eid-ul-Fitr.
1999	Konsert Pancawarna Siti Nurhaliza	Herself	A special television program for Eid-ul-Fitr.
2000	Bersama Siti Nurhaliza	Herself	A special 15-episode television program for Television Corporation of Singapore.
2000	Hiburan Minggu Ini	Herself	
2001	Divas of South East Asia	Herself	She joined with fellow Malaysian artistes, Sheila Majid, Fauziah Latiff, with another three Indonesian representatives, Krisdayanti, Titi DJ and Vina Panduwninata with single representative from Philippines, Kuh Ledesma for a concert that was aired throughout the Asean region.
2001	Asia Music Festival	Herself	She was among the select few Malaysian artists who were chosen to represent Malaysian music industry to Japan. Hosted by Malaysian and Japanese comperes, Maya Karin and Marc Panther, the show was broadcast on both Malaysian and Japanese television channels, TV2 and NHK respectively.
2002	Hiburan Minggu Ini	Herself	
2002	Ole-ole Siti Nurhaliza	Herself	A special television program for Eid-ul-Fitr.
2002	1 Jam Bersama Siti Nurhaliza	Herself	A special 60-minute television program for her by an Indonesian television channel, Indosiar.
2003	Dari Studio Satu Bersama Siti Nurhaliza	Herself	
2003	Japan and ASEAN Pop Stars Dream Concert	Herself	She was the only Malaysian representative to the 2003 Japan and ASEAN Pop Stars (J-ASEAN POPs) Dream Concert in Yokohama, Japan, where she sang the Malay version of the originally Japanese theme song of the event.
2003	Manajemen Qolbu	Herself	She was one of the guests for an Indonesian Islamic television program which was aired on Trans TV.
2003	Konsert Menjunjung Kasih Siti Nurhaliza	Herself	A special concert in conjunction with the coronation of Sultan of Selangor, Sultan Sharafuddin Idris Shah Al-Haj that was aired on Eid-ul-Fitr of 2003.
2003	Hiburan Minggu Ini (HMI) Aidilfitri Bersama Siti Nurhaliza	Herself	A special television program for Eid-ul-Fitr.
2003	Sejenak Bersama Siti Nurhaliza	Herself	A special one-hour show for Indonesian television station, antv.
2003	Siti Nurhaliza Special	Herself	A special television program for an Indonesia television station, Trans TV.
2003	Konser Azimat Cinta	Herself	A special television program for an Indonesia television station, Trans TV.
2003	Dear Siti	Herself	A special television program for an Indonesia television station, Indosiar.
2003	Idul Fitri/Lebaran Bersama Siti Nurhaliza	Herself	A special television program for Eid-ul-Fitr for an Indonesia television station, Indosiar.
2003	Akademi Fantasia 1	Herself/Guest Judge	A reality television show in which a number of contestants compete for the coveted title as the overall winner and a chance to start their career in the entertainment industry. She was a guest judge for the Week 5 concert.
2004	Muzikal Aidiladha	Herself	One of several of her earliest television shows that were produced by her own company, Siti Nurhaliza Productions (M) Sdn. Bhd.
2004	3D Siti (Dari Dalam Diri Siti)	Herself/host	A 13-episode reality television show that reveals the private life and behind the scenes of being Siti Nurhaliza.
2004	Siti Nurhaliza – Mutiara Negeri Jiran	Herself	A two-episode show with television station, Trans TV.
2004	Sang Idola Siti Nurhaliza	Herself	A special television program for an Indonesia television station, Indosiar.
2004	Siti Nurhaliza Special	Herself	A special television program for an Indonesia television station, RCTI.
2004	Eksklusif Melanesia Siti Nurhaliza	Herself	A special television program for an Indonesia television station, Trans TV.
2004	Syawal Datang Lagi	Herself	Her own productions with collaboration with RTM for Eid-ul-Fitr.
2004	Variasi Fitri... Siti Nurhaliza	Herself	Her own productions with collaboration with TV3 for Eid-ul-Fitr.
2004	Aidilfitriku Bersama Siti Nurhaliza	Herself	Her own productions with collaboration with Astro for Eid-ul-Fitr. This show received an award for Best Special Musical Television Programme from Anugerah Seri Angkasa in 2005.
2004	Malaysian Idol 1	Herself/Guest Judge	Malaysian Idol is the Malaysian version of the Idol Series that started in UK, similar to shows such as UK's Pop Idol and American Idol in the franchise. This show was broadcast to Malaysian viewers via 8TV and TV3.
2005	Konsert Akustik Siti Nurhaliza	Herself	The show was also released as VCD and it was nominated for Best Entertainment Special in Asian Television Awards 2005 where it received Highly Commended Honours.
2005	Mentor	Herself	A reality program where she becomes the mentor for Mohd. Fahmi Hj. Jaafar (Fahmi) where she and her protégé were competing with different artistes and their protégés.
2005	Konsert Fenomena Siti Nurhaliza & Dayang Nurfaizah	Herself	A special television program for Eid-ul-Fitr with Dayang Nurfaizah.
2005	Siti Nurhaliza – Indonesian Tour	Herself	A two-episode show for Trans TV, showing her performances of touring five main cities of Indonesia.
2005	Nazam Lebaran Bersama Siti Nurhaliza	Herself	A special television program for Eid-ul-Fitr.
2006	Antara KL & Jakarta	Herself	A special two-episode television program, where the first episode featured two female artistes from Malaysia, and another one from Indonesia before the next episode where it featured the male artistes. She collaborated with Sheila Majid and Shanty from Indonesia.
2006	Dari Studio Satu Bersama Siti Nurhaliza	Herself	
2006	Zoom In Bersama Siti Nurhaliza	Herself	
2006	Zaleha Ayam Patah	Cameo as an early 1950s Ghazal singer.	A special production of Universiti Putra Malaysia.
2006	Tiada Rahsia	Herself	Special show discussing personal matters of Siti Nurhaliza and her husband, Datuk Seri Khalid before they were married in a special 3 episodes.
2006	The Million Makers	Herself	She was featured in the first episode of the second season of The Million Makers, a production by Channel NewsAsia that detailed on successful figures who managed to accumulate wealth and become a millionaire before they reach the age of 35.
2006	Siaran Langsung Perkahwinan Siti Nurhaliza & Datuk K	Herself	A live telecast of Siti's engagement on 21 August and wedding on 28 August where it was watched more than 6.3 million viewers.
2006	Eksklusif Siti Nurhaliza	Herself	A special concert in conjunction with the release of her eleventh solo album, Transkripsi in Indonesia.
2006	Konsert Fenomena Siti Nurhaliza & Saiful Apek	Herself	A special Eid-ul-Fitr television program with Saiful Apek.
2006	Konsert Idul Fitri Siti Nurhaliza	Herself	A special Eid-ul-Fitr television program for an Indonesian television channel, Trans TV.
2006	Mentor	Herself	Second season of Mentor where she taught her protégé, Siti Khadijah Hassan (Kat) where they end up winning the second runner up overall.
2006	Siti Nurhaliza Mencari Bintang Pantene	Herself/Judge	A reality television program with the collaboration with Pantene to find the next ambassador for Pantene in the Malaysian market where she is both judge and host.
2006	Rendezvouz with Siti Nurhaliza & Erwin Gutawa	Herself	A special television programme aired by Indosiar, the making of her concert in Royal Albert Hall with the Indonesian maestro, Erwin Gutawa.
2006	Akademi Fantasia 4	Herself/Guest Judge	A reality television show in which a number of contestants compete for the coveted title as the overall winner and a chance to start their career in the entertainment industry. She was a guest judge for the Week 7 concert.
2007	Detik Kehidupan Siti Nurhaliza	Herself	
2007	Olay - Cintai Kulit Indahmu	Herself	A special television program which was aired on Trans TV during her period as Olay's ambassadress for both Malaysian and Indonesian market.
2007	Bicara - Siti Nurhaliza	Herself	She was a guest artist in a Singaporean talk show which was broadcast on MediaCorp Suria.
2007	Siti Nurhaliza Cari Bintang Pantene	Herself/Judge	An Indonesian version of Malaysia's Siti Nurhaliza Mencari Bintang Pantene.
2007	MyStarz LG	Herself/Judge	A reality singing competition program with the collaboration with LG Electronics to search the best singer where she was one of the main judges.
2007	Akademi Fantasia 5	Herself/Guest Judge	A reality television show in which a number of contestants compete for the coveted title as the overall winner and a chance to start their career in the entertainment industry. She was a guest judge for the Week 9 concert.
2008	Zoom In Bersama Siti Nurhaliza	Herself	
2008	Teratak Siti Nurhaliza	Herself	A one-hour special television program where she and her sisters, Siti Saerah and Siti Norsaida performed an Eid-ul-Fitr special.
2008	Siti Nurhaliza Cari Bintang Pantene	Herself/Judge	Second season of an Indonesian version of Malaysia's Siti Nurhaliza Mencari Bintang Pantene.
2008	Siti Nurhaliza Bersama Peminat	Herself	A special television program for Eid-ul-Fitr.
2009	Kasih Siti	Herself	A special television program for Eid-ul-Fitr.
2009	Spa Q 2	Special Appearance	
2009	Citarasa Bersama Dato' Siti Nurhaliza	Herself/host	A 13-episode cooking show for Ramadhan where she hosted with several guest artists.
2009	Lentera Aidilfitri Dato' Siti	Herself	A special television program for Eid-ul-Fitr.
2009	Konsert Sesuci Lebaran Datuk Siti Nurhaliza	Herself	A special television program for Eid-ul-Fitr.
2009	Akademi Fantasia 7	Herself/Guest Judge	A reality television show in which a number of contestants compete for the coveted title as the overall winner and a chance to start their career in the entertainment industry. She was a guest judge alongside Amy Search for the Week 4 concert, which was also a tribute to both of them.
2010	Konsert Bagaikan Sakti Siti Nurhaliza & M. Nasir	Herself	A live telecast of Siti's and M. Nasir's collaboration concert in Singapore.
2010	Stylistika Siti	Herself	A special one-hour show where she performed while donning her favourite stylists' dresses and discussed mostly sartorially matter from her early beginnings.
2010	Konsert Di Hati Siti	Herself	Her first show with TV9 and also her first show where she invited her idols to perform together.
2010	CT15	Herself	A special television program for Eid-ul-Fitr.
2010	Lebaran Diva Dato' Siti Nurhaliza	Herself	
2010	Idola Kecil 3	Herself/Guest Judge	A tribute to her where she also was a guest judge.
2011	SITI	Herself/host	Her first talk show, a 13-episode programme with four different segments – V.I.P. Siti, Sentuhan Kasih (Love Touch), Siti’s Perspective and Siti’s Symphony starting on 12 February.
2011	My Celeb MTV	Herself/host	She was featured in a television programme by MTV Asia for airing mainly in the Asian and the Asean regions.
2011	Vokal Bukan Sekadar Rupa	Herself/Guest Judge	TV3's reality show looking for natural vocal talent and not based on appearance.
2011	Datuk Siti Nurhaliza bersama Idola Kecil 3	Herself	A special television program for Eid-ul-Fitr where she celebrated Eid-ul-Fitr with contestants of Idola Kecil 3.
2011	Konsert Aura 3 Diva	Herself	A special television program for Eid-ul-Fitr where she shared the stage with Ella and Ramlah Ram.
2011	Gegar Raya Kampung Pening Lalat	Herself	A special game show for Eid-ul-Fitr where she hosted with Saiful Apek and comedian group, Sepah.
2011	Maharaja Lawak Mega	Herself/Judge	She serves as one of the main judges in the search of the best comedians from Malaysia, Singapore and Indonesia.
2011	Akademi Fantasia 9	Herself/Guest Judge	A reality television show in which a number of contestants compete for the coveted title as the overall winner and a chance to start their career in the entertainment industry. She was the guest judge for the Week 9 concert.
2012	Siti Nurhaliza	Herself	A documentary on her journey and the hardships that she has to face and her continuous efforts in becoming an artiste which was aired on History Channel on 11 January 2012 to coincide with her 33rd birthday. The documentary was even nominated for 2012 Asian Television Awards in the category of Best Music Programme.
2012	Podium	Herself	It's a show where it featured Siti Nurhaliza's journey with her cosmetic company campaign and tour, Simplysiti Di Hati tour which was broadcast on RTM2.
2012	MasterChef Selebriti Malaysia 1	Herself/Guest Judge	In the Malaysian celebrity version of the original MasterChef, she was a guest judge for the 21st episode - "Menang Berganda, Sekali Lagi" (Multiple Winnings Once More).
2013	Siti Ooo...Som	Herself/host	A 13-episode game show where she co-hosted with Nabil Ahmad and Sharifah Shahira. The game show is basically divided into six main segments – Sepantas Kilat, Riuh Rendah, Siapa Hebat, Kebaboom, Siti Cabar and Huru Hara.
2013	Versus 2	Herself/Guest Judge	A reality show with the concept of Battle of the Bands, where she was one of the guest judges for the Week 5 concert.
2013	Versus 2	Herself	The theme for Week 6 (Fifth concert) was "Queen Siti", a tribute to her where she was featured in every clip before the songs that have been chosen to be performed by the contestants.
2013	Stailista Unplugged	Herself	A special television program for Eid-ul-Fitr where she shared the stage with Shila Amzah, Najwa Latif and Alyah.
2013	Konsert Sanggar Lebaran – Dato’ Siti Nurhaliza	Herself	A special television program for Eid-ul-Fitr.
2013	Hot TV Raya bersama Siti Nurhaliza	Herself	A special television program for Eid-ul-Fitr in collaboration with Hot FM.
2013	Akademi Fantasia 10/2013	Herself	For the 10th instalment of Akademi Fantasia, she was chosen as one of the 'Inspirers' whose job is to teach, motivate and share her experiences as singers with the students alongside Melly Goeslaw and Faizal Tahir.
2013	Asean-Japan Music Festival - Music for Healing after the Earthquake	Herself	She was invited by the Japanese embassy in Malaysia to represent Malaysia at the Asean-Japan Music Festival, which was held in commemoration of the 40th anniversary of Japan - Asean countries relationship, and as a musical appeal for relief aids for victims of 2011 Tōhoku earthquake and tsunami During the festival, she performed a medley of songs that she personally had chosen - Biarlah Rahsia, Koibito yo (a Japanese song, made famous by Mayumi Itsuwa) and Nirmala in front of other representatives from both Japan and Asean countries and also the Japanese Prime Minister, Shinzō Abe who officiated the festival. Apart from local Japanese viewing, the festival was also made available for viewing for worldwide audience through NHK World.
2013	Gala TV: Istimewa Bersama Siti Nurhaliza	Herself	A special show that discussed her 18th years' journey in the music industry for Forumuzik. The interview was done by one of Astro Awani's editors, Syazwan Zakariah in a special two episodes.
2014	Akustika Ramadan	Herself/Guest Artist	A special television program for Ramadan where she was a guest artist.
2014	Akustika Syawal	Herself/Guest Artist	A special television program for Eid-ul-Fitr where she was a guest artist and shared the stage with Bochey.
2014	Karoot Komedia X Raya	Special Appearance/Adik	A special television program for Eid-ul-Fitr where she act as a younger sister to two popular comedians and shared the stage with Sabri Yunus, Ebby Yus, Jep, Yus, Zizan and Rahim.
2014	Konsert Superstar	Herself	A special television program at an Indonesian television RCTI, where she shared the stage with Indonesian singers Ayu Ting Ting and Syahrini.
2014	Ada Ada Aja	Herself/Guest Artist	She was the guests for an Indonesian Entertainment television program which was aired on Global TV.
2014	Dahsyat – Istimewa Bersama Siti Nurhaliza	Herself/Guest Artist	She was one of the guests for an Indonesian Entertainment television program which was aired on RCTI.
2014	Sarah Sechan	Herself/Guest Artist	She was the guests for an Indonesian Entertainment television program which was aired on NET TV.
2014	Apa Saja FBI	Herself/Guest Artist	She was the guests for Malaysian Entertainment television program which was aired on TV 9.
2014	Buliten Awani	Herself/Guest Anchor	She became an anchor at the Astro AWANI: Buletin Tengahari with one of the Astro Awani's producers, Rizal Zulkapli.
2014	Agenda Awani: AIM 21: Pengiktirafan & Realiti Industri Muzik	Herself/Special Guest	A special show that discussed the 21 years journey of the Anugerah Industri Muzik (Music Industry Awards). She was the guests with RIM Executive Chief Officer, Ramani Ramalingam. The interview was done by one of Astro Awani's host, Shafizan Johari.
2015	Fragmen Hidup Siti Nurhaliza	Herself/Guest Artist	A special episode in conjunction with first anniversary of Women's Weekly Feminine with other guests.
2015	Majlis: Sitizone BackToSchool	Herself	Majlis is a TV program reveal festive event. In this episode featuring celebration of Siti Nurhaliza fan club (SitiZone) anniversary with a special theme 'back to school' and broadcast on Astro Ria and Astro Maya HD.
2015	The 5 Show	Herself/Guest Artist	She was the guests for Singaporean Entertainment television program which was aired on MediaCorp Channel 5.
2015	Lebih Indah bersama Dato' Siti Nurhaliza	Herself	A special television program for Eid-ul-Fitr which was aired on TV 1 with her guest artists Akim 'The Majistret' and Tegar from Indonesia.
2015	Romantika Raya	Herself	A special television program for Eid-ul-Fitr which was aired on Astro Ria where she shared the stories and details of her marriage and life while touring Turkey with her husband.
2015	D'Academy Asia	Herself/Commentator	Dangdut Academy Asia (D'Academy Asia) is a Nusantara-wide dangdut competition featuring contestants from Indonesia, Malaysia, Singapore and Brunei. It was broadcast on Indosiar, where she was a guest commentator for 2 days for the top 8 for group A.
2016	Ceria All Star	Herself/Guest Judge	A reality talent show for kids, where she was the guest judge for the final concert. The program was aired on Astro Ceria.
2016	KONSER RAYA 21 (Indosiar Untuk Indonesia)	Herself/Special Appearance	A special concert in conjunction with 21st anniversary of Indosiar, an Indonesia television station. She was the special appearance at the concert and she performed a duet song with Indonesian artist Iyeth Bustami called Laksamana Raja Dilaut and solo performance for Nirmala, Terbaik Bagimu and Bukan Cinta Biasa. Where the show was broadcast on Indosiar.
2016	Akademi Silat Pendekar Muda	Herself/Guest Judge	A reality show for Malay traditional martial art, Silat. Where she was the guest judge for the episodes 2 and 3. The program was broadcast on TV Alhijrah.
2016	Ceria Popstar	Herself/Judge	A reality talent show for kids, where she serves as one of the main judges with Malaysia's rock legend Awie. The program was aired on Astro Ceria and Astro MayaHD.
2016	Kisah disebalik lagu : Cindai	Herself/Special Guest	A special show that discussed about her popular song Cindai. She was one of the guests with the composer and lyricist of the song. The program was aired on TV 9.
2016	Projek Ceria Dato’ Siti Nurhaliza	Herself/Special Guest	Projek Ceria is a community and charity based program that will realize the dreams of children and adolescents with cancer to meet their favorite celebrities. This program was aired on Astro Ceria.
2016	Labbaikallah	Herself/Special Guest	Labbaikallah is a talk show and news program in conjunction with Haj. She was invited for discussing ‘Toward a Tashriq’ and focusing with her experience performing Haj. This program was host by Ustaz Don Daniyal and live broadcast at TV Alhijrah.
2016	Super Spontan Superstar	Herself/Special Guest	She was invited as guest artiste at game show at week 7. This game show was broadcast at Astro Warna and Mustika HD.
2016	h!live Eksklusif with Dato' Siti NurHaliza	Herself/Guest	She was feature in h!live Eksklusif with Dato' Siti NurHaliza, she were shared a story behind the scene of her Siti & Friends Concert and talk about her new music video "Memories," a single duet with Whitney Houston.
2016	D'Academy Asia 2	Herself/Commentator	Dangdut Academy Asia 2 (D'Academy Asia) is a second season of Nusantara-wide dangdut competition featuring contestants from Indonesia, Malaysia, Singapore, Brunei, Thailand and Timor Leste. It was broadcast on Indosiar, where she was a guest commentator for 2 days for the Final episodes.
2017	KONSER RAYA 22 (Semesta Cinta Indonesia)	Herself/Special Appearance	A special concert in conjunction with 22nd anniversary of Indosiar, an Indonesia television station. She was the special appearance at the concert and she performed Betapa Kucinta Padamu and Percayalah. Where the show was broadcast on Indosiar.
2017	Konser Golden Memories International - Special Siti Nurhaliza	Herself	A special television program for an Indonesia television station, Indosiar.
2017	Sepahtu Reunion Live (Final)	Cameo/Chombi	Stage comedy program, Sepahtu Reunion Live was aired on Astro Warna. She was a special guest along with Jamal Abdillah, Fauziah Latiff, Ilya and more. She was act as Chombi from Ibu Mentuaku film that direct by Tan Sri P Ramlee.
2017	Gema Gegar Vaganza	Herself/Guest Judge	Gema Gegar Vaganza is a spiritual singing competition program and it is broadcast on Astro Oasis and Astro Maya HD. She was a guest judge for final concert.
2017	Inspirasi Takwa Dato' Siti Nurhaliza	Herself/host	A 4-episodes talk show that share and discuss about life's journey of woman who inspires the community, which was broadcast on Astro Oasis.
2017	CTDK-ation	Herself	Her own reality show with her husband Datuk Seri Khalid Mohamad Jiwa. This 10-episode reality series were focus on the couple's overseas travel to places like Spain, Portugal and Dubai, United Arab Emirates, which was aired on Astro Ria and Astro Ria HD on 29 December 2017.
2018	It's Alif!	Herself/Special Guest	A talk show program host by singer actor Alif Satar and the program was broadcast on ntv7.
2018	Big Stage	Herself/Judge	A reality talent show for new talents or Budak Baru Nak Up (BBNU), where she serves as one of the main judges with Faizal Tahir. The program was aired on Astro Ria and Astro RiaHD.
2018	A Bit With Ebit!	Herself/Special Guest	An interactive talk show that discus about family issues based on the Sunnah of Muhammad. The program was broadcast on TV Alhijrah.
2018	2nd ASEAN-Japan Music Festival	Herself	The 2nd ASEAN-Japan Music Festival as Celebration of the 45th Year of ASEAN-Japan Friendship and Cooperation. The festival was held in Tokyo's NHK Hall and aired through NHK Channel. This festival were joined by various Asian artists from Japan and 10 Southeast Asian countries.
2019	Komuniti AWANI	Herself/Guest Anchor	She became an anchor for 3 episodes at the Komuniti AWANI segment at channel 501 Astro AWANI.
2019	Bintang Minggu Ini - Raya DCT	Herself	A special television program for Eid-ul-Fitr which was aired on Astro Ria and Astro Ria HD with her guest artist Syafiq Farhain. The program were host by Nabil dan Sherry Al Hadad.
2019	Big Stage	Herself/Judge	A reality talent show for new talents or Budak Baru Nak Up (BBNU), where she serves as one of the main judges with Indonesian singers Chakra Khan and Judika. The program was aired on Astro Ria and Astro RiaHD.
2020	MeleTOP	Herself/Guest Host	She became as guest host at MeleTOP, a live talk show program that aired on Astro Ria and Astro RiaHD.
2022	Master in the House Malaysia	Herself/Master	
2022	Big Stage	Herself/Judge	
2022	Terpaling Juara	Herself/Guest Judge	
2022	Sepahtu Reunion Live	Juwita (Episode "Hati Juwita"	
2024	The Hardest Singing Show	Herself/Guest Judge	

== Theatre ==
Year	Title	Role	Notes
2004	Gema Zafana - Sebuah Persembahan Zapin Johor	Herself	Main character
2007	P. Ramlee The Musical	Azizah	Special appearance
2009	Sirah Junjungan Tahajjud Cinta	Herself	Special appearance
2015	Sirah Rasulullah Tahajjud Cinta	Herself	Special appearance
2016	Mahaguru Spontan (Game Show)	Herself/Mahaguru Datuk Siti	Main character

== Film ==
Year	Title	Role	Notes	Box office
2002	Zaleha Ayam Patah	Herself	Short film, special appearance	
2009	Kelip-Kelip	Kunang-Kunang (voice)	Main Character	
2018	Konsert Hora Horey Didi & Friends	Mak Iti (voice)	Special Appearance	RM 2.75 Million (US$656951)
2021	Siti: Are You Ready?	Herself	Main Character	

== Radio ==
Year	Title	Role	Notes
2017	Dato' Siti Nurhaliza Take Over	Herself/Radio DJ	In conjunction with her birthday, she make a special appearance as a radio DJ for 2 hours on air program Dato Siti Nurhaliza Take Over at Hot.fm.
2019	CT FM	Herself/Radio DJ	On 1 March 2019, Hot FM Radio changed its name from Hot FM to CT FM in conjunction with Siti Nurhaliza Concert On Tour for one day with a motto "lebih ct daripada biasa".
2019	Aku Cinta Padamu	Herself/Cameo	Aku Cinta Padamu is a 15 episodes Radio Drama that was aired on Kool.fm in the segment Dramatik Kool. Siti Nurhaliza as a cameo that unite Cempaka and Aaron through her song Aku Cinta Padamu. Also starring by Wany Hasrita as Cempaka and Izzue Islam as Aaron Iskandar.
