= Akademi Fantasia season 3 =

Akademi Fantasia
- Season 3
- Hosted by: Aznil Nawawi
- Judges: Kudsia Kahar
- Winner: Asmawi Ani
- Runner-up: Felix Agus
- Finals venue: Putra Indoor Stadium

Release
- Original network: Astro Ria
- Original release: 4 June – 7 August 2005

Season chronology
- ← Previous; Season 2 Next → Season 4

The third season of Akademi Fantasia premiered on the Astro Ria television channel on 4 June 2005. Kudsia Kahar continued to judge the show's contestants, along with Aznil Nawawi as host. Asmawi Ani, a native of FELDA Taib Andak, Kulai, Johor, was announced the winner of the competition on 7 August 2005, defeating runner-up Felix Agus.

As much as 20 contestants were selected before the final 12 contestants were chosen in the prelude concert. However, in this season's first concert, those eight contestants who were eliminated in the prelude concert were given a chance to compete in the first concert in order to be recruited into the competition againas the thirteenth and the fourteenth contestants. This season also continued the format of not eliminating any contestant in the first concert.

As much as 10.7 million votes were cast throughout this entire season.

== Semi-final ==
A prelude concert was held on 21 May 2005 to determine the 12 finalists who would move on into the main competition. Each semi-finalist was given the liberty to choose their own song.

Females

Contestant	Song	Result
Akma	"I Will Always Love You" (Whitney Houston)	Advanced
Amy	"Saving All My Love for You" (Whitney Houston)	Advanced
Amylea	"If I Ain't Got You" (Alicia Keys)	Advanced
Diana	"Aku Sayang Padamu" (Atiek CB)	Eliminated
Ekin	"Dialah Di Hati" (Siti Nurhaliza)	Advanced
Elliza	"Mengapa" (Nicky Astria)	Advanced
Idayu	"I Have Nothing" (Whitney Houston)	Advanced
Marsha	"Colors of the Wind" (Vanessa Williams)	Disqualified
Rina	"Mama Ku Ingin Pulang" (Nike Ardilla)	Eliminated
Shiha	"I'm Gonna Getcha Good!" (Shania Twain)	Eliminated

Males

Contestant	Song	Result
Aidil	"Kau Lupa Janji" (Jamal Abdillah)	Advanced
Azlif	"Isabella" (Search)	Eliminated
Felix	"Cinta Seorang Teman" (Bob AF2)	Advanced
Fuad	"She's a Lady" (Tom Jones)	Advanced
Haider	"It's My Life" (Bon Jovi)	Eliminated
Isa	"Aku Cinta Padamu" (Hazami)	Eliminated
Kefli	"Dir" (Rahim Maarof)	Advanced
Mawi	"Intifada" (Rabbani)	Eliminated
Reza	"Ku Harap Cinta" (Nowseeheart)	Advanced
Yazer	"Rela Ku Pujuk" (Spider)	Advanced

During the Prelude concert, Marsha failed to perform as she was diagnosed with sore throat. Panel of jury was in consensus that her failure to participate in the concert engendered her to be automatically disqualified. Nevertheless, she was called forward on stage and was given a chance to sing the first verse of her song with no music. Below is the list of semi-finalists who did not make it to the Top 12.

- Asmawi Ani, 23, Kulai, Johor
- Azlif Suhaizad Abdullah, 23, Johor Bahru, Johor
- Haider Arif, 20, Kota Kinabalu, Sabah
- Hazrina binti Illias, 21, Sri Manjung, Perak
- Isa Kumar Jali Sulaiman, 19, Kota Samarahan, Sarawak
- Marsha Milan Londoh, 20, Tamparuli, Sabah
- Nor Diana Akmar Tajul Ariffin, 22, Kuala Lumpur
- Nurshiha Mohd Zikir, 18, Gombak, Selangor

== Concert summaries ==
=== Week 1 ===
Original Airdate: 4 June 2005

Student	Song	Result
Aidil	"Semua Orang Tahu" (Rem)	Saved
Akma	"Nazam Berkasih" (Syura)	Bottom 3
Amy	"Fallin'" (Alicia Keys)	Safe
Amylea	"Inikah Cinta" (Sheila Majid)	Safe
Ekin	"Erti Cinta" (Maya Karin)	Safe
Elliza	"Elegi Sepi" (Azharina)	Bottom 3
Felix	"Tiada Lagi Kidungmu" (Lefthanded)	Safe
Fuad	"Pop Ye Ye" (V.E.)	Safe
Idayu	"Percayalah" (Siti Nurhaliza)	Safe
Kefli	"Nur Kasih" (Slam)	Safe
Reza	"Roman Picisan" (Dewa)	Safe
Yazer	"Ready for Love" (Bad Company)	Safe

Note: There was no elimination in this concert. All the semi-finalists were given another chance to perform in order to be re-entered into the competition. At the end of the concert, Marsha and Mawi were re-entered into the competition through 'AFSERAP' (Faculty's choice).

- Guest judges: Abdul Razak Mohaideen & Aishah

=== Week 2 ===
Original Airdate: 11 June 2005

Student	Song	Result
Aidil no.1	"I Don't Want to Miss a Thing" (Aerosmith)	Bottom 3
Akma no.2	"Cahaya" (Krisdayanti)	Safe
Amy no.3	"Sesalanku" (Ezlynn)	Safe
Amylea no.4	"Asmara" (Anneke Grönloh)	Safe
Ekin no.5	"Joget Sayang Disayang" (Anita Sarawak)	Safe
Elliza no.6	"Aku Dia Dan Kamu" (D-Va)	Eliminated
Felix no.7	"Berjuta Batu" (Alleycats)	Safe
Fuad no.8	"Puteri" (Zainal Abidin)	Bottom 3
Idayu no.9	"Superstar" (Jamelia)	Safe
Kefli no.10	"Mungkin" (Anuar Zain)	Safe
Marsha no.11	"Ingin Bersamamu" (Syafinaz)	Safe
Mawi no.12	"Dari Kekasih Kepada Kekasih" (Hattan)	Safe
Reza no.13	"Terhangat Di Pasaran" (KRU & Adam)	Safe
Yazer no.14	"Sejati" (Wings)	Safe

- Guest judges: Adlin Aman Ramlie & Hattan

=== Week 3 ===
Original Airdate: 18 June 2005

Student	Song	Result
Aidil no.1	"Nak Dara Rindu" (P. Ramlee)	Safe
Akma no.2	"Lagu Rindu" (Siti Nurhaliza)	Safe
Amy no.3	"Asmaradana" (Tiara Jacquelina)	Bottom 3
Amylea no.4	"Anggapan Mu" (Ziana Zain)	Safe
Ekin no.5	"Mimpi Sedih" (Emillia Contessa)	Safe
Felix no.7	"Memori Bahagia" (Sahri AF1)	Safe
Fuad no.8	"Gerimis Di Lautan" (Sudirman)	Eliminated
Idayu no.9	"Curiga" (Ning Baizura)	Bottom 3
Kefli no.10	"Keindahan Pantai" (Zurah 11)	Safe
Marsha no.11	"Lelaki Idaman" (Melly Goeslaw)	Safe
Mawi no.12	"Gadis Melayu" (Othman Hamzah)	Safe
Reza no.13	"Mungkin Nanti" (Peterpan)	Safe
Yazer no.14	"Suatu Masa" (M. Nasir)	Safe

- Guest judges: Afdlin Shauki & Shahruddin (Dean)

=== Week 4 ===
Original Airdate: 25 June 2005

Student	Song	Result
Aidil no.1	"Suratan Atau Kebetulan" (Kenny, Remy, Martin)	Bottom 3
Akma no.2	"L-O-V-E" (Nat King Cole)	Safe
Amy no.3	"Bilang Saja" (Agnes Monica)	Safe
Amylea no.4	"Don't Know Why" (Norah Jones)	Safe
Ekin no.5	"Antara Dua" (Farah AF2)	Safe
Felix no.7	"Aku Semut Merah" (The Meggyz)	Safe
Idayu no.9	"Tiada Lagi Tangisan" (Aishah)	Eliminated
Kefli no.10	"Seksa" (Ukays)	Safe
Marsha no.11	"Tunggu Sekejap" (Jaclyn Victor)	Safe
Mawi no.12	"Nour El Ain" (Amr Diab)	Safe
Reza no.13	"Senandung Semalam" (Jamal Abdillah)	Bottom 3
Yazer no.14	"Nyanyian Serambi" (Ramli Sarip)	Safe

- Guest judges: Fauzi Marzuki & Syafinaz Selamat

=== Week 5 ===
Original Airdate: 2 July 2005

Student	Song	Result
Aidil no.1	"Senyuman Ragamu" (Gerhana Skacinta feat. Radhi OAG)	Bottom 3
Akma no.2	"Camar Yang Pulang" (Aishah)	Safe
Amy no.3	"Antara Anyir dan Jakarta" (Sheila Majid)	Eliminated
Amylea no.4	"Hak Milik Kekal" (Diana Rafar & Linda Rafar)	Safe
Ekin no.5	"Let's Get Loud" (Jennifer Lopez)	Safe
Felix no.7	"Hari Ini dan Semalam" (J. Mizan)	Safe
Kefli no.10	"Berhenti Berharap" (Sheila on 7)	Safe
Marsha no.11	"Bossanova" (Saloma)	Safe
Mawi no.12	"Beautiful Maria of My Soul" (Los Lobos)	Safe
Reza no.13	"Ala Emak Kahwinkan Aku" (Zainodin Mat Dom)	Eliminated
Yazer no.14	"Takdir Penentu Segala" (Jamal Abdillah)	Safe

- Guest judges: Mamat Khalid & Ning Baizura

=== Week 6 ===
Original Airdate: 9 July 2005

Student	Song	Result
Aidil no.1	"Matahari" (Amuk)	Eliminated
Akma no.2	"Hati Keliru" (Misha Omar)	Bottom 3
Amylea no.4	"Hati Ini Telah Dilukai" (Krisdayanti)	Safe
Ekin no.5	"Warna" (Sheila Majid)	Bottom 3
Felix no.7	"Smooth" (Santana)	Safe
Kefli no.10	"Kenang Daku Dalam Doamu" (Tan Sri S.M. Salim)	Safe
Marsha no.11	"Destiny" (Jim Brickman)	Safe
Mawi no.12	"Memori Cinta Luka" (Nassier Wahab)	Safe
Yazer no.14	"Cinta Kilat" (Broery Marantika)	Safe

- Guest judges: Iman Wan & Sharifah Aini

=== Week 7 ===
Original Airdate: 16 July 2005

Student	Song	Result
Bonus	"Aneka Ragam" (Black Dog Bone)	N/A
Akma no. 2	"Bertakhta Di Hati" (Farahdhiya)	Bottom 3
Amylea no.4	"Penawar Rindu" (Datin Orkid Abdullah)	Safe
Ekin no.5	"Maafkan Kepergianku" (Ruth Sahanaya)	Eliminated
Felix no.7	"Fantasia Bulan Madu" (Search)	Safe
Kefli no.10	"You to Me Are Everything" (The Real Thing)	Safe
Marsha no.11	"Jambatan Tamparuli" (Justin Lusah)	Safe
Mawi no.12	"Oh Fatimah" (A. Ramlie)	Safe
Yazer no.14	"Nazraku" (Spider)	Bottom 3

- Guest judges: S. Atan & Zainal Alam Kadir

=== Week 8 ===
Original Airdate: 23 July 2005

Student	Song	Result
Bonus	"Ladki Badhi Anjani Hai" (OST - Kuch Kuch Hota Hai) "Seri Langkat" (Jamal Abdillah & Amelina)	N/A
Akma no.2	"Selamat Jalan Romeo" (Ramlah Ram)	Eliminated
Amylea no.4	"Dua Insan Bercinta" (Ella)	Safe
Felix no.7	"Hukum Karma" (Wings)	Safe
Kefli no.10	"Hati Emas" (M. Nasir)	Bottom 3
Marsha no.11	"Cobalah Untuk Setia" (Krisdayanti)	Bottom 3
Mawi no.12	"Pupus" (Dewa)	Safe
Yazer no.14	"Mengapa Harus Cinta" (Vince Chong)	Safe

- Guest judges: Syafinaz Selamat & Yasmin Ahmad

=== Week 9 ===
Original Airdate: 30 July 2005

Student	Song	Result
Amylea no.4	"Gemilang" (Jaclyn Victor)	Safe
Felix no.7	"Anak" (Freddie Aguilar)	Safe
Kefli no.10	"Tak Tahu" (Tak Tahu)	Eliminated
Marsha no.11	"Ku Pendam Sebuah Duka" (Khatijah Ibrahim)	Bottom 3
Mawi no.12	"Pergi Tak Kembali" (Rabbani)	Safe
Yazer no.14	"This Love" (Maroon 5)	Eliminated

- Guest judges: Suraya Al Attas & Vince Chong

=== Week 10 ===
Original Airdate: 6 August 2005

Student	Song	Result
Amylea no.4	"Sweet Child o' Mine" (Guns N' Roses) "Ku Berserah" (Amylea)	Third
Felix no.7	"Kudaku Lari Gagah Berani" (Sharifah Aini) "Warkah Berlagu Pilu" (Felix)	Runner-Up
Marsha no.11	"Manusia" (Sheila Majid) "Untuk Terakhir Kali" (Marsha)	Fourth
Mawi no.12	"Seroja" (Jamal Abdillah) "Aduh Saliha" (Mawi)	Winner

- Guest judges: Adlin Aman Ramlie & Syafinaz Selamat

== Students ==
(ages stated are at time of contest)

Student	Age	Hometown	Out
Elliza Abdul Razak	21	Kuala Lumpur	no.6
Fuad Razlan Abdul Azri	20	Kuala Lumpur	no.8
Nor Farah Idayu Yaakob	20	Kota Bharu, Kelantan	no.9
Syaiful Reza Mohamed	27	Sibu, Sarawak	no.13
Amylia "Amy" Mohd Azlan	21	Kuching, Sarawak	no.3
Nik Mohd Aidil Nik Zamri	21	Kuala Lumpur	no.1
Norashikin "Ekin" Abdul Rahman	21	Labuan	no.5
Asiah Tunakma Abdullah	20	Kuala Lumpur	no.2
Mohd Zulkefli Mohd Idir	21	Kuala Lumpur	no.14
Mohd Yazer Yusof	23	Tawau, Sabah	no.10
Marsha Milan Londoh	20	Tamparuli, Sabah	no.11
Amylea Azizan	19	Langkawi, Kedah	no.4
Felix Agus	23	Kota Belud, Sabah	no.7
Asmawi Ani	23	Kulai, Johor	no.12

== Post Akademi Fantasia Careers ==
- Elliza Abdul Razak is currently active in acting in serial drama.
- Syaiful Reza Mohamed was chosen as a host of interactive show Durian Runtuh in Astro Ria. He is also one of the deejays in ERA fm. In 2006, he appeared in the filming entertainment as "Azam" in a film entitled Malaikat Maut directed by Bade Hj Azmi. In 2008, he was chosen to be the host for a new TV show in Astro Ria called Kelab POP.
- Asiah Tunakma Abdullah has released her first single entitled Percaya Pada Cinta in 2007.
- Mohd Yazer Yusof has signed with a recording label, Luncai Emas and is currently recording his first album.
- Marsha Milan Londoh is currently the ambassador for Power Root. She is also active in acting and has appeared in several telemovies and dramas such as Begitulah Raya, Misi:1511, Kirana and recently in Kerana Karina as the main cast.
- Felix Agus is also one of the ambassadors for Power Root. He has also appeared in acting entertainment with fellow Marsha Milan Londoh in Begitulah Raya. His compilation album The Best of Felix Susah Susah Aje!! achieved platinum status while his video compilation of the same title went gold.
- Asmawi Ani was chosen as the Chosen Artist of DiGi in ERA Award 2005. In the same year as well, he won the Most Popular Artist in Anugerah Bintang Popular, and garnered other several awards such as Best New Male Artist, and Best New Male Singer, all in the same year in the prestigious award. In 2006, he won the Most Popular Song in Planet Music Award, Favourite Malaysian Artist of MTV Asia Award and won the ethnic creative song in Anugerah Juara Lagu 2006. He is also chosen to be ambassador for many products such as Power Root, Mamee Slurp, M.Mobile, Canon, Silky For Men, and Herba.

== Summaries ==
=== Elimination Chart ===
Voting Result In Rank Order
Order	Weekly Concert										
Order	Prelude	1	2	3	4	5	6	7	8	9	10
1	Elliza	Felix	Mawi	Mawi	Mawi	Mawi	Mawi	Mawi	Mawi	Mawi	Mawi
2	Ekin	Idayu	Felix	Felix	Felix	Felix	Felix	Felix	Felix	Felix	Felix
3	Amylea	Reza	Reza	Yazer	Yazer	Yazer	Amylea	Amylea	Amylea	Amylea	Amylea
4	Felix	Amylea	Marsha	Amylea	Amylea	Kefli	Marsha	Marsha	Yazer	Marsha	Marsha
5	Idayu	Yazer	Amylea	Reza	Marsha	Amylea	Yazer	Kefli	Kefli	Yazer	
6	Amy	Kefli	Ekin	Ekin	Kefli	Marsha	Kefli	Yazer	Marsha	Kefli	
7	Aidil	Ekin	Amy	Kefli	Ekin	Ekin	Ekin	Akma	Akma		
8	Fuad	Amy	Idayu	Marsha	Amy	Akma	Akma	Ekin			
9	Kefli	Fuad	Yazer	Aidil	Akma	Aidil	Aidil				
10	Yazer	Akma	Kefli	Akma	Reza	Amy					
11	Reza	Elliza	Akma	Idayu	Aidil	Reza					
12	Akma	Aidil	Aidil	Amy	Idayu						
13	Azlif	Mawi	Fuad	Fuad							
14	Diana	Marsha	Elliza								
15	Haider										
16	Isa										
17	Marsha										
18	Mawi										
19	Rina										
20	Shiha										

The student won the competition
The student was the runner-up
The student was the first runner-up
The student was finalist
The student was the original eliminee but was saved
The students were re-entered into the competition through Principal's choice or 'AFSERAP'
The student did not participate in the concert and was disqualified
The student was eliminated

- In Prelude, the group of 20 contestants were reduced to 12 that would move on to the main competition as the new AF students. This first call-out does not reflect their performance in this week.
- In Week 1, there was no elimination. Subsequently, Mawi and Marsha were chosen by the Principal to be re-entered into the competition through 'AFSERAP', after their failures to be chosen in Prelude Concert.
- In Week 5, there was a double elimination. The concert was held in Dataran Putrajaya.
- In Week 9, there was another double elimination.

== Cast members ==
=== Hosts ===
- Aznil Nawawi - Weekly Concert & Diaries

=== Professional trainers ===
- M. Nasir - Principal
- Adnan Abu Hassan - Vocal Technical
- Mohd Fathee Abdullah - Choreographer
- Linda Jasmine - Choreographer
- Dr. Azahari Othman - Motivator Consultant
- Fatimah Abu Bakar - Student Consultant & English Consultant
- Marlia Musa - Stage Presentation
- Siti Hajar Ismail - Voice Tone
- Mahani Awang - Image Consultant
- Roslina Hassan - Resident Manager

=== Judge ===
- Kudsia Kahar

== Season statistics ==
- Total number of students: 14
- Oldest student: Syaiful Reza Mohamed, 27 years old
- Youngest student: Amylea Azizan, 19 years old
- Tallest student: Felix Agus, 5'9" (175 cm)
- Shortest student: Amylea Azizan & Norashikin Abdul Rahman, both 4'8" (149 cm)
- Heaviest student: Fuad Razlan Abdul Azri, 154 lb (70 kg)
- Lightest student: Amylea Azizan & Norashikin Abdul Rahman, both 92 lb (42 kg)
