= Akademi Fantasia season 2 =

Akademi Fantasia
- Season 2
- Hosted by: Aznil Nawawi
- Judges: Kudsia Kahar
- Winner: Ahmad Zahid Baharuddin
- Runner-up: Norlinda Nanuwil
- Finals venue: Putra Indoor Stadium

Release
- Original network: Astro Ria
- Original release: 7 June – 14 August 2004

Season chronology
- ← Previous; Season 1 Next → Season 3

The second season of Akademi Fantasia premiered on 7 June 2004 and concluded on 14 August 2004 on the Astro Ria television channel. Aznil Nawawi continued as the show's host, while Kudsia Kahar returned as judges. The second season was won by Ahmad Zahid Baharuddin, who defeated Norlinda Nanuwil. This season also featured Kaer Azami, who would subsequently win the 2008 Malaysian Music Awards for Best Song.

Unlike previous season which was solely opened for people from Peninsular Malaysia, this season was eligible for contestants from East Malaysia. The final 12 contestants were revealed in Tirai Akademi Fantasia which was aired at the end of May and early June.

A new format this season was introduced which enabled a student who was eliminated to be re-entered into the competition through a voting line called AFMASUK. Using this voting line, audience would vote any students who were eliminated throughout the season and the one student who received the highest votes would be re-entered into the competition. This new format is subsequently used in seasons 4, 7 and 8.

This entire season holds the highest reception of votes in the history of Akademi Fantasia with 15 million votes being cast.

== Students ==
(ages stated are at time of contest)

Student	Age	Hometown	Rank
Ahmad Zahid bin Baharuddin	22	Teluk Intan, Perak	Winner
Norlinda Nanuwil	20	Ranau, Sabah	Runner-up
Mohammad Aizam bin Mat Saman	21	Kota Kinabalu, Sabah	3rd place
Farah Diana binti Anuar	19	Kuala Lumpur	4th place
Yusrizan bin Usop	23	Limbang, Sarawak	5th place
Wan Mohammad Khair bin Wan Azami (Kaer)	19	Kuala Lumpur	6th place
Asma binti Ghani	23	Tawau, Sabah	7th
Nurullah binti Zawawi	22	Kuching, Sarawak	8th
Zarina binti Zainoordin	20	Johor Bahru, Johor	9th
Anding Indrawani bin Zaini	21	Kuching, Sarawak	10th
Mohammad Fitri bin Zainal Abidin	25	Kuala Lumpur	11th
Edlin binti Abdul Rahim	21	Kuala Lumpur	12th

== Concerts summaries ==
=== Week 1 ===
- Original airdate: 12 June 2004
- Guest judges: Awie & Rashid Sibir

Student	Song (original artist)
Farah	"Seandainya Masih Ada Cinta" (Dayang Nurfaizah)
Zahid	"Percayakan Siti" (Exists)
Zarina	"Mencintaimu" (Krisdayanti)
Bob	"Wajah Kesayangan Hamba" (Hail Amir)
Edlin	"Bintang Hati" (Amy Mastura)
Fitri	"Jerat" (Harvey Malaiholo)
Nurul	"Sejakku Bertemu Padamu" (Sanisah Huri)
Anding	"Jika Kau Bercinta Lagi" (Alleycats)
Mas	"Permata Biru" (Ella)
Adam	"Jangan Lafazkan" (KRU)
Linda	"Tak Tahan Lagi" (Melly Goeslaw)
Kaer	"Januari" (Glenn Fredly)

- Bottom two: Edlin binti Abdul Rahim (Edlin) & Mohd Fitri bin Zainal Abidin (Fitri)
- Eliminated: No elimination

=== Week 2 ===
- Original airdate: 19 June 2004
- Guest judges: Dato' Yusof Haslam & Farihin Abdul Fatah

Student	Song (original artist)
Anding	"Melompat Lebih Tinggi" (Sheila On 7)
Nurul	"Ke Hujung Dunia" (Siti Sarah)
Bob	"Jangan Bersedih Lagi" (Anuar Zain)
Edlin	"Can't Fight the Moonlight" (LeAnn Rimes)
Adam	"Kerana Dia" (Yasin)
Fitri	"Kasih Latifah" (Spider)
Mas	"Kaulah Segalanya" (Ruth Sahanaya)
Farah	"Tua Mengejar Kita" (Fauziah Latiff)
Zahid	"Istana Menanti" (Rahim Maarof)
Zarina	"Awallah Dondang" (Noraniza Idris)
Kaer	"Ikhlas Tapi Jauh" (Zainal Abidin)
Linda	"Semoga Abadi" (Misha Omar)

- Bottom two: Edlin binti Abdul Rahim (Edlin) & Yusrizan bin Usop (Bob)
- Eliminated: No elimination

=== Week 3 ===
- Original airdate: 26 June 2004
- Guest judges: Jenny Chin & Radhi OAG

Student	Song (original artist)
Fitri	"Ku Petik Bintang Bintang" (Kenny, Remy & Martin)
Nurul	"Seri Dewi Malam" (Dato' Sharifah Aini)
Zahid	"Bila Resah" (Anuar Zain)
Farah	"Janji Manismu" (Aishah)
Bob	"Tanya Sama Itu Hud Hud" (M. Nasir)
Edlin	"Kau Dan Aku" (Ning Baizura)
Anding	"Slumber" (OAG)
Zarina	"My Immortal" (Evanescence)
Kaer	"Kenanganku" (Jeffrydin)
Linda	"Leaving On A Jet Plane" (Chantal Kreviazuk)
Adam	"Mengapa Perpisahan Yang Kau Pinta" (Flybaits)
Mas	"Seksis" (Anita Sarawak)

- Bottom two: Edlin binti Abdul Rahim (Edlin) & Nurullah binti Zawawi (Nurul)
- Eliminated: Edlin binti Abdul Rahim (Edlin)

=== Week 4 ===
- Original airdate: 3 July 2004
- Guest judges: Kak Cham & Mamat Khalid

Student	Song (original artist)
Bob	"Pantun Budi" (Tan Sri SM Salim)
Nurul	"Bawalah Daku Pergi" (Anita Sarawak)
Fitri	"Bayangan Tarimu" (Carefree)
Linda	"Madah Berhelah" (Ziana Zain)
Anding	"Ayu" (VE)
Farah	"Dancing Queen" (ABBA)
Zahid	"Teratai" (Sweet Charity)
Zarina	"Satu Cinta Dua Jiwa" (Siti Nurhaliza)
Kaer	"If You're Not The One" (Daniel Bedingfield)
Mas	"Tegar" (Rossa)
Adam	"Gerhana" (Hattan)

- Bottom two: Mohd Fitri bin Zainal Abidin (Fitri) & Yusrizan bin Usop (Bob)
- Eliminated: Mohd Fitri bin Zainal Abidin (Fitri)

=== Week 5 ===
- Original airdate: 10 July 2004
- Guest judges: Andy Flop Poppy & Shuhaimi Baba

Student	Song (original artist)
Kaer	"Habis Sudah Umpanku" (Azizi)
Farah	"Tenda Biru" (Dessy Ratnasari)
Anding	"Merisik Khabar" (Sudirman)
Mas	"Can't Get You Out of My Head" (Kylie Minogue)
Bob	"Akar Dan Bumi" (Amuk)
Linda	"Bunga Melur" (P. Ramlee)
Adam	"Tipah Tertipu" (Ruffedge)
Nurul	"Bersamamu" (Ezlynn)
Zahid	"Warna Kehidupan" (Yusry)
Zarina	"Pulangkan" (Misha Omar)
All	Bonus song: "Jangan Pisahkan" (Deddy Dores & Mayangsari)

- Bottom two: Anding Indrawani bin Zaini (Anding) & Yusrizan Usop (Bob)
- Eliminated: Anding Indrawani bin Zaini (Anding)

=== Week 6 ===
- Original airdate: 17 July 2004
- Guest judges: Hetty Koes Endang & Hani Mohsin

Student	Song (original artist)
Mas	"Semakin Hari Semakin Sayang" (Uji Rashid)
Kaer	"Epilog Cinta Dari Bromley" (Sohaimi Mior Hassan)
Farah	"Ya Maulai" (Siti Nurhaliza)
Bob	"I Can See Clearly Now" (Jimmy Cliff)
Adam	"Keroncong Untuk Ana" (M. Nasir)
Zarina	"Penantian" (Bienda)
Nurul	"Ku Mohon" (Sheila Majid)
Zahid	"Where is the Love?" (Black Eyed Peas)
Linda	"Panti Asuhan" (Hetty Koes Endang)
All	Bonus song: "Memory" (Cats)

- Bottom two: Zarina binti Zainoordin (Zarina) & Asma binti Ghani (Mas)
- Eliminated: Zarina binti Zainoordin (Zarina)

=== Week 7 ===
- Original airdate: 24 July 2004
- Guest judges: Saiful Apek & Zainal Abidin

Student	Song (original artist)
Nurul	"Lucky" (Britney Spears)
Bob	"Salam Terakhir" (Sudirman)
Linda	"Akan Ku Tunggu" (Candy)
Kaer	"Bunga Pujaan" (Jamal Abdillah)
Farah	"Jangan Kau Mimpi" (Siti Sarah)
Zahid	"Cinta Sakti" (Def Gab C)
Mas	"Tamparan Wanita" (Elite)
Adam	"Smooth Criminal" (Michael Jackson)
All	Bonus song: "Kita Insan Biasa" (Dayangku Intan & Jay Jay + "Dua Insan" (M. Nasir & Yunizar Hussein)

- Bottom two: Nurullah binti Zawawi (Nurul) & Norlinda Nanuwil (Linda)
- Eliminated: Nurullah binti Zawawi (Nurul)

=== Week 8 ===
- Original airdate: 31 July 2004
- Guest judges: Anuar Zain & Erma Fatima

Student	Song (original artist)
Mas	"Yayadan" (Dato' Sharifah Aini)
Zahid	"Semusim" (Marcell)
Farah	"Bebas Berlari" (Nora)
Adam	"Kasih" (Broery Marantika)
Linda	"Syurga Idaman" (Azizah Mohammad)
Bob	"Alhamdullilah" (Too Phat & Yasin)
Kaer	"Mentera Semerah Padi" (M. Nasir & Spider)
All	Bonus song: "Party Like This" (VE); Medley Song: "Joget Mak Enon" (Carefree) + "Joget Kenangan Manis" (Sudirman) + "Joget Sindir Pesan" (Black Dog Bone)

- Bottom two: Norlinda Nanuwil (Linda) & Asma binti Ghani (Mas)
- Eliminated: Norlinda Nanuwil (Linda)

=== Week 9 (Semifinal) ===
- Original airdate: 7 August 2004
- Guest judges: Jalaluddin Hassan & Misha Omar

Student	Song (original artist)
Zahid	"Cik Mek Molek" (Dato' M. Daud Kilau)
Farah	"Mengapa" (Nicky Astria)
Kaer	"Fantasia" (Hazami)
Bob	"Laguku Untukmu" (Hasnol)
Adam	"Bila Larut Malam" (Saloma)
Mas	"Aku Cinta Padamu" (Sheila Majid)
All	Bonus song: "Greatest Love Of All" (George Benson)

- Bottom two: Asma binti Ghani (Mas) & Yusrizan bin Usop (Bob)
- Eliminated: Asma binti Ghani (Mas)
- AF MASUK: Norlinda Nanuwil (Linda)

=== Week 10 (Finale) ===
- Original airdate: 14 August 2004
- Guest judges: Farihin Abdul Fatah & Mamat Khalid

1st Round Performance

Student	Song (original artist)
Adam	"Oh La! La!" (KRU)
Zahid	"Biarlah Bulan Bicara" (Broery Marantika)
Linda	"Aku Cinta Kamu" (Linda); Composed: Ajai / Lyric: Nurul
Bob	"Gadis Sarawak" (Hasnol)
Farah	"Tangisan Dalam Kerinduan" (Farah); Composed & Lyric: Adnan Abu Hassan
Kaer	"Sway" (Michael Buble)

2nd Round Performance

Student	Song (original artist)
Adam	"Haruskah" (Adam); Composed: Ajai / Lyric: Nurul
Zahid	"Milikku" (Zahid); Composed: Cat Farish / Lyric: Azad Addin
Linda	"Only You" (Enrique Iglesias)
Bob	"Cinta Seorang Teman" (Bob); Composed: Adnan Abu Hassan / Lyric: Fareez
Farah	"Skater Boi" (Avril Lavigne)
Kaer	"Kembali Bersama" (Kaer); Composed: Johan Farid Khairuddin / Lyric: Fareez

- Sixth place: Wan Mohammad Khair bin Wan Azami (Kaer)
- Fifth place: Yusrizan bin Usop (Bob)
- Fourth place: Farah Diana binti Anuar (Farah)
- Third place: Mohammad Aizam bin Mat Saman (Adam)
- Runner-up: Norlinda Nanuwil (Linda)
- Winner: Ahmad Zahid bin Baharuddin (Zahid)

== Elimination chart ==
Voting Result in Rank Order

Order	Weekly Concerts									
Order	1 (12/6)	2 (19/6)	3 (26/6)	4 (03/7)	5 (10/7)	6 (17/7)	7 (24/7)	8 (31/7)	9 (07/8)	Finale (14/8)
1	Linda	Mas	Mas	Nurul	Zahid	Linda	Zahid	Farah	Adam	Zahid
2	Kaer	Linda	Linda	Mas	Kaer	Zahid	Bob	Adam	Farah	Linda
3	Mas	Adam	Kaer	Farah	Mas	Bob	Kaer	Kaer	Zahid	Adam
4	Adam	Kaer	Farah	Linda	Farah	Farah	Mas	Zahid	Kaer	Farah
5	Farah	Zarina	Adam	Kaer	Nurul	Nurul	Adam	Bob	Bob	Bob
6	Zarina	Zahid	Fitri	Zahid	Adam	Kaer	Farah	Mas	Mas	Kaer
7	Bob	Farah	Zahid	Adam	Linda	Adam	Linda	Linda	Linda	
8	Zahid	Nurul	Bob	Anding	Zarina	Mas	Nurul			
9	Nurul	Fitri	Anding	Zarina	Bob	Zarina				
10	Anding	Anding	Zarina	Bob	Anding					
11	Fitri	Bob	Nurul	Fitri						
12	Edlin	Edlin	Edlin							

- Winner
- Runner-up
- Third place
- Finalist
- AF MASUK
- Saved
- Eliminated

Trivia

- Week 1 and Week 2 featured non-elimination concerts. The accumulated votes were forwarded to the following week.
- In week 9, Linda was re-entered into the competition after scoring the highest votes through AFMASUK.

== Cast members ==
=== Hosts ===
- Aznil Nawawi - Host of concert, Imbasan Akademi Fantasia and Diari Akademi Fantasia.

=== Professional trainers ===
- Ramlie M.S. - Principal & Music Director
- Adnan Abu Hassan - Vocal Technical
- Corrie Lee - Choreographer
- Linda Jasmine - Choreographer
- Dr. Abdullah Sher Kawi Jaafar - Motivator Consultant
- Fatimah Abu Bakar - Student Consultant
- Fauziah Nawi - Stage Presentation
- Siti Hajar Ismail - Voice Tone
- Mahani Awang - Image Consultant
- Roslina Hassan - Resident Manager

=== Judge ===
- Kudsia Kahar

== Season statistics ==
- Total number of students: 12
- Oldest student: Mohd Fitri Zainal Abidin, 25 years old
- Youngest student: Farah Diana Anuar & Wan Mohammad Khair Wan Azami, both 19 years old
- Tallest student: Wan Mohammad Khair "Kaer" bin Wan Azami, 5'10.5" (179 cm)
- Shortest student: Nurullah Hamid, 4'11" (150 cm)
- Heaviest student: Yusrizan Usop, 205 lb (93 kg)
- Lightest student: Nurullah Abdul Hamid, 82 lb (37 kg)
