= Nana Mahazan =

- Born: Nurul Hana binti Che Mahazan; July 1, 1983 (age 42); Muar, Johor
- Origin: Malaysia
- Years active: 2003–present

Nurul Hana binti Che Mahazan (born July 1, 1983), better known by her stage name Nana Mahazan, is a Malaysian actress, television host, radio announcer and singer. She came in seventh place on the first season of Akademi Fantasia in 2003. Even though she did not win, she became a successful Malaysian singer and actor.

She used to write a column called "Bicara Nana" ("Nana's Discussion") in Harian Metro on Sundays. Nana appeared in a Soy Talk advertisement and as of 2012 she was the product's ambassador. She was a popular DJ at one of Malaysia's most popular radio stations, Era.fm. In 2004, she hosted an Era segment called "Petang di Era" (Evening@Era) with Seelan Paul. She extended her contract with Era from 2005 to 2006, and hosted "Pagi@Era with Adi" and various segments including "Carta Era" (Era Charts) with Aznil.

In November 2009, Nana shifted to another radio station, XFM.

== Biography ==
She was born Nurul Hana Binti Che Mahazan. She is of Malay descent. She is the second of four siblings in a middle-class family. Her elder brother plays guitar while the younger one plays drum.

Nana married Mohamed Raqeem Brian Abdullah, a manager of Hitz.fm radio station, on 6 June 2009, in her hometown in Muar, Johor.

== Akademi fantasia ==
Nana was the 7th student to be voted out of 12 students in the academy.

== Discography ==
- Album Evolusi 1

== Filmography ==
=== Film ===
Year	Title	Role	Notes
2005	Gangster		
2009	Maut		Cameo
2009	Sifu & Tongga	Host Programmes Pelik Tapi Benar	Cameo

=== Television ===
Year	Title	Role	TV channel
2006	Galaksi	Host	TV9
2017	Ketuk-Ketuk Ramadan	Guest	TV1
2017–2018	Nasi Lemak Kopi O	Host	TV9
2020	HTV	Host	TV1

== Awards and nominations ==
Year	Award
2005, 2006, 2007	Anugerah Berita Harian nomination for 'Penyampai Radio Wanita Popular'
2004	Anugerah Personaliti dan Hiburan
