= Akademi Fantasia season 1 =

Akademi Fantasia
- Season 1
- Hosted by: Aznil Nawawi; Seelan Paul
- Judges: Kudsia Kahar
- Winner: Vincent Chong Ying-Chern
- Runner-up: Mohammad Khairul Nizam Mohammad Wahi
- Finals venue: Dewan Wawasan, Cheras

Release
- Original network: Astro Ria
- Original release: 9 June – 9 August 2003

Season chronology
- Next → Season 2

The first season of Akademi Fantasia premiered on 9 June 2003 and continued until 9 August 2003, on the Astro Ria television channel. It was won by Vincent Chong Ying-Chern, who defeated Mohammad Khairul Nizam Mohammad Wahi.

This season managed to cast as much as 4.5 million votes from the audience.

== Students ==
(ages stated are at time of contest)

Student	Age	Hometown	Rank
Vincent Chong Ying-Cern	23	Kuala Lumpur	Winner
Mohammad Khairul Nizam bin Mohammad Wahi	23	Tampoi, Johor	Runner-up
Ahmad Azizi bin Mohamed	27	Kuantan, Pahang	3rd place
Siti Harnizah binti Tahar	20	Johor Bahru, Johor	4th place
Nurlizawaty binti Ismail	23	Taiping, Perak	5th place
Sahri bin Mohammad Sarip	24	Melaka	6th
Nurul Hana binti Che Mahazan	20	Muar, Johor	7th
Rosmayati binti Sidik	18	Kuantan, Pahang	8th
Rueben Thevandran a/l Ramananth	21	Kuala Lumpur	9th
Suriati binti Abu Bakar	21	Bentong, Pahang	10th
Adi Fashla bin Jurami	21	Tanjung Karang, Selangor	11th
Azariah binti Suaymi	21	Kuala Lumpur	12th

== Concerts summaries ==
=== Week 1 ===
- Original airdate: 14 June 2003
- Guest judge: -

Student	Song (original artist)
Nija	"Engkau Bagaikan Permata" (Siti Nurhaliza)
Sahri	"Selingkar Kasih" (Rem)
Khai	"Perpisahan" (The Revolvers)
Azza	"Memori" (Sheila Majid)
Liza	"Sampai Bertemu" (Erra Fazira)
Vince	"Pergilah Kasih" (Ella & Korie)
Azizi	"Gadis Ayu" (Black Dog Bone)
Atie	"Hi Hi Bye Bye" (Ezlynn)
Nana	"Kini Kau Tiada" (Sarimah Ibrahim)
Adi	"Kau Ilhamku" (Man Bai)
Rosma	"Sekadar Di Pinggiran" (Francissca Peter)
Burn	"Livin La Vida Loca" (Ricky Martin)

- Bottom two: Nurlizawaty binti Mohd Ismail (Liza) & Suriati binti Abu Bakar (Atie)
- Eliminated: No elimination.

=== Week 2 ===
- Original airdate: 21 June 2003
- Guest judge: -

Student	Song (original artist)
Atie	"Ku Intai Cinta Dalam Rahsia" (Jeslina Hashim)
Burn	"Kasih Berubah" (Ferhad)
Azza	"Siapalah Aku" (Amy Mastura)
Khai	"Syair Si Pari Pari" (Zamani)
Nija	"Menaruh Harapan" (Zaiton Sameon)
Sahri	"When You Say Nothing At All" (Ronan Keating)
Liza	"Sha Na Na" (Amy Mastura)
Vince	"Flying Without Wings" (Westlife)
Rosma	"Bukan Cinta Biasa" (Siti Nurhaliza)
Adi	"Dan" (Sheila on 7)
Nana	"Rindu Padanya" (Camelia)
Azizi	"Terasing" (Sudirman)

- Bottom two: Azariah binti Suaymi (Azza) & Nurlizawaty binti Mohd Ismail (Liza)
- Eliminated: Azariah binti Suaymi (Azza)

=== Week 3 ===
- Original airdate: 28 June 2003
- Guest judges: Ellie Suriati & Johan Nawawi

Student	Song (original artist)
Adi	"Biru" (Jai)
Nija	"Dendam Dalam Diam" (Nora)
Sahri	"Salsabila" (Yasin)
Liza	"Kesetiaan" (Siti Sarah)
Burn	"Permata" (Anuar Zain)
Atie	"Save The Best For Last" (Vanessa Williams)
Nana	"Ku Bahagia" (Melly Goeslaw)
Khai	"Jesnita" (Exists)
Vince	"Belaian Jiwa" (Innuendo)
Rosma	"Bunga Tanjung" (Dato' Sharifah Aini)

- Bottom two: Adi Fashla bin bin Jurami (Adi) & Nurlizawaty binti Mohd Ismail (Liza)
- Eliminated: Adi Fashla bin Jurami (Adi)

=== Week 4 ===
- Original airdate: 5 July 2003
- Guest judge: Pak Ngah & Azhar Sulaiman

Student	Song (original artist)
Vince	"Manis" (Zainal Abidin)
Nija	"Setelah Aku Kau Miliki" (Shima)
Khai	"Azura" (Jamal Abdillah)
Liza	"Dia" (Sheila Majid)
Burn	"Sabar Menanti" (Broery Marantika)
Nana	"I Will Survive" (Gloria Gaynor)
Azizi	"Mungkinkah Terjadi" (Spider)
Rosma	"Tinting" (Noraniza Idris)
Atie	"Jendela Hati" (Erra Fazira)
Sahri	"Tekad" (Hazami)
All	Bonus song: "Sandarkan Pada Kenangan" (Jamal Abdillah & Siti Sarah)

- Bottom two: Suriati binti Abu Bakar (Atie) & Nurlizawaty binti Mohd Ismail (Liza)
- Eliminated: Suriati binti Abu Bakar (Atie)

=== Week 5 ===
- Original airdate: 12 July 2003
- Guest judges: Siti Nurhaliza & Azwan Ali

Student	Song (original artist)
Girls	Bonus song: "Di Akhir Garisan" (Ziana Zain, Nora, Ning Baizura & Dessy Fitri)
Khai	"Terima Kasih" (Awie)
Liza	"Oops!... I Did It Again" (Britney Spears)
Burn	"Sephia" (Sheila On 7)
Rosma	"Tragedi Buah Epal" (Anita Sarawak)
Sahri	"Keabadian Cinta" (Anuar Zain)
Azizi	"She Bangs" (Ricky Martin)
Nija	"Layar Impian" (Ella)
Vince	"Bunyi Gitar" (P. Ramlee)
Nana	"Halaman Cinta" (Misha Omar)
Boys	Bonus song: "Tiada Lagi Cinta" (Ruffedge)

- Bottom two: Rueben Thevandran a/l Ramananth (Burn) & Siti Harnizah binti Tahar (Nija)
- Eliminated: Rueben Thevandran a/l Ramananth (Burn)

=== Week 6 ===
- Original airdate: 19 July 2003
- Guest judge: Hanizam Abdullah (Berita Harian's Editor)

Student	Song (original artist)
Liza	"Bagaikan Puteri" (Farra)
Khai	"6, 8, 12" (Brian McKnight)
Nana	"Hapuslah Air Matamu" (Dato' Sharifah Aini)
Sahri	"Raikan Cinta" (M. Nasir)
Nija	"Fatalistik" (Ziana Zain)
Vince	"Sonata Musim Salju" (Hazami)
Rosma	"Sinaran" (Sheila Majid)
Azizi	"Seribu Impian" (Casey)
All	Bonus song: "Jika" (Melly Goeslaw & Ari Lasso) + "One Sweet Day" (Mariah Carey & Boyz II Men)

- Bottom two: Rosmayati binti Sidik (Rosma) & Nurul Hana binti Che Mahazan (Nana)
- Eliminated: Rosmayati binti Sidik (Rosma)

=== Week 7 ===
- Original airdate: 26 July 2003
- Guest judges: Hattan & Ahmad Izham Omar

Student	Song (original artist)
All	Bonus song: "Bole Chudiyan" (Alka Yagnik & Udit Narayan & Kavita Khrisnamurthy)
Nana	"Desa Tercinta" (Nora)
Azizi	"Samba Apa Saja" (Hattan)
Liza	"Bunga Bunga Cinta" (Misha Omar)
Vince	"Samrah Mentari" (Jamal Abdillah)
Nija	"Jelingan Mata" (Saloma)
Sahri	"Sekuntum Mawar Merah" (Alleycats)
Khai	"Aladin" (Spider)
All	Bonus song: "Hanya Memuji" (Shanty & Marcell) + "Asereje" (The Last Ketchup)

- Bottom two: Nurul Hana binti Che Mahazan (Nana) & Siti Harnizah binti Tahar (Nija)
- Eliminated: Nurul Hana binti Che Mahazan (Nana)

=== Week 8 (Semifinal) ===
- Original airdate: 2 August 2003
- Guest judges: Tan Sri SM Salim & Anita Sarawak

Student	Song (original artist)
Azizi	"Gerimis Mengundang" (Slam)
Nija	"How Do I Live" (LeAnn Rimes)
Sahri	"Anugerah Dari Kegagalan" (Dato' Shake)
Liza	"Cinta Gila" (Juliana Banos)
Khai	"Vida" (Phyne Ballerz)
Vince	"Rindu Bayangan" (Carefree)
All	Bonus song: "Keliru" (Ajai & Nurul) + "Khayalan" (Black Dog Bone)

- Bottom two: Sahri bin Mihd Sarip (Sahri) & Vincent Chong Ying-Cern (Vince)
- Eliminated: Sahri bin Mohd Sarip (Sahri)

=== Week 9 (Finale) ===
- Original airdate: 8 August 2003
- Guest judges: Ramli M.S & Erra Fazira

1st Round Performance

Student	Song (original artist)
Liza	"Pintaku Yang Terakhir" (Dayang Nurfaizah)
Azizi	"Habis Sudah Umpanku" (Azizi); Composed: Marlin / Lyric: Loloq
Khai	"Dambaan Pilu" (Khai); Composed: Adnan Abu Hassan / Lirik: Mohariz Yaakub
Vince	"Pernah" (Ferhad)
Nija	"Kenangan Pahit" (Nija); Composed: Ananth / Lyric: Fanna

2nd Round Performance

Student	Song (original artist)
Liza	"Jangan Pura Pura" (Liza); Composed: Hadi Hassan / Lyric: J. Looi
Azizi	"Piramid Cinta" (Jai)
Khai	"Seberapa Pantas" (Sheila on 7)
Vince	"Tak Ingin Kehilanganmu" (Vince); Composed: Hadi Hassan / Lyric: J. Looi
Nija	"Selagi Ada Cinta" (Ning Baizura)

- Fifth place: Nurlizawaty binti Ismail (Liza)
- Fourth place: Siti Harnizah binti Tahar (Nija)
- Third place: Ahmad Azizi bin Mohamed (Azizi)
- Runner-up: Mohammad Khairul Nizam bin Mohammad Wahi (Khai)
- Winner: Vincent Ching Ying-Cern (Vince)

== Elimination chart ==
Voting Result in Rank Order

Order	Week 1	Week 2	Week 3	Week 4	Week 5	Week 6	Week 7	Week 8	Week Finale
1	Rosma	Sahri	Vince	Vince	Rosma	Sahri	Liza	Azizi	Vince
2	Sahri	Vince	Sahri	Nana	Khai	Liza	Azizi	Nija	Khai
3	Vince	Rosma	Azizi	Rosma	Sahri	Vince	Vince	Liza	Azizi
4	Nija	Azizi	Atie	Khai	Vince	Nija	Khai	Khai	Nija
5	Khai	Nana	Rosma	Sahri	Nana	Khai	Sahri	Vince	Liza
6	Nana	Khai	Burn	Azizi	Liza	Azizi	Nija	Sahri	
7	Azizi	Atie	Nana	Burn	Azizi	Nana	Nana		
8	Adi	Burn	Khai	Nija	Nija	Rosma			
9	Burn	Nija	Nija	Liza	Burn				
10	Azza	Adi	Liza	Atie					
11	Atie	Liza	Adi						
12	Liza	Azza							

- The student who is a winner.
- The student who is runner-up.
- The student who became third place.
- The student who is finalists.
- The student is originally eliminated but saved.
- The student who is eliminated.

== Cast members ==
=== Hosts ===
- Aznil Nawawi - Host of concert of Akademi Fantasia and Diari Akademi Fantasia
- Seelan Paul – Host of Imbasan Akademi Fantasia

=== Professional trainers ===
- Freddie Fernandez - Principal
- Adnan Abu Hassan - Vocal Technical
- Corrie Lee - Choreographer
- Linda Jasmine - Choreographer
- Fatimah Abu Bakar - Student Consultant
- Siti Hajar Ismail - Voice Tone
- Mahani Awang - Image Consultant
- Roslina Hassan - Resident Manager

=== Judge ===
- Kudsia Kahar
