= Rueben Thevandran =

Malaysian radio personality

Born
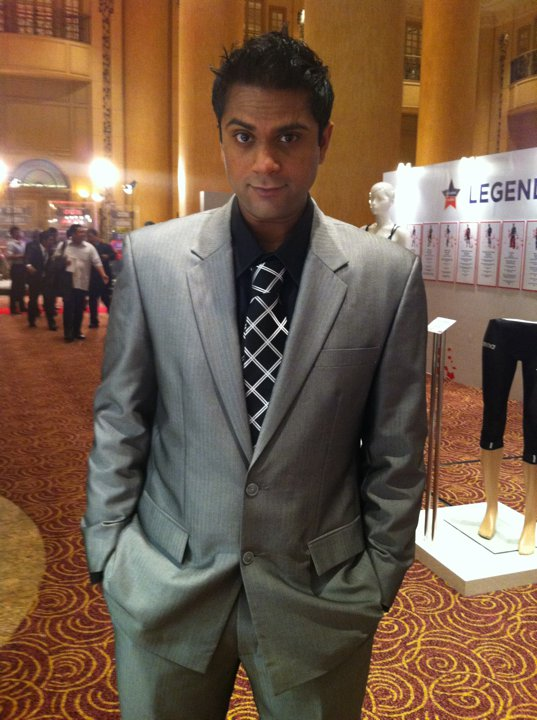
- Burn at Astro Arena 1st year anniversary
- Born: Rueben thevandran April 9, 1982 (age 44); Kuala Lumpur, Malaysia
- Occupations: Radio Announcer, Television Personality and Singer
- Years active: 2003–present

Rueben Thevandran s/o Ramanath (born April 9, 1982), better known by his stage name Burn, is a Malaysian radio personality, television host, singer and voice-over. He is the host of Aktifpedia, a sports educational show, and Grandstand Ahad, a live review and update of the latest sport happenings in Malaysia, on Astro Arena and Forum throughout Malaysia. On the radio, Burn used to be a radio announcer for X-Fresh before moving to Era FM.

== Early life ==
Burn was born on 9 April 1982 in Kuala Lumpur. Malaysia, the son of Joyce John, a single mother. Burn has one sister, "Sharmila". Burn's first time in the spotlight was at the age of 22 after receiving a diploma from the Malaysian Institute Of Integerative Media. He joined Malaysia's first reality television show in which a number of contestants, called students, competed for the winning title and a chance to start their career in the entertainment industry. The show was called Akademi Fantasia, widely known as AF.

== Career ==
In 2004, after his Akademi Fantasia fame, Burn was called upon to make countless TV appearances either as a Host, Guest or Singer on shows such as Era TV, Fulus Mania, Hitz.TV, and Xfresh TV. Apart from TV jobs, he has also had print publicity for his album Ini Janjiku. Burn's hit singles "Kasih Ibu" and "I Can See Now" earned him nominations for local award shows such as Muzik Muzik and Anugerah Era. Burn eventually moved towards TV hosting. He started off hosting the Fulus Mania gameshow on Astro Ria and continued with Era TV on Astro Ria before joining Astro Arena and Grandstand Ahad He voiced-over another local soccer show Masa Tambahan Arena Bola.

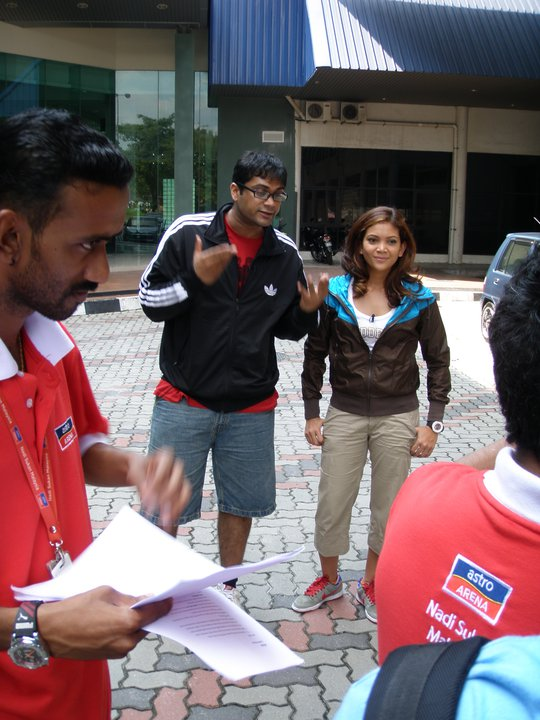
Burn and his co-host, Azura during Aktifpedia shoot

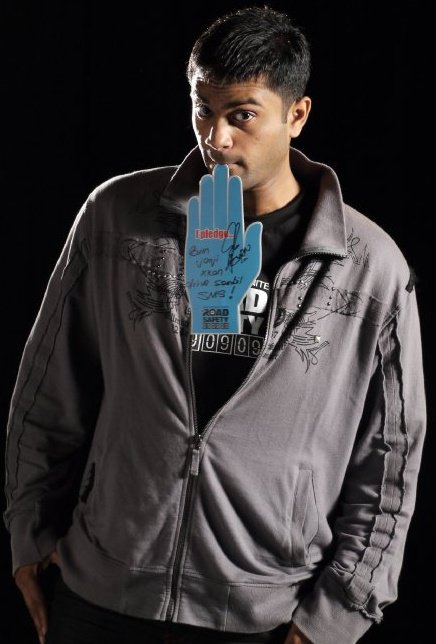
Burn in MUFORS Campaign Music Video

== Radio ==
Burn's radio career started in 2004 with Xfresh FM. After 4 years he quit in defeat and joined Era FM for another 2 years before leaving for TV as a sports TV host. Amongst the highlights of his radio career was that he headed the prime time show on Xfresh Fm called Zon Planet X with hit segments like "Panggilan Kena Burn" and "Usha Usha". On Era, Burn teamed up with "Cham" former VE singer and "Adifashla" his former "AF" partner on the drive show Petang Era & Malam Era. As a top radio announcer and TV host, Burn received endorsements from Nike, HI-5,Listerine & Revive Isotonic.

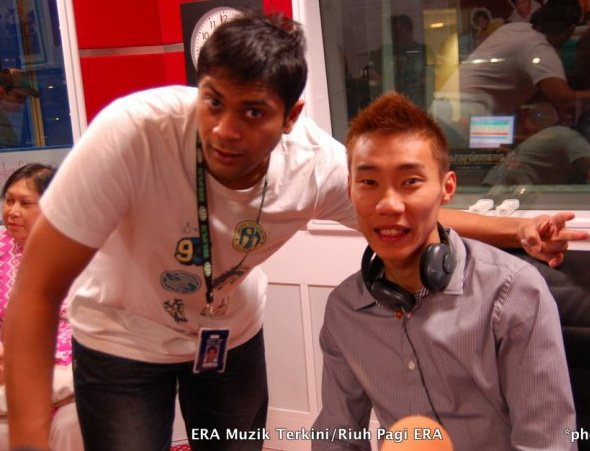
Burn with Dato' Lee Chong Wei at Era FM Studio

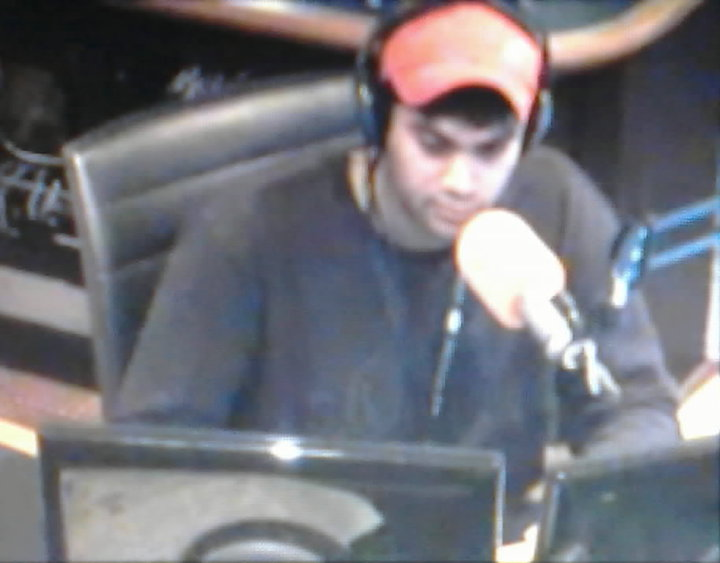
Burn as Radio Announcer

== Credit ==
Radio

- X-Fresh FM: Radio Announcer
- Era FM: Radio Announcer

Television

- Aktifpedia: Host
- Grandstand Ahad: Host
- Era TV: Host
- Hitz TV: Host
- X-Fresh TV: Host
- Fulus Mania: Host
- Era TV: Host

Music

- Ini Janjiku: Album
- Neduvan: Album
- I can see now: Single
- Kasih Ibu: Single
- MUFORS All Stars: Malaysians Unite for Road Safety: Callaborate with other Artists
- BoBoiBoy: Soundtrack
- The call: Theme song for Arthur's day 2011
