= Akademi Fantasia =

Malaysian reality television show

- Akademi Fantasia logo in use from 2013 to 2016.
- Created by: Francel Diaz Lenero; Daniel Ortiz
- Theme music composer: Aubrey Suwito
- Country of origin: Malaysia
- Original language: Malay
- No. of seasons: 13
- No. of episodes: 137

Production
- Running time: approximately 3 hours

Original release
- Network: Astro Ria (All seasons); Astro Maya HD (Akademi Fantasia 2013 and Akademi Fantasia 2014); Astro Ria HD (Akademi Fantasia 2016)
- Release: 3 June 2003 – 9 October 2016

Related
- Big Stage

Akademi Fantasia (commonly abbreviated as AF) is Malaysia's first reality television show in which a number of contestants called students compete for the winning title and a chance to start their career in the entertainment industry. The first season premiered on 3 June 2003 and was one of Astro Ria's highest rated shows. The theme song entitled "Menuju Puncak" was performed by Juwita Suwito, who is the sister of the composer, Aubrey Suwito.

The format of the show is taken from "La Academia", which originated from Mexico. Malaysia is the first country in Southeast Asia to have its own version of the show. Subsequently, it has also been followed by Indonesia and Thailand, which garners positive response in comparison to the Idol series.

The show made its own history in Season 5 when Norsyarmilla Jirin was crowned as the first female winner, breaking the streak of male winners for the first four seasons. The record was later continued when Stracie Angie Anam was declared as the winner of Season 6. On 13 January 2011, it was announced that the ninth season will be the last season of the original Akademi Fantasia.

"Akademi Fantasia" returned for season 10 in year 2013. It has the same name as the first season in the franchise, and fans usually refer to this program as New Akademi Fantasia or Akademi Fantasia 2013 to distinguish it from the original.

Akademi Fantasia 2014 use season 1 until season 9 format.

== Show format ==
Each season of Akademi Fantasia has 10 concerts including the finale, and starts with 12-16 contestants who are called students. However, in Season 3 and Season 4, a prelude concert was conducted to determine the ultimate students. Once the ultimate students are chosen, they will stay in a house called Akademi, practising songs, acting and dancing lesson, and other activities that are related with performing arts for a period of 10 weeks. The classes are held by professional trainers, called teachers, who have an established career in the entertainment industry. Diari Akademi Fantasia, which is aired on weekdays, showcases the students' activities in the academy. The academy is led by a principal, which varies every year. However, in Season 6, the academy is led by Ramli M.S, who is the academy principal of Season 2.

The judging system totally depends on audiences' SMS votes (called as 'AFUNDI') and Astro decoder votes (Astro users may need to connect their decoders to the phone line to vote). The student with the lowest vote will be eliminated at the end of the weekly concert, though in rare cases a double elimination, a triple elimination or no elimination was given by consensus of the production panel.

Nevertheless, there are cases where eliminated students are recruited into the competition through a voting line called 'AFMASUK'. In this case, audiences are given a chance to vote for all the eliminated students within a short period of time. The student who receives the highest vote will be recruited back into the competition.

The eight season saw a new change to the format of Akademi Fantasia. Instead of eliminating a student at the end of each concert, the elimination process is conducted in a new 30-minute segment called Debaran Akademi Fantasia, one day after the concert.

On 13 January 2011, it was announced that the ninth season will be the last season of the original Akademi Fantasia. In this season, a new format is implemented where students who do not show any improvement will be expelled by the management in a twist known as Operasi Gugur to give opportunity for new students to join the academy. The announcement was made at the end of the second concert in Season 9. In addition, the elimination process returns to its original format where each student is eliminated at the end of concert every week.

In 2013, after 2 years on hiatus, Akademi Fantasia has returned for the new season and also been called as "AF2013". This season shows different format from previous seasons, whereas "duo (partner)" also can join this season. While in term of Diari, this season did not show students life in their academy (house) but more focus on dancing and singing lesson. This season also did not restrict student from bringing mobile phone, which is restricted in all previous seasons, which also there are no restriction from outside world. The major different of AF2013 is there are 3 "inspirer" who will lead this season trainers, unlike previous season which Principal as the head trainers.

In 2014, Season 11 has returned and used the old format (AF1–AF8). AFSERAP is introduced this season. It was introduced due to heavy demand by viewers. However, what make it different from AFMASUK is the fact that the recruited student was not selected by voting line, but by recommendations from Faculty teaching members.

== Host ==
Season 1 (AF2003)	Season 2 (AF2004)	Season 3 (AF2005)	Season 4 (AF2006)	Season 5 (AF2007)	Season 6 (AF2008)	Season 7 (AF2009)	Season 8 (AF2010)	Season 9 (AF2011)	Season 10 (AF2013)	Season 11 (AF2014)	Season 12 (AF2015)	Season 13 (AF2016)	AF Megastar (2017)
Aznil Nawawi					AC Mizal		Jimmy Shanley & Sarimah Ibrahim	Aznil Nawawi	Zizan Razak	Zizan Razak & Faizal Ismail		Zizan Razak & Alif Satar	Aznil Nawawi

== Judges ==
Season	Season 1 (AF2003)	Season 2 (AF2004)	Season 3 (AF2005)	Season 4 (AF2006)	Season 5 (AF2007)	Season 6 (AF2008)	Season 7 (AF2009)	Season 8 (AF2010)	Season 9 (AF2011)	Season 10 (AF2013)	Season 11 (AF2014)	Season 12 (AF2015)	Season 13 (AF2016)	AF Megastar (2017)
Judges	Season 1 (AF2003)	Season 2 (AF2004)	Season 3 (AF2005)	Season 4 (AF2006)	Season 5 (AF2007)	Season 6 (AF2008)	Season 7 (AF2009)	Season 8 (AF2010)	Season 9 (AF2011)	Season 10 (AF2013)	Season 11 (AF2014)	Season 12 (AF2015)	Season 13 (AF2016)	AF Megastar (2017)
Judges 1	Kudsia Kahar			Adlin Aman Ramlie	Ogy Ahmad Daud		Adlin Aman Ramlie		Ogy Ahmad Daud	Edry Abdul Halim	Dato' Ramli M.S			
Judges 2					Hattan	Ning Baizura	Dato' Khadijah Ibrahim	Aznil Nawawi	Hattan	Sharifah Amani	Raja Azura	Rozita Che Wan	Dato' AC Mizal	Datuk Syafinaz Selamat
Judges 3					Fauziah Latiff		Edrie Hashim					Roslan Aziz		

=== Hosts & judges ===
Aznil Haji Nawawi, who hosted the show for the first five seasons, announced his retirement as the host for Akademi Fantasia at the end of Season 5 due to scheduling conflicts. He was replaced by AC Mizal in Season 6 and seventh season. In Season 8, Sarimah Ibrahim and Jimmy Shanley were selected as the new hosts replacing AC Mizal. In season eight, Aznil Haji Nawawi returned to Akademi Fantasia as one of the judges. However, in the ninth season, he is appointed as the host, replacing Jimmy Shanley and Sarimah Ibrahim. Since season 10, Zizan Razak replaces Aznil Haji Nawawi while Faizal Ismail joined Zizan as a co-host from season 11. In season 12, Alif Satar became a new co-host replacing Faizal Ismail.

As of the eleventh season, the current judges are Dato Ramli MS & Raja Azura. Previous judges include Kudsia Kahar, Fauziah Latiff, Ning Baizura, Khatijah Ibrahim, Edrie Hashim, Fauziah Ahmad Daud, Datuk Hattan, Edry Abdul Halim, Sharifah Amani and Roslan Aziz. Usually, an additional guest judge will be featured in every concert.

=== Relationship with Astro Ria's entertainment news programmes ===
Akademi Fantasia was very connected with Astro Ria's entertainment programme Trek Selebriti in the latter part of the 2000s. During AF season, students who are eliminated in every concert will be featured in this programme which showcases their life journey before and after being selected as an AF students. Following the promotion to host the weekly concerts of Akademi Fantasia, Jimmy Shanley, who has been hosting Trek Selebriti since it first aired, was later replaced by Khairil Azam Pilus, who was a runner-up of the seventh season of the Akademi Fantasia. which later became the last season of Trek Selebriti. After Trek Selebriti has ended, Propaganza has become main programme to feature all eliminated student from Season 10. In 2014, H!LIVE, a then-brand new entertainment news programme that reports on celebrity news and gossip has become the major programme to broadcast about AF2014.

=== Criticism ===
The main controversy during Akademi Fantasia season is about the judging system which is solely based on the audience through SMS and Astro decoder without professional jury. This judging system is heavily criticised because of allegations that most audience only vote for their favourite contestants, as well as judging the contestants based on their looks rather than their talents.

When the production team announced that Season 6 of Akademi Fantasia would be eligible for those aged from 18 to 45 years old, the show continued to be criticised for choosing contestants whom were rejected from other reality TV shows. Furthermore, the selection of two female contestants in Season 6, Hairina Abdul Halim, a grandmother of two grandchildren, as well as Siti Norsaida Tarudin, the eldest sister of Siti Nurhaliza were said to be the most important element of the season which was aimed to draw audience's attention and further guarantee vast publicity to raise the show's rating.

=== Sponsorship ===
Since the introduction of the Akademi Fantasia, Hotlink has been closely associated with the branding of the show. Nevertheless, the eight instalment of the show witnessed the departure of Hotlink as the major sponsorship after seven consecutive years of sponsoring the show. The sponsorship was taken over by Cerebos with its branding of Brands, Innershine and the Generasi Hebat campaign. While in 2013, Samsung was the main sponsor for AF2013 with Kit Kat. Samsung left after one season while Kit Kat, together with D'Herbs and Felda Wellness have become main sponsor for AF 2014.

== Seasons ==
Season	Winner	Runner-up	Third	Finalist(s)	Other contestants in order of elimination	Number of contestants
AF 1	Vincent Chong Ying-Cern	Mohammad Khairul Nizam Mohammad Wahi	Ahmad Azizi Mohamed	Siti Harnizah Tahar & Nurlizawaty Mohd Ismail	Azariah Suaymi, Adi Fashla Jurami, Suriati Abu Bakar, Rueben Thevandran, Rosmayati Sidik, Nurul Hana Che Mahazan, Sahri Mohd Sarip	12
AF 2	Ahmad Zahid Baharuddin	Norlinda Nanuwil	Mohd Aizam Mat Saman	Farah Diana Anuar, Yusrizan Usop & Wan Mohammad Khair Wan Azami	Edlin Abdul Rahim, Mohd Fitri Zainal Abidin, Anding Indrawani Zaini, Zarina Zainoordin, Nurullah Abd Hamid, Asma Ghani	12
AF 3	Asmawi Ani	Felix Agus	Amylea Azizan	Marsha Milan Londoh	Elliza Abdul Razak, Fuad Razlan Abd Azri, Nor Farah Idayu Yaakob, Syaiful Reza Mohamed, Amylia Mohd Azlan, Nik Mohd Aidil Nik Zamri, Norashikin Abdul Rahman, Asiah Tunakma Abdullah, Mohd Yazer Yusof, Mohamed Zulkefli Mohd Idir	14
AF 4	Mohammad Faizal Ramly	Lotter P.Edwin Edin	Nur Farhan Azizan	Hazwan Haziq Rosebi & Velvet Lawrence Aduk	Nordawati Daud, Karen Tan Lee Suan, Richael L. Gimbang, Nur Azilah Seeron, Nor Salima Habibi, Syamsul Hirdy Muhid, Amirul Azwan Mohd. Ghazali	12
AF 5	Norsyarmilla Jirin	Ebi Kornelis	Muhammad Nur Aswad Jafar	Nur Heliza Helmi & Candra Clement	Wan Nurul Zhana Wan Mohd Hanizan, Adyana Khalid, Mohd Shafiq Mohd Ramadzan, Nurul Fatin Yahya, Mohd. Farha Jasmen, Nonny Nadirah Zainuddin, Aryanna Najwa Ahmad, Hasfarizal Ayub, Muhammad Aizat Amdan, Gadaffi Ismail Sabri, Mohd Shawal Ruslan	16
AF 6	Stracie Angie Anam	Mohd Idris Mohd Zaizizi	Ahmad Nubhan Ahamad	Khairul Nizam Baharom & Nadia Haswani Hasnan	Marliyana Omar Walid, Ika Nabila Abdul Rahim, Lutfyah Sheikh Omar, Muhammad Shauqi Naaim Salmi, Muhammad Faisal Abdullah, Siti Norsaida Tarudin, Hairina Abdul Halim, Mohamad Alif Mohd Razali, Stanley Maringai David Impi	14
AF 7	Mohd Hafiz Mohd Suip	Khairil Azam Pilus	Akim Ahmad	Mohd Yazid Ibrahim & Ismaliza Ismail	Nas Adila Mohd Dan, Ahmad Sobri Hasmuni, Zuzafrini Zulkifli, Rubisa Tiasin, Nur Fazelah @ Zizie Mad Tahil, Mohd Rashidi Mohamad Isa, Mohd Qhauhd Abdul Rashid, Claudia Fay Geres, Siti Aishah Bujang	14
AF 8	Ahmad Shahir Zawawi	Siti Adira Suhaimi	Muhd Shahril Firdaus Eli	Muhd Firdaus Maulana Mohamed & Emirza Azwan Zulazrin Chew	Muhammed Shahril Mohd Saleh Hussein, Erma Suhaimi, Dayang Nor Anum Arjuna Aharun, Muhammad Alif Kadim, Nadia Emilia Roselan, Zafarina Jamhari, Nadiawati Ainul Basir	12
AF 9	Hazama Ahmad Azmi	Lenaber Hadir	Nur Syafinaz Jebat	Mohamad Azri Abdullah	Zulaika Zahari, Nur Atiqah Shariffudin, Roshammizah Rosli, Nur Suhada Jebat, Mohamad Amirullah Jahari, Fahrur Raqib Abdul Majid, Ahmad Afif Tirmizie, Nur Khaidir Muhid, Queennera Francine Francis Kitingon, Hairul Najmuddin Abu Samah	14
AF 2013	Mohd Faizul Sany	Hal Husaini Razmi[Hael]- Mohd Azhar Osman [Azhar] (Azhael-Duo)	Nadia Amira Othman	Siti Ruhailah Hussein, Nur Nabila Mohd Razali, Nur Aisyah Aziz	Kamsani Jumahat, Chin Teik Meng, Muhammad Ikhtiman Che Ismail, Rasmawatie Mohd Thamrin, Irmiza Sahabuddin[Irmiza] - Irsa Sahabuddin[Irsa](Irmisa-Duo), Abdul Suhadah Unding	12 (14)
AF 2014	Mohd Firman Bansir	Mohd Razman Abd Aziz	Ikhwal Hafiz Ismail	Syamila Nuhair Zainordi, Adeline Joyce Masidah	Walfadhilah Suhaizat, Muhammad Fareezuan Adnan, Muna Shahirah Munadi, Nor Aziha Md Salleh, Muhd Zharif Mohd Kamil, Nina Nadira Naharuddin, Azwan Satar	12
AF 2015	Mohammad Sufie Rashid	Syameel Aqmal Mohd Fodzly	Nurnajmi Nabila Samsaidi	Muhammad Shahrul Amin Kamarozaman	Allyssa Joanne Anak Jambi, Ang Hui San, Muhammad Ikhwan Alif Salim, Muhammad Amyroulfarouk Mohd Nor, Anthonasius Jadil, Aziah Awang, Nurhusnina Haziqah Naharuddin, Sharifah Nabilah Syed Azhar	12
AF 2016	Amir Syazwan Masdi	Mohd Amal Shafiq Osman	Kareshma Martin John Patrick	Nurfarrah Izzatie Johari, Nur Hafizah Longkip @ Thomas	Mohd Fara Aidid Ali Dad Khan, Halmy Hamizan, Azarul Rais Mansor, Isyariana Che Azmi, Jasper James Supayah, Muhd Ikram Kamaruzzaman, Siti Aishah Abdul Razak, Mohd Afzarul Dzarif Mohd Mazle, Nurul Rahila Rashun	14
AF Megastar 2017	Idayu	Marsha	Syamel	Bob, Shahir	Amir, Amir J, Sufi, Indah Ruhaila, Firman, Adira, Ewal, Azhar	24

Note:Akademi Fantasia in Season 13 (2016) Concert Week 2 (25 August 2016) have three elimination and Elimination student is Isa, Halmy, Rais.

Note:Akademi Fantasia in Season 13 (2016) Concert Week 5 (18 September 2016) have three elimination in early concert and Elimination Student is Amy, Riana and Jasper

== International versions ==
- Indonesia: Akademi Fantasi Indosiar - has finished 5 seasons. The show return for the sixth instalment in 2013 after 7 years of hiatus. Season 1 was aired in December 2003, on Indosiar.
- Mexico: La Academia - Original Format has finished 14th season, in 2020.
- Thailand: Academy Fantasia - has finished airing its eighth season in September 2011, the ninth season will begin in June 2012.
- United States: La academia USA - The first season was aired on 20 November 2005.
- Singapore: Academy Fantasia - The first season was aired in 2012.
- Central America: La Academia Centroamérica - The first season was aired in 2013 in Guatemala.
