= Vince Chong =

Malaysian musician

- 张英胜 張英勝
- Born: Vincent Chong Ying-Cern; 30 September 1979 (age 46); Kuala Lumpur, Malaysia
- Occupation: Singer
- Years active: 2003–present
- Website: twitter.com/Yingcern

Vincent Chong Ying-Cern (simplified Chinese: 张英胜; traditional Chinese: 張英勝; pinyin: Zhāng Yīngshèng; Jyutping: Zoeng1 Jing1 Sing3; Pe̍h-ōe-jī: Tiuⁿ Eng-sèng; born 30 September 1979), known by his stage name Vince, is a Malaysian singer. Initially gaining traction from appearing on and winning the reality show Akademi Fantasia, Vince started a solo career shortly after and appeared on projects such as the Asian version of High School Musical.

== Early life and career ==
His father was Chong Chen Kian, of Chinese ethnic origin, and mother Susan Ann Higgs from England. He has four younger siblings: Pamela, Daniel, Ian and Sean; and an older sister, Vanessa. Pamela and Vanessa competed in The Amazing Race Asia 2 and finished as runners-up. Sean is one of the singers of Budi Bahasa Budaya Bangsa (1 Malaysia version), representing Pan-ASEAN.

He started singing when he was a child and was involved in several church plays, singing competitions and modelling advertisements with his sister Vanessa. He performed a solo opera at the age of 14 in front of more than 2000 people.

He had experience in several church plays and theatre as a director and script writer. In college Chong formed a band called IBNOT. The band played several genres of music including rock, R'n'B, jazz, and alternative. Chong also had experience in recording back-up vocals for professional artistes, such as Ferhad in Anugerah Industri Muzik Awards in 2001.

=== Akademi Fantasia ===
Chong's first serious singing competition was in the 2002 edition of Astro Talent Quest (ATQ). Not fluent in Mandarin (as he speaks Cantonese, English and Malay), Vince had a challenge to learn and memorise the Mandarin songs to remain in the competition. Chong became the first runner-up to Nicholas Teo, who won the competition that year.

In 2003, after returning from his holiday in Gold Coast, Australia, Vanessa and Rueben (Burn AF1) encouraged him to join Akademi Fantasia for its inaugural season. Chong and Rueben went to the audition in KL and successfully became part of the 12 AF finalists. Chong was crowned the winner for Akademi Fantasia's 1st season, with Khai as 1st runner up and Azizi as 2nd runner up. He received an offer to do a duet with Malaysian singer Nora a song titled Dilema'03 for her greatest hits album.

Upon winning Akademi Fantasia, Chong and his 11 classmates made a roadshow of Akademi Fantasia around Malaysia and Brunei. The group were interviewed by Azwan Ali on his talk show Cit Cat Azwan. The fans had voted them as the best newcomers interviewed in Cit Cat Azwan Award in 2003. Chong made his final appearance in a group when they toured in Brunei.

== Vince ==
Chong decided to leave Maestro Talent to be an "independent" singer by joining EMI Malaysia. It was a "very hard" journey for Chong when his best friend-cum-competitor Khai overshadowed him with his "Dambaan Pilu". His self-titled debut Vince was highly anticipated, featuring his single Mengapa Harus Cinta? which entered several music charts. Chong was selected as one of the artistes to have a song in Anugerah Juara Lagu. He was also placed third in the Asia New Singer Competition at Shanghai Music Festival 2004.

In 2004 and 2005, Chong received several awards, and he accepted an offer to be the lead actor for Yusof Haslam's new film Sembilu 2005.

In 2005, he was chosen to sing one of the songs in the soundtrack for Puteri Gunung Ledang, titled "Keranamu Kekasih".

=== Janji Vince ===
In 2005, his second album Janji Vince was released, receiving mixed reactions from fans and critics. The album was said to be superior in quality compared to his first album, but it sparked controversy when Vince pronounced the Arabic word Taala, one of the titles of Allah, in his song Berkobar-bokar. Later, the composer of the song Yassin clarified that the Taala actually means "to come".

He had been invited frequently to perform in private function and gospel shows and was highly in demand for Christmas performances in television.

Chong represented Malaysia to sing the special Asian release edition of the hit Breaking Free (from Disney's High School Musical), alongside Singaporean Alicia Pan and Filipino Nikki Gil. In 2007, Chong and Nikki Gil teamed up as a Host for High School Musical: Around The World which was aired on Disney Channel.

=== Percayalah Sayang ===
In 2007, Chong launched his compilation album Percayalah Sayang. This album was meant as Vince's big step into the regional music scene, especially Indonesia where he wrote and recorded the album. The new songs in the album, particularly, Percayalah Sayang, were described as inclined toward alternative rock.

Chong sang the Malaysian version of You Are the Music in Me (from Disney's High School Musical 2) and Bahasa Melayu version entitled "Kau Muzik Di Hatiku" alongside fellow Malaysian singer Jaclyn Victor, with the music video filmed in Putrajaya. Chong and Victor ran a nationwide mall tour followed for fans of the High School Musical franchise. The video of their version of the song was released on the Special Edition DVD of High School Musical 2 (2008).

=== Frogway 2007 ===
Chong was cast as Eddy The Singing Frog for Frogway 2007. Frogway was first performed on 30 July 1980, with a cast that included S. Jayasankaran as Eddy, and Indi Nadarajah. Frogway was the first made-in-Malaysia musical. Frogway 2007 was directed by comedian Harith Iskander. The cast also included Ash Nair, Harith Iskander, Elaine Daly, Chelsia Ng, Ina Febregas, Marielle Febregas and Thor Kah Hoong.

The show was performed 23 August to 2 September 2007 at Actor Studio Bangsar. Chong stated that acting in musical theatre was very challenging but good for his voice control, as he trained for a few months just to make sure he would be fit physically.

Chong was involved in composing commercial jingles for Rakan Muda, which were aired as a Malaysian local television advertisement. He then focused on television production and started his personal company, InVinceAble Tunes. He admitted to local entertainment magazines that he had experienced back pain since last July and was working hard to regain his fitness.

Chong has expressed his desire to produce a Mandarin-language album one day, not only to penetrate the Chinese-speaking market but also to fulfill his late grandfather's wish to see his grandson sing in his mother tongue.

He released a Christmas album, the launch of which was conducted at a bar in Damansara Perdana. Over 100 guests, media and fans attended the event. He was joined on stage by Burn, Daniel Veerapen and his brother Sean Chong. The album includes many re-makes of old Christmas classics, while other songs are sung traditionally.

== Fan Club and Website ==
Chong fans had established a Fan Club in 2004, known as "BelovedFans" or BFs. In 2005, one of the BFs had established a website nameed BelovedFans as Chong did not have an official website.

One of Chong BF's Official committee members ran Chong's Myspace Fan Club. Chong occasionally updates his activity and chats with his fans at a Yahoo! Group.

== Discography ==
=== Albums ===
Date of release	Album title	Single(s)
2004 EMI Malaysia	Vince	Mengapa Harus Cinta; Andai Kau Mengerti; Killer Smile
2004 SRC Malaysia/EMI Malaysia	Puteri Gunung Ledang Soundtrack	Keranamu Kekasih
2006 EMI Malaysia	Janji Vince	Janji janji; Cinta Cinta Cinta; 3 words; Berkobar-kobar
2006 Walt Disney Records Asia/EMI Malaysia	High School Musical (Asian Version)	Breaking Free
2007 EMI Malaysia	Percayalah Sayang	Percayalah Sayang; Tuhan Tolonglah
2007 Walt Disney Records Asia/EMI Malaysia	High School Musical 2 (Malaysia Distribution)	You Are the Music in Me; Kau Muzik Di Hatiku
2010 New Southern Records (NSR) Malaysia	Kronologi Cinta (Malaysia Distribution)	Biarkan

== Filmography ==
=== Television ===
Year	Title	Role
2020	The Masked Singer Malaysia	contestant
2019	Dilema	as actor (television movie)
2016	Baba Nyonya	main role
2007 eve	Night of Soulful Stars	Teamed up with Taufik Batisah, Mia Palencia, Ning Baizura
2007	High School Musical; Around the World	Host
2006	Malaysia National Anthem	Teamed up with Syafinaz Selamat, Dayang Nurfaizah, Reshmonu, Ning Baizura and Hazami
2006	Hitz.tv Top 30	Guest artiste with Rueben and Marsha Londoh
2006	Hitz.tv amplified	Teamed up with Rueben and Marsha Londoh
2006	Jalan Jalan Cari makan	Guest appearance
2006	Hitz.tv amplified	Himself
2006	Zoom in RTM1	Host/Himself
2005	Macam-Macam Aznil	Talkshow guest with Ziana Zain
2004	RTM 2 Gong Xi fa Chai	Guest artiste
2004	Dari Studio 1	Host/Himself
2004	MTV	Interviewing Kelly Clarkson
2003	Rumah Terbuka Anita Sarawak	Guest actor
2003	Hiburan Minggu ini - Siti Nurhaliza	Guest artiste
2003	Rumah Terbuka Akademi Fantasia	All 12 AF students

=== Films ===
Year	Title	Role
2005	Sembilu 2005	Main Role

=== Theater ===
Year	Title	Role
2007	Frogway 2007	Main Role
2013	The Producers	Leopold Bloom

== Achievements ==
- 1st Runner-Up in Astro Talent Quest, 2002
- Winner in Akademi Fantasia Season 1
- Best Non-Malay Artist in Media Hiburan, 2003
- Best New Artist (Male) in Anugerah ERA, 2004
- Best New Artist (Male) in ABH'2004
- Best Non-Malay Artist (Male) in ABH'2004
- Best New Artist (Male) in AIM 12
- Best New Artist (Male) in APM 2004
- Bronze in Asia New Singer Competition at Shanghai Music Festival, 2004
- Finalist for Juara lagu, Balada 2004
- Finalist Male Artist, ABP 2005
- Finalist Male Artist, AIM 2005
- Finalist Male Artist, APM 2005
- Finalist Lead Actor, Festival Filem Malaysia 2005
- Collaboration with Disney's HSM soundtrack "Breaking Free" 2006
- Collaboration with Disney's HSM2 soundtrack "You're Music in Me" with Jaclyn Victor 2007

=== Advertisement ===
- Model for Hotlink Aktifkan Dirimu 2003–2005
- Model for Kotex "Women in My Life" 2004
- More than 20 front covers featured in Malaysian Entertainment Magazines
- Contributing song and voice for Rakan Muda, 's Advertisement 2008
