= Broery =

Broery Marantika
- Also known as: Broery Pesulima
- Born: Simon Dominggus Pesulima; 25 June 1948; Ambon, Maluku, Indonesia
- Died: 7 April 2000 (aged 51) Cinere, Indonesia
- Genres: Blues, jazz
- Occupations: Singer, actor
- Instruments: Vocals
- Years active: 1971–2000
- Label: Musica Studios
- Website: http://www.broery.com

Simon Dominggus "Broery" Pesulima (25 June 1948 – 7 April 2000) was an Indonesian singer and actor.

== Early life ==
During his career he also used the name Broery Marantika taken from his mother's family name. He was raised by the family of his mother's uncle, Simon Marantika. His father named Gijsberth Pesulima while her mother called Wilmintje Marantika. Broery had three brothers, namely Henky, Freejohn and Helmi. Since young age Broery is a member of the church choir in Ambon.

In 1964 he won the singing contest held by Radio Republik Indonesia (RRI) in Ambon. A year after he moved to Cinere, Jakarta and started his career as a professional singer with Remy Leimena. Helmi Pesulima was a known singer. Broery made the first album recorded in 1968–1969. He was known for starring a role in movie "Akhir Sebuah Impian" in 1971 and in the movie Pesulima sang two songs "Angin Malam" and "Mimpi Sedih". One of the famous song is "Duri Dalam Cinta".

Pesulima had a stroke in 1998 and on 7 April 2000, he died in hospital Cinere Puri, Cinere. He was in and out of hospital before that. Pesulima left a wife and two children.

== Personal life ==
Broery got married for the first time in Singapore to local performer, Anita Sarawak and subsequently took on the name Broery Ridwan Abdullah. After his divorce from Sarawak, he reverted to using his original name and to his Christian faith. Later, he married Wanda Irene Latuperisa. They had two children, named Indonesia Putra Pesulima and Nabila Methaya Pesulima.

== Honors and awards ==
- He was winner in 1997 with his song Letters To Kekasih at Malaysia Official Music Industry Award (AIM).
- In 1996 The Best of Sound Track Album of the Movie at Malaysia Eliminate Air Mata (wipe your tears)
- Awarded in 1991 Categories in Cinere in Festival Best Music Video, Clip, Sound track, Producer Broery composition and singing songs in Once There Was Love

== Albums ==
- 2000 "Selamat Tinggal" exclusive solo
- Cinta Kilat Album Cinta
- The best of Broery Marantika "Hati yang Terluka"
- 30 years in review vol 2 "Daku Cari Jalan Terbaik"
- 30 years in review vol 3 " Angin Malam"
- Best of the best Top Pop vol 2 "Jangan Kau Menangis"
- Persembahanku Album "Untukmu" 1970
- 20 Golden Best "Mawar Berduri"
- "Balada Seorang Biduan"
- Koleksi Hits 1970 - 2000 "Kasih"
- Memories Hit's Broery Marantika "Kaulah Segalanya"
- "Mengapa Harus Bertengkar" duet with Dewi Yull.
- Tembang Kenangan vol 5 "Hapuslah Air Matamu"
- Tembang - tembang 1970 "Sepanjang jalan kenangan"
- Tembang Kenangan "Resah"
- 1989 "Aku Begini kau Begitu" : You're My inspiration : Before You Go.
- 1992 The best collection of Broery Marantika ( Kuala Lumpur Mal: Warner Music WEA )
- 1993 "Dalam Gelora Cinta"

== Music Award ==
- 1997 He was winner with his song Surat Untuk Kekasih at Malaysia Official Music Industry Award ( AIM ).
- 1996 The Best of Sound Track Album of the Movie at Malaysia Hapuslah Air Mata( wipe your tears )
- 1991 Win of six Categories at Jakarta Music Festival in Best Vidio, Clip, Sound track, Composition and Producer He sings Once There Was Love

== Filmography ==
- Matahari Hampir Terbenam (1971)
- Brandal–Brandal Metropolitan (1971)
- Lagu Untukmu (1973)
- Akhir Sebuah Impian (1973)
- Bawang Putih (1974)
- Jangan Biarkan Mereka Lapar (1974)
- Kasih Sayang (1974)
- Impian Perawan (1976)
- Perempuan Histeris (1976)
- Hapuslah Air Matamu (1976)
- Wajah Tiga Perempuan (1976)
- Sesuatu Yang Indah (1976)
- Istriku Sayang Istriku Malang (1977)
