= Anuar Zain =

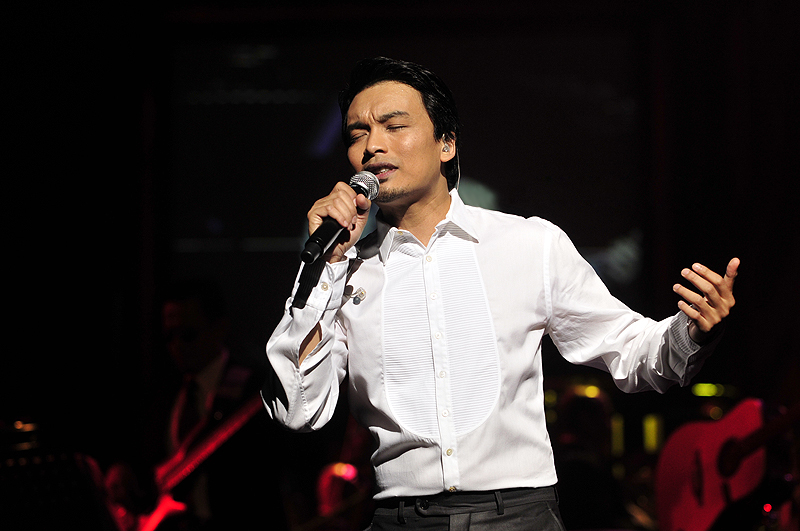
- Anuar performing the Lelaki Ini Concert in Istana Budaya, Kuala Lumpur
- Born: Shahrul Anuar bin Zain; 15 February 1970 (age 56); Merlimau, Melaka, Malaysia
- Occupations: Singer, actor
- Years active: 1985–present
- Parents: Zain Abdullah (father); Robiah Abdul (mother)
- Relatives: Ziana Zain (sister); Ernie Zakri (niece)
- Musical career
- Genres: Pop, Ballad, R&B
- Instrument: Vowel
- Label: Anuar Zain Network Sdn. Bhd.
- Associated Camelia, Dayang Nurfaizah, Hetty Sarlene, Amy Mastura
- Website: www.anuarzain.com.my

Shahrul Anuar Zain (born 15 February 1970) is a Malaysian singer and actor. He has had five albums released, all of which have been named after him. The first album was released in 1998, consisting of 10 songs. His first single after a hiatus was "Bila Resah". Subsequent albums were released in 2002, 2007, 2011 and 2016.

== Personal life ==
Born in Merlimau, Malacca, Anuar is the second child out of 5 siblings, one of them is his older sister, fellow artist Ziana Zain.

Anuar is not married and has no children, making him the only person among of his five siblings who is unmarried.

== Discography ==
To date, Anuar Zain has produced five studio albums which all of them bearing his name as an album title.

- Anuar Zain I (1998)
- Anuar Zain II (2002)
- Anuar Zain III (2007)
- Anuar Zain IV (2011)
- Anuar Zain V (2016)

In 2021, he came out with a new single titled "Sendiri" which then became an original soundtrack to the hit drama series, Single Terlalu Lama.

== Filmography ==
=== Film ===
Year	Title	Role	Notes
2000	Soal Hati	Roslan	Debut film appearances
2004	Bintang Hati	Izad	

=== Television series ===
Year	Title	Role	TV channel	Notes
2005	Puteri (Season 1)	Himself	TV3	Episode: "Penyanyi Pujaan"
