= Akademi Fantasia season 9 =

Akademi Fantasia
- Season 9
- Hosted by: Aznil Nawawi
- Judges: Fauziah Ahmad Daud; Hattan
- Winner: Hazama Ahmad Azmi
- Runner-up: Lenaber Hadir
- Finals venue: Putra Square

Release
- Original network: Astro Ria
- Original release: 2 April – 12 June 2011

Season chronology
- ← Previous; Season 8 Next → Season 10

The ninth season of Akademi Fantasia premiered on 2 April 2011 and concluded on 12 June 2011 on the Astro Ria television channel. Aznil Nawawi made a comeback as host along with Fauziah Ahmad Daud and Hattan also made a comeback to judge.

The professional trainers as well as twelve students of this season were revealed in a press conference which took place in ÆON malls in Malaysia. On 2 April 2011, Amy Search of Search was revealed to be the Principal for this season during Konsert Tirai Akademi Fantasia.

The season was originally planned to be the final season; however, the series would subsequently be revived in 2013.

On 12 June 2011, Hazama Ahmad Azmi was crowned the winner of the ninth season of Akademi Fantasia, beating Lenaber Hadir.

This season attracted the lowest reception of votes in the history of Akademi Fantasia, with 3.74 million votes cast.

== Format changes ==
Several new formats were also implemented in this season. For instance, the location for Diari Akademi Fantasia was disclosed which is at ÆON AU2, Setiawangsa. Students undergo their daily routine as a student of Akademi Fantasia in the second floor of the shopping complex for public viewing. This change is a departure from the previous eight seasons where the location for Diari Akademi Fantasia was not revealed.

=== Operasi Gugur ===
The second change in Akademi Fantasia format is the implementation of Operasi Gugur. In this format, students with the least improvement would be expelled by the professional trainers in order to give an opportunity for new students to join the academy. The announcement was made at the end of the second concert in Season 9 on 16 April 2011.

=== Immunity ===
Another change in Akademi Fantasia format is the introduction of an immunity system where the professional trainers would be given the power to exercise a veto on a student to spare him or her from elimination for that particular week. The immunity system, which consisted of 50% public voting from the audience and another 50% from a unanimous decision made by the professional trainers, was used in the eight concert of this season. The recipient of this system would advance automatically to the final concert without having to perform in the ninth concert. The new format change was revealed at the end of the sixth concert on 14 May 2011.

== Auditions ==
Auditions were held in the following cities:

- Promenade Hotel, Kota Kinabalu, Sabah - 28, 29 & 30 January
- National Stadium, Bukit Jalil, Kuala Lumpur – 11, 12 & 13 February

In addition to the above cities, for the first time contestants were allowed to audition via online. To audition, they were required to upload audition clip of them singing a pre-approved song in YouTube. Then, they were required to submit their application form together with their video link. The internet auditionees were called back in order to go through the second stage until the fourth stage of the audition. Contestants were required to be between the ages of 18 and 45, and are Malaysian and Singaporean citizens who are not embedded with recording or management contracts.

On 18 February 2011, forty semi-finalists were revealed as the candidates of Akademi Fantasia. Nevertheless, only twenty-five semi-finalists were selected to move on to the next round which was determined through public voting via online and based on professional jury. The online voting commenced on 18 February 2011, and ended on 8 March 2011. The twelve finalists who made it into the academy were revealed in a press conference which took place in ÆON AU2, Setiawangsa.

== Concert summaries ==
=== Tirai Concert ===
First Air Date: 2 April 2011

Student	Song (original artist)
Afif	"Entah" (Afgan) "Joget Angan Tak Sudah" (Jay Jay)
Aida	"Separuh Nafas" (Dewa) "Love the Way You Lie (Part II)" (Rihanna)
Amir	"Aku Skandal" (Hujan) "Seribu Tahun" (Imran Ajmain)
Azri	"Kopi Dangdut" (Fahmi Shahab) "Yang Pernah" (Estranged)
Eka	"Cindai" (Dato' Siti Nurhaliza) "Ku Tlah Jatuh Cinta" (Agnes Monica)
Erul	"I'll Be Back" (2PM) "Kasih Tercipta" (Faizal Tahir)
Kay	"Ku Berjanji Kerna Cinta" (Anuar Zain) "Kasih Latifah" (Spider)
Laika	"Tolong Ingatkan Aku" (Ana Raffali) "Nuri" (Ella)
Lena	"Lamunan Hati" (Wann) "Dag Dig Dug" (Haiza)
Miza	"I Am" (Mary J. Blige) "Hey Ladies" (Rossa)
Nera	"Bertakhta Di Hati" (Farahdhiya) "Waka Waka (This Time for Africa)" (Shakira)
Raqib	"Susun Silangkata" (Aizat) "Kaulah Segalanya" (Hazrul Nizam)

- Note: Amy Search was announced as the Principal of this season at the end of this concert.

=== Week 1 ===
First Air Date: 9 April 2011

Student	Song (original artist)	Result
Afif	"Cinta Kristal" (Rahim Maarof)	Safe
Aida	"Teringin" (Shima)	Safe
Amir	"Just the Way You Are" (Bruno Mars)	Safe
Azri	"Bukan Untuk Dimengerti" (Judika)	Safe
Eka	"Kau Bisu" (Alyah)	Bottom 3
Erul	"Ganas" (KRU)	Safe
Kay	"Menyesal" (6ixth Sense)	Bottom 3
Laika	"Ku Bahagia" (Melly Goeslaw)	Eliminated
Lena	"Lagu Untuk Kuala Lumpur" (Tom)	Safe
Miza	"Akhirnya Kini Pasti" (Anita Sarawak)	Safe
Nera	"Aku Lebih Tahu" (Mila)	Safe
Raqib	"Yank" (Wali Band)	Safe

- Guest judge: Adibah Noor

=== Week 2 ===
First Air Date: 16 April 2011

Student	Song (original artist)	Result
Afif	"One in a Million" (Ne-Yo)	Safe
Aida	"Ilusi" (Adira)	Safe
Amir	"Cinta Gila" (Dewa)	Bottom 3
Azri	"Bila Resah" (Anuar Zain)	Safe
Eka	"I'm Sorry Goodbye" (Krisdayanti)	Eliminated
Erul	"Cinta Untuk Nabila" (Melissa)	Safe
Kay	"Selagi Ada Rindu" (Kristal)	Safe
Lena	"Kekal" (Ziana Zain)	Safe
Miza	"Di Pintu Sepi" (Search)	Bottom 3
Nera	"Aku Dia dan Kamu" (D-Va)	Safe
Raqib	"Dan Bila Esok" (Sofaz)	Safe

- Guest judge: Fauziah Latiff

=== Week 3 ===
First Air Date: 23 April 2011

Student	Song (original artist)	Result
Afif	"Kasihnya Laila" (Jinbara)	Safe
Aida	"Terlalu Istimewa" (Adibah Noor)	Expelled
Amir	"Dilema" (D’Masiv)	Expelled
Azri	"Satu" (Dewa)	Bottom 2
Erul	"Awan Nano" (Hafiz)	Safe
Kay	"Salomé" (Chayanne)	Safe
Lena	"Tiada Tangis Lagi" (Ella)	Safe
Miza	"Sofea Jane" (Black)	Eliminated
Nera	"Fly Me to the Moon" (Michael Bublé)	Safe
Raqib	"Sebelum Cahaya" (Letto)	Safe

- Guest judge: Norman KRU
- Note: Amir and Aida were expelled from the academy through 'AFGUGUR' after being deemed as the two students with the least improvement. They are replaced by Fina and Hazama based on the consensus achieved by the professional trainers through 'AFSERAP' scheme.

=== Week 4 ===
First Air Date: 30 April 2011

Student	Song (original artist)	Result
Afif	"Shoft B'enaiya" (Hossam Habib)	Safe
Azri	"Sampai Syurga" (Faizal Tahir)	Bottom 3
Erul	"Wanita Seluruh Dunia" (Projek Pistol)	Safe
Fina	"All by Myself" (Eric Carmen)	Safe
Hazama	"Srikandi Cinta" (Bloodshed)	Safe
Kay	"Kata" (Hazami)	Bottom 3
Lena	"It Must Have Been Love" (Roxette)	Safe
Nera	"Diam Diam" (Tilu)	Safe
Raqib	"Menghitung Hari" (Krisdayanti)	Eliminated

- Guest judge: Rudy Imran

=== Week 5 ===
First Air Date: 7 May 2011

Student	Song (original artist)	Result
Afif	"Malam" (Search)	Eliminated
Azri	"Sungai Lui" (Aizat)	Safe
Erul	"Dance Little Sister" (Terence Trent D'Arby)	Safe
Fina	"Segalanya Pasti" (Aida Agil)	Safe
Hazama	"Noktah Cinta" (Hafiz)	Safe
Kay	"Pulanglah" (Awi Rafael)	Bottom 3
Lena	"Ku Menunggu" (Rossa)	Safe
Nera	"Gelora Jiwa" (Saloma)	Bottom 3

- Guest judge: Edrie Hashim

=== Week 6 ===
First Air Date: 14 May 2011

Student	Song (original artist)	Result
Azri	"Sampai Hati" (Spring)	Bottom 3
Erul	"Janji" (Akim)	Bottom 3
Fina	"Ku Ke Udara Lagi" (Francissca Peter)	Safe
Hazama	"Hey, Soul Sister" (Train)	Safe
Kay	"Stand By Me" (Ben E. King)	Eliminated
Lena	"Curiga" (Ning Baizura)	Safe
Nera	"Kantoi" (Zee Avi)	Safe

- Guest judge: Faizal Tahir
- Note: A new format known as the immunity system was introduced in this concert where the professional trainers would be given the power to exercise a veto on a student to spare him or her from elimination for that particular week.

=== Week 7 ===
First Air Date: 21 May 2011

Student	Song (original artist)	Result
All Students	"Kalau Berpacaran" (Ana Raffali, Suhaimi Mior, & Altimet)	N/A
Azri	"Mahligai Syahdu" (Hattan)	Bottom 3
Erul	"Antara Hujan dan Airmata" (Sudirman Arshad)	Bottom 3
Fina	"Purnama Merindu" (Dato' Siti Nurhaliza)	Safe
Hazama	"Segalanya Kuterima" (Ilusi)	Safe
Lena	"Cinta Sempurna" (Yuna)	Safe
Nera	"Tak Ingin Sendiri" (Hetty Koes Endang)	Eliminated

- Guest judge: AC Mizal
- Note: Following the introduction of the immunity system in the previous concert, it was announced that the immunity system would only be implemented in the upcoming concert. In addition, the public voting would contribute as much as 50% towards the selection of a particular student to be the recipient of the immunity system.

=== Week 8 ===
First Air Date: 28 May 2011

Student	Song (original artist)	Result
All Students	"Bawaku Terbang" (The Fabulous Cats) "I Gotta Feeling" (The Black Eyed Peas)	N/A
Azri	"Luar Biasa" (Shahir)	Bottom 3
Erul	"Bunga Angkasa" (Terra Rossa)	Bottom 3
Fina	"Samudera" (Nora)	Immune
Hazama	"Sendiri" (May)	Safe
Lena	"Kisah Hati" (Alyah)	Saved

- Guest judge: Sham Kamikaze
- Note: The choice of song for each student in this concert was determined by the audience. In addition, each student was given the opportunity to design the concept of their performance during the concert.

=== Week 9 ===
First Air Date: 4 June 2011

Student	Song (original artist)	Result
All Students	"Kalau Cinta" (Alif Aziz & Joanna) "Never Say Never" (Justin Bieber)	N/A
Azri	"Here Without You" (3 Doors Down)	Bottom 2
Erul	"Nadiku" (Sabhi Saddi)	Eliminated
Hazama	"Angin" (Dewa)	Safe
Lena	"Badarsila" (Dato' Siti Nurhaliza)	Safe

- Guest judge: Dato' Siti Nurhaliza

=== Week 10 ===
First Air Date: 12 June 2011

Student	Song (original artist)	Result
All Students	"Firework" (Katy Perry)	N/A
Azri	"Ku Tak Biasa" (Slank) "Niskala" (Azri)	Fourth
Fina	"Satu Harapan" (Jaclyn Victor) "Menangis Lagi" (Fina)	Third
Hazama	"Pukau" (Tomok) "Cinta Teragung" (Hazama)	Winner
Lena	"Dunia" (Bunkface) "Sisa Kisah Kita" (Lena)	Runner-up

- Guest judge: Dato' Ramli M.S.

== Students ==
(ages stated are at time of contest)

Student	Age	Hometown	Rank
Zulaikha "Laika" Zahari	22	Kuala Lumpur	14th
Nuratiqah “Eka” Shariffudin	21	Kuala Lumpur	13th
Roshammizah "Miza" Rosli	27	Kuala Lumpur	12th
Nur Suhada “Aida” Jebat	19	Malacca	11th
Mohamad Amirullah "Amir" Jahari	19	Kuching, Sarawak	10th
Fahrur Raqib Abdul Majid	21	Melaka	9th
Ahmad Aliff Afif Tirmizie	25	Pekan, Pahang	8th
Nur Khaidir Muhid	23	Sandakan, Sabah	7th
Queennera "Nera" Francine Francis Kitingon	19	Likas, Sabah	6th
Khairul “Erul” Najmuddin Abu Samah	20	Kuala Lumpur	5th
Mohamad Azri Abdullah	24	Klang, Selangor	4th
Nur Syafinaz "Fina" Jebat	18	Malacca	3rd
Lenaber "Lena" Hadir	21	Kota Kinabalu, Sabah	2nd
Hazama Ahmad Azmi	27	Perak	1st

== Summaries ==
=== Elimination chart ===
Voting Result in Rank Order
Order	Weekly Concert									
Order	1	2	3	4	5	6	7	8	9	10
1	Nera	Lena	Lena	Hazama	Hazama	Hazama	Hazama	Hazama	Hazama	Hazama
2	Erul	Erul	Erul	Fina	Fina	Fina	Fina	Fina	Lena	Lena
3	Aida	Nera	Nera	Lena	Lena	Lena	Lena	Azri	Azri	Fina
4	Raqib	Raqib	Amir	Erul	Azri	Nera	Erul	Erul	Erul	Azri
5	Lena	Aida	Afif	Nera	Erul	Erul	Azri	Lena		
6	Afif	Afif	Raqib	Afif	Nera	Azri	Nera			
7	Amir	Azri	Kay	Azri	Kay	Kay				
8	Azri	Kay	Aida	Kay	Afif					
9	Miza	Amir	Azri	Raqib						
10	Eka	Miza	Miza							
11	Kay	Eka	Fina							
12	Laika		Hazama							

The student won the competition
The student was the first runner-up
The student was the second runner-up
The student was the third runner-up
The student was the original eliminee but was saved
The student was eliminated
The student was immune from elimination
The students were expelled through Operasi Gugur or 'AFGUGUR'
The students were entered into the competition, replacing students who were expelled through 'AFSERAP'

- In Week 2, it was announced that students who do not show any improvement will be expelled from the academy and consequently be replaced with new students.
- In Week 3, following the announcement of Operasi Gugur, Aida and Amir are expelled from the competition after being deemed as the two students with the least improvement. Consequently, they are replaced by two new students, Fina and Hazama.
- In Week 8, Fina became the recipient of the Immunity system. As a result, she automatically advances to the finale without having to perform in the ninth concert.
- In Week 8, there was no elimination. The accumulated votes were forwarded to the following week.

== Cast members ==
=== Hosts ===
- Aznil Nawawi - Host of concert of Akademi Fantasia and Diari Akademi Fantasia

=== Professional trainers ===
- Amy Search - Principal
- Ning Baizura - Vocal Style
- Shafizawati Sharif - Vocal Technical
- Aris Kadir - Choreographer
- Fatimah Abu Bakar - English Language Consultant & Counsellor
- Adlin Aman Ramli - Drama & Performance

=== Judges ===
- Fauziah Ahmad Daud
- Hattan
