= Akademi Fantasia season 8 =

Akademi Fantasia
- Season 8
- Hosted by: Jimmy Shanley; Sarimah Ibrahim
- Judges: Adlin Aman Ramlie; Aznil Nawawi
- Winner: Ahmad Shahir Zawawi
- Runner-up: Siti Adira Suhaimi
- Finals venue: Putra Indoor Stadium

Release
- Original network: Astro Ria
- Original release: 13 March – 22 May 2010

Season chronology
- ← Previous; Season 7 Next → Season 9

The eighth season of Akademi Fantasia premiered on 13 March 2010 and continued until 22 May 2010 on the Astro Ria television channel. The show underwent a number of changes from the seventh season, including the return Adlin Aman Ramlie as judge while Aznil Nawawi joined the judging panel following the departures of Dato' Khadijah Ibrahim and Edry Hashim.

The professional trainers for this season were announced in a press conference for media which took place in Hilton Hotel, Kuala Lumpur on 8 February 2010. In the ceremony, Norman Abdul Halim was revealed to be the Principal for this season, while Sarimah Ibrahim and Jimmy Shanley were selected as the new hosts replacing AC Mizal.

The eighth season saw a new change to the format of the show. Instead of eliminating a student at the end of each concert, the elimination process was conducted in a new 30-minute segment called Debaran Akademi Fantasia, which was conducted by Sarimah Ibrahim.

The final concert was broadcast live in high definition technology, an Akademi Fantasia first, which was accessible for Astro B.yond subscribers in Channel 124 through Astro.

On 22 May 2010, Ahmad Shahir Zawawi from Kampar, Perak was announced the winner of the eighth season of Akademi Fantasia, defeating Siti Adira Suhaimi. He made history for being the first student to win the title after being re-entered into the competition through AFMASUK following his elimination in Week 7.

As many as 3.75 million votes were cast the entire season.

== Auditions ==
Auditions were held in the following cities:

- National Stadium, Bukit Jalil, Kuala Lumpur - 9 & 10 January
- The Zon, Johor Bahru, Johor - 16 & 17 January
- Redbox Gurney, Plaza Gurney, Penang - 16 & 17 January
- Promenade Hotel, Kota Kinabalu, Sabah - 22, 23 & 24 January
- Merdeka Palace Hotel, Kuching, Sarawak - 23 & 24 January
- National Stadium, Bukit Jalil, Kuala Lumpur - 30 & 31 January

=== List of songs during auditions ===
Songs for female

- "Gagap" – Stacy
- "Jika Kau Ubah Fikiran" - Mila
- "Tak Mungkin Kerna Sayang" - Alyah
- "Dan Sebenarnya" - Yuna
- "Di Taman Teman" - Datuk Siti Nurhaliza
- "When You're Gone" - Avril Lavigne

Songs for male

- "Situasi" – Bunkface
- "Hujan" – Sudirman Arshad
- "Ada Untukmu" – Nubhan
- "Berdendang Dalam Tangisan" – Jamal Abdillah
- "Fikirlah" – Aizat
- "I'm Yours" - Jason Mraz

Contestants were required to be between the ages of 18 and 45, and are Malaysian and Singaporean citizens who are not embedded with recording or management contracts.

== Concert summaries ==
=== Tirai Concert ===
Original Airdate: 13 March 2010

Student	Song
Adira	"Gagap" (Stacy)
Ain	"The Climb" (Miley Cyrus)
Alif	"Live Like We're Dying" (Kris Allen)
Anum	"Pelesit Kota" (Search)
Daus	"Bye Bye Bye" (N Sync)
Ema	"Tiada Lagi Tangisan" (Misha Omar / Aishah)
Farina	"Tiada Lagi" (Mayang Sari)
Iwan	"Coba" (Faizal Tahir)
Maulana	"Tekad" (Hazami)
Nad	"Gantung" (Melly Goeslaw)
Shah	"Drama King" (Meet Uncle Hussein)
Shahir	"Andalusia" (M. Nasir)

=== Week 1 ===
Original Airdate: 20 March 2010

Student	Song	Result
Adira	"Bertamu Di Kalbu" (Jaclyn Victor)	Safe
Ain	"Hey Ladies" (Rossa)	Safe
Alif	"Kau Aku" (Aizat)	Bottom 3
Anum	"Aku Tak Percaya Cinta" (Liyana Jasmay)	Safe
Daus	"Cari Jodoh" (Wali Band)	Safe
Ema	"Yang Terbaik" (Marsha)	Safe
Farina	"Paparazzi" (Lady Gaga)	Safe
Iwan	"Haven't Met You Yet" (Michael Bublé)	Safe
Maulana	"Extravaganza" (Bunkface)	Bottom 3
Nad	"ERT" (Farah Asyikin)	Safe
Shah	"Bengang" (Akim)	Eliminated
Shahir	"Khatimah Cinta" (6ixth Sense)	Safe

=== Week 2 ===
Original Airdate: 27 March 2010

Student	Song	Result
Adira	"Ku Percaya Ada Cinta" (Datuk Siti Nurhaliza)	Safe
Ain	"Happy" (Amy Mastura)	Bottom 3
Alif	"Dance with My Father" (Luther Vandross)	Safe
Anum	"Sekadar Di Pinggiran" (Francissca Peter)	Safe
Daus	"Menatap Matamu" (Aril AF7)	Safe
Ema	"Pakai Buang" (Stacy)	Eliminated
Farina	"Ketentuan" (Ramlah Ram)	Safe
Iwan	"Mencari Konklusi" (Hujan)	Safe
Maulana	"Hasrat Hati" (S. Mariam)	Bottom 3
Nad	"Aku Wanita Biasa" (Krisdayanti)	Safe
Shahir	"Jangan Nakal" (Aliff Satar)	Safe

=== Week 3 ===
Original Airdate: 3 April 2010

Student	Song	Result
Adira	"Kini" (Feminin)	Safe
Ain	"Cinta Antara Benua" (Arni Nazira)	Safe
Alif	"Sesuatu Janji" (Taufik Batisah)	Safe
Anum	"Kau Atau Aku" (Elyana)	Eliminated
Daus	"Separuh Jiwaku Pergi" (Anang)	Bottom 3
Farina	"Cantik" (Nikki)	Bottom 3
Iwan	"Permaisuriku" (Jay Jay)	Safe
Maulana	"So Sick" (Ne-Yo)	Safe
Nad	"Bulan Cinta" (Eva)	Safe
Shahir	"Derita Cinta" (Jamal Abdillah)	Safe

=== Week 4 ===
Original Airdate: 10 April 2010

Student	Song	Result
Adira	"Biarlah" (Nidji)	Safe
Ain	"Kawan" (Ruhil Amani)	Safe
Alif	"Hanya Di Radio" (Headwind)	Eliminated
Daus	"Mirage" (Pesawat)	Safe
Farina	"Teruskanlah" (Agnes Monica)	Bottom 3
Iwan	"Kekasih Gelapku" (Ungu)	Bottom 3
Maulana	"Biarkan" (Vince)	Safe
Nad	"Realiti Dewi" (Alyah)	Safe
Shahir	"Always Be My Baby" (David Cook)	Safe

=== Week 5 ===
Original Airdate: 17 April 2010

Student	Song	Result
Adira	"Seri Mersing" (Sharifah Aini)	Safe
Ain	"Halo" (Beyoncé Knowles)	Bottom 3
Daus	"Benar-Benar" (Adam)	Safe
Farina	"Mana Mungkin" (Dayang Nurfaizah)	Saved
Iwan	"Oh Juwita" (Nubhan)	Safe
Maulana	"Ku Bukan Aku" (Tilu)	Safe
Nad	"My Happy Ending" (Avril Lavigne)	Bottom 3
Shahir	"Anggapan Mu" (Ziana Zain)	Safe

=== Week 6 ===
Original Airdate: 24 April 2010

Student	Song	Result
Adira	"My All" (Mariah Carey)	Safe
Ain	"Jujur Takkan Melupakanmu" (Ella)	Bottom 3
Daus	"Selamat Malam" (Faizal Tahir)	Safe
Farina	"Teruskanlah" (Agnes Monica)	Bottom 3
Iwan	"Aku Cinta Kau Dan Dia" (Dewa)	Safe
Maulana	"Bila Rindu" (Ruffedge)	Safe
Nad	"Jikalau Aku" (Ezlynn)	Eliminated
Shahir	"Kau Yang Satu" (Ramli Sarip)	Safe

=== Week 7 ===
Original Airdate: 1 May 2010

Student	Song	Result
Adira	"Ayat-Ayat Cinta" (Rossa)	Safe
Ain	"Seindah Biasa" (Datuk Siti Nurhaliza)	Safe
Daus	"New Divide" (Linkin Park)	Safe
Farina	"Jika Kau Ubah Fikiran" (Mila)	Bottom 3
Iwan	"Warisan Wanita Terakhir" (Teacher's Pet)	Safe
Maulana	"Semalam" (Sean Ghazi)	Bottom 3
Shahir	"Tiara" (Kris)	Eliminated

=== Week 8 ===
Original Airdate: 8 May 2010

Student	Song	Result
Adira	"Kitalah Bintang" (Ella)	Safe
Ain	"Suci Dalam Debu" (Iklim)	Bottom 3
Daus	"Puspa" (ST12)	safe
Farina	"Selanjur Bercinta" (Aishah)	Eliminated
Iwan	"Lihat Cara Dia Memandangku" (Bre)	Bottom 3
Maulana	"Dalam Gerimis" (Visa)	Safe

=== Week 9 ===
Original Airdate: 15 May 2010

Student	Song	Result
Adira	"Mercy" (Duffy) "Dua" (KRU)	Safe
Ain	"Luka Dilukai" (Shima) "Fallin' for You" (Colbie Caillat)	Eliminated
Daus	"Masa" (Estranged) "Take a Look Around" (Limp Bizkit)	Safe
Iwan	"21 Guns" (Green Day) "Berlari" (Tomok)	Bottom 3
Maulana	"Better Man" (Robbie Williams) "Inilah Cinta" (Akim)	Bottom 3
Shahir	"Tak Mungkin Berpaling" (Mawi) "Tamally Maak" (Amr Diab)	Safe

=== Week 10 ===
Original Airdate: 22 May 2010

Student	Song	Result
Adira	"Tiru Macam Saya" (Sheila Majid) "Ku Ada Kamu" (Adira)	Runner-up
Daus	"Doktor Pakar Cinta" (Yusry) "Kenapa" (Daus)	Third
Iwan	"Relaku Pujuk" (Spider) "V.I.P." (Iwan)	Fifth
Maulana	"Susun Silang Kata" (Aizat) "RSVP" (Maulana)	Fourth
Shahir	"Biru Mata Hitamku" (Wings) "Kebahagiaan Dalam Perpisahan" (Shahir)	Winner

== Students ==
(ages stated are at time of contest)

Student	Age	Hometown	Rank
Muhammed Shahril Mohd Saleh Hussein	26	Klang, Selangor	12th
Erma Suhaimi	21	Ranau, Sabah	11th
Dayang Nor Anum Arjuna Aharun	18	Tawau, Sabah	10th
Muhammad Alif Kadim	18	Kuala Lumpur	9th
Nadia Emilia Roselan	21	Klang, Selangor	8th
Zafarina Jamhari	28	Bintulu, Sarawak	7th
Nadiawati Ainul Basir	23	Sandakan, Sabah	6th
Emirza Azwan "Iwan" Zulazrin Chew	20	Seremban, Negeri Sembilan	5th
Muhd Firdaus Maulana Mohamed	22	Johor Bahru, Johor	4th
Muhd Shahril Firdaus Eli	22	Kuching, Sarawak	3rd
Siti Adira Suhaimi	19	Ranau, Sabah	Runner-up
Ahmad Shahir Zawawi	21	Kampar, Perak	Winner

== Summaries ==
=== Elimination chart ===
Voting Result in Rank Order
Order	Weekly Concerts									
Order	1	2	3	4	5	6	7	8	9	10
1	Anum	Iwan	Adira	Adira	Daus	Adira	Adira	Adira	Shahir	Shahir
2	Ain	Alif	Maulana	Shahir	Maulana	Iwan	Daus	Daus	Adira	Adira
3	Shahir	Daus	Shahir	Maulana	Shahir	Daus	Iwan	Maulana	Daus	Daus
4	Iwan	Adira	Alif	Daus	Adira	Shahir	Ain	Ain	Iwan	Maulana
5	Adira	Shahir	Ain	Ain	Iwan	Maulana	Maulana	Iwan	Maulana	Iwan
6	Ema	Nad	Nad	Nad	Nad	Ain	Farina	Farina	Ain	
7	Farina	Farina	Iwan	Iwan	Ain	Farina	Shahir	Shahir		
8	Nad	Anum	Farina	Farina	Farina	Nad				
9	Daus	Maulana	Daus	Alif						
10	Maulana	Ain	Anum							
11	Alif	Ema								
12	Shah									

The student won the competition
The student was the runner-up
The student was the second runner-up
The students were finalists
The student was the original eliminee but was saved
The student was re-entered into the competition through AFMASUK
The student was eliminated

- In week 5, there was no elimination. The accumulated votes were forwarded to the following week.
- In week 8, Shahir was re-entered into the competition after scoring the highest votes through AFMASUK.

== Cast members ==
=== Hosts ===
- Jimmy Shanley - Host of concert of Akademi Fantasia and Diari Akademi Fantasia
- Sarimah Ibrahim - Host of concert of Akademi Fantasia and Debaran Akademi Fantasia

=== Professional trainers ===
- Norman Abdul Halim - Principal
- Adnan Abu Hassan - Vocal Technical
- Siti Hajar Ismail - Vocal Presentation
- Linda Jasmine - Choreographer
- Fatimah Abu Bakar - English Language Consultant & Counsellor
- Que Haidar - Drama & Acting

=== Judges ===
- Adlin Aman Ramlie
- Aznil Nawawi

== Season statistics ==
- Total number of students: 12
- Oldest student: Zafarina Jamhari, 28 years old
- Youngest students: Dayang Nor Anum Arjuna Aharun & Muhammad Alif Kadim, both 18 years old
- Tallest student: Muhd Firdaus Maulana Mohamed, 5'6.7" (173 cm)
- Shortest student: Siti Adira Suhaimi, 4'9" (152 cm)
- Heaviest student: Muhammed Shahril Mohd Saleh Hussein, 176 lbs (80 kg)
- Lightest student: Nadia Emilia Roselan, 94 lb (43 kg)
- Student with the most collective highest votes: Siti Adira Suhaimi, 5 times
- Student with the most consecutive highest votes: Siti Adira Suhaimi, 3 times
- Top 3's vote mean (excluding finale): Ahmad Shahir Zawawi – 3.5, Siti Adira Suhaimi - 2.22, Muhd Shahril Firdaus Eli - 4.0,
- Top 3's vote median (excluding finale): Ahmad Shahir Zawawi – 3, Siti Adira Suhaimi - 1, Muhd Shahril Firdaus Eli - 3
- Student with the most collective bottom two appearances: Zafarina Jamhari, 5 times
- Student with the most consecutive bottom two appearances: Zafarina Jamhari, 5 times
- Student with no bottom two appearances: Siti Adira Suhaimi
