= Harapan =

Harapan may refer to:

- Harapan Rainforest, lowland tropical forests in Sumatra, Indonesia
- Harapan, Philippine TV series List of programs aired by ABS-CBN 23rd PMPC Star Awards for Television
- Harapan, Pakatan Harapan ("Hope Pact") Malaysian political coalition
- Harapan (album) ("Hope") by Malaysian singer Francissca Peter released in 1988
- Harapan (rhino), the last Sumatran rhino in North America

== See also ==
- Harappan (disambiguation)
