= Adira (disambiguation) =

Adira is a Malaysian singer.

Adira may also refer to:

- Adira (beetle), a beetle genus of South and Central America
- Adira, a character in Rapunzel's Tangled Adventure
- Adira Tal, a character in Star Trek: Discovery
- Adheera, a character in the 2022 Indian film KGF: Chapter 2
