= Komputer Muzik =

Studio album by Francissca Peter
- Released: 1984
- Genre: Pop, Dance, Jazz
- Length: 34:16
- Language: Malay
- Label: Warner Music Malaysia
- Producer: Spectrum

Francissca Peter chronology
Siapa Dia Sebelum Daku (1984)	Komputer Muzik (1984)	Aku Hanya Pendatang (1985)

Komputer Muzik is the debut studio album from Malaysian singer Francissca Peter released in 1984. In September 2010, Warner Music Malaysia re-issued the CD due to popular demand.

== Track listing ==
No.	Title	Writer(s)	Length
1.	"Ku Menari Untukmu"	Micheal Veerapen, Francissca Peter	4:38
2.	"Dia"	Micheal Veerapen, Habsah Hassan	3:14
3.	"Si Mata Merah"	Joseph Thomas, Habsah Hassan	3:08
4.	"Bisikan Kasih"	William De Cruz, Zeid Ismail	3:26
5.	"Malam Sunyi"	David Ye Ah Kian, Habsah Hassan	3:51
6.	"Komputer Muzik"	Micheal Veerapen, Rafique Rashid	2:32
7.	"Keyakinan Diri"	Micheal Veerapen, Habsah Hassan	4:01
8.	"Rahsia Hatiku"	David Ye Ah Kian, Francissca Peter	3:39
9.	"Oh Cahaya"	Joseph Thomas, Azmil Mustapha	3:54
10.	"Kejadian Ini"	Micheal Veerapen, Habsah Hassan	3:53
Total length:			34:16

== Credits and personnel ==
Credits adapted from Komputer Muzik booklet liner notes.

- Arrangements by Spectrum, William De Cruz
- Recorded by – Wong Chee Seong

== Personnel ==
- Keyboards – Micheal Veerapen
- Drums – Maniam, Louis Pragasam (track 7)
- Bass – David Yee
- Guitars – Joseph Thomas
- Tenor Sax, Flute – Salvado A Gurzo
- Oberheim DMX was used on tracks 3, 4, 5, 6, and 8
