= Inspirasi =

2015 song performed by Hafiz

Song by Hafiz Suip and Faizal Tahir
- Released: 25 August 2015
- Recorded: July 2015
- Genre: Pop
- Length: 3:21
- Label: Era FM
- Songwriter(s): Faizal Tahir, Mike Chan

"Inspirasi" (Inspiration) is a duet sung by Malaysian artists, Hafiz Suip and Faizal Tahir, released on 25 August 2015. The song is a special project between Era FM and Raku, a music streaming service under Astro. It was composed specifically as a tribute to Siti Nurhaliza for her achievements in the Malaysian music industry for more than 20 years. Co-written by Faizal Tahir, the song is only available for listening on Era FM and Raku.

Although the song serves as a tribute to Siti, she performed the song herself at Anugerah MeleTOP Era 2016 on 28 February 2016.

== Background and recording ==
"This song that is entitled 'Inspirasi', is actually a song that is giving the full appreciation feeling to get an inspiration in grasping an achievement. Dedicated especially to Dato' Siti Nurhaliza, who has never stops fighting in her career as an entertainer ."

—Rithan, Content Manager of Raku commenting about the song" (Note: Original:"Lagu yang berjudul ‘Inspirasi’ ini merupakan sebuah lagu yang memberikan sepenuh penghayatan untuk mendapatkan ilham dalam menggapai sesebuah kejayaan. Didedikasikan khas buat Dato’ Siti Nurhaliza, yang tidak pernah berhenti perjuangannya dalam kerjaya sebagai anak seni.")

The song began as a special project by Era FM and Raku who were looking for ways to celebrate Siti Nurhaliza's 20th year in the music industry. After much deliberation, Era FM and Raku's content managers, Nazri Noran and Rithan decided that they should celebrate the occasion by giving Siti a special tribute song.

According to Nazri, while they were looking for music composers, Faizal Tahir eagerly volunteered to compose the music and the lyrics himself. He messaged Nazri at 3 a.m when he heard that Nazri is looking for music composers to write a tribute song. Nazri agreed to Faizal's request and he asked him to provide a demo in which Faizal composed both lyrics and music for "Inspirasi" in a matter of hours. Upon hearing the demo, Nazri decided that they will use Faizal's composition as the tribute since "Faizal really had Siti in his mind when he made the song. And it came from [his] heart." (Note: Original:"Faizal memang fikirkan Siti semasa buat lagu ni. Dan ianya memang sesuatu yang lahir dari hati.")

In the final version of the song, Mike Chan helped to compose the song and they invited Hafiz Suip to provide the main vocals with Faizal provided the featuring vocals himself. According to Era FM, to have Hafiz singing the song is the perfect choice since "Hafiz and Faizal Tahir really want to do something for someone who they have taken as an example in the entertainment industry." (Note: Original:"[...] Hafiz dan Faizal Tahir memang ingin melakukan sesuatu untuk seseorang yang mereka jadikan contoh dalam industri hiburan.")

== Composition and lyrics ==
At three minutes and twenty one seconds long, "Inspirasi" is a pop song that is specially attributed to Siti Nurhaliza. Its original demo and lyrics were composed and written by Faizal Tahir, while in the final version, Mike Chan helped as a co-music writer. Faizal composed both music and its lyrics in only a few hours after Nazri Noran, Era FM's content manager asked him to provide a demo.

The main vocals for the song were provided by Hafiz Suip while Faizal provided the featuring vocals.

== Release and promotion ==
On 21 August 2015, Siti Nurhaliza was invited to Era FM to join their morning program, JoHaRa Pagi ERA. She was invited as a special guest by Era FM who would like to congratulate her as the artist with a song that is most played on Era FM. During her 4-hour stint on the program, she also acted as a temporary radio deejay and news presenter. Throughout the program, only her songs were played, where select songs from her debut album until the latest were played on air. Prior to the reveal, she was handed a "fan letter" containing the lyrics to the song under a pretense it was a poem. Thinking it was a poem, she casually asked one of the deejays to read the letter to her. It was finally revealed to her when he started to preview the song for the first time to her. She jokingly commented, "I love the song and [I] am touched. Listening to the melody and its lyrics, I want to sing the song, but it cannot be done since it is composed specially for me. It will sound weird if I were to sing it." (Note: Original:"Saya suka lagu ini dan berasa sangat terharu. Mendengar melodi dan liriknya, saya teringin menyanyikan lagu ini, tetapi tak boleh kerana ia dibuat khusus untuk saya. Macam tak kena pula kalau saya nyanyi.") The song finally aired in full on Era FM on 25 August 2015. The song is also available exclusively for streaming via Raku.

On 28 February 2016, Siti sang the song herself while being accompanied by contestants from Ceria Popstar for Anugerah MeleTOP Era 2016.
