= Izwan =

Izwan is a Malaysian name. Notable people with this name include:

- Fairul Izwan Abd Muin (born 1982), Malaysian lawn bowler
- Hasli Izwan (born 1977), Malaysian sport shooter
- Izwan Mahbud (born 1990), Singaporean football player
- Izwan Pilus (1979-2012), Malaysian singer and television host
- Mohd Amirul Izwan Yaacob (born 1986), Malaysian football referee
