= Aku Hanya Pendatang =

Studio album by Francissca Peter
- Released: 1985
- Genre: Pop, dance
- Length: 33:56
- Language: Malay
- Label: Warner Music Malaysia
- Producer: Manan Ngah (WEA Malaysia)

Francissca Peter chronology
Komputer Muzik (1984)	Aku Hanya Pendatang (1985)	Sekadar Di Pinggiran (1986)

Aku Hanya Pendatang is the second studio album from Malaysian singer Francissca Peter released in 1985.

== Track listing ==
No.	Title	Writer(s)	Length
1.	"Nasib Si Kembang Pagi"	Manan Ngah, S. Amin Shahab	3:24
2.	"Andainya"	Manan Ngah, S. Amin Shahab	3:16
3.	"Dunia Ini Cepat"	Surya Booty & Roslan Aziz, S. Amin Shahab	3:44
4.	"Masih Belum Tamat"	Manan Ngah, S. Amin Shahab	3:01
5.	"Cinta Kasih Desa"	Kenny Tay, Saodah Ismail	3:04
6.	"Semangat Cinta Lama"	Kenny Tay, S. Amin Shahab	2:57
7.	"Teka-Teki Cinta"	Manan Ngah, S. Amin Shahab	2:37
8.	"Permata"	Jenny Chin, Saodah Ismail	4:44
9.	"Harapan Dalam Penantian"	Kesuma Booty, Isma Alif	3:38
10.	"Aku Hanya Pendatang"	Manan Ngah, Habsah Hassan	4:01
Total length:			33:56

== Awards and recognitions ==
- Released by Warner Music Malaysia, the album reached a Gold certification.

== Credits and personnel ==
Credits adapted from Aku Hanya Pendatang booklet liner notes.

- Music arrangement – Manan Ngah, Adnan Abu Hassan, Jenny Chin, Kesuma & Surya Booty
- Recorded by – Roslan, Jude Lim & Lan
- Back-up Vocals – Manan Ngah
- Additional percussions
  - Arumugam
  - Zahid
- Photography – Kenny Loh
  - Shooting location – The Regent of Kuala Lumpur
- Artist management – Mike Bernie's Entertainment Company Sdn Bhd
