= Francissca Peter & Friends – The Love & Hope Album =

Studio album by Francissca Peter
- Released: 2012
- Genre: Pop
- Label: Independent
- Producer: Bibiana Peter

Francissca Peter chronology
Masih Merindu (2003)	Francissca Peter & Friends – The Love & Hope Album (2012)

Francissca Peter & Friends – The Love & Hope Album is a full studio album from Malaysian award-winning singer and songwriter Francissca Peter, released in 2012.

== Background ==
- Francissca Peter & Friends: The Love & Hope Album is produced in collaboration with Petaling Jaya-based Christian humanitarian organisation World Vision Malaysia Bhd (WVM) and launched in conjunction with World Vision's Gift of Hope (GOH) Catalogue, an alternative gift catalogue put together by WVM to help those in need.
- The 12-track album includes songs in Tamil, Mandarin and Temuan (local indigenous language) and features seven solos by Peter and duets with local singers Juwita Suwito, Daniel Lee, Daniel Louis, indigenous singers Ramlan Koyok, Haing Alin and Rudy Malam, and narratives by TV host William Lee and model/beauty queen Deborah Henry.
- Label and executive producer: World Vision Malaysia
- Producers: Francissca Peter, Steve Leong and Bibiana Peter

== Track listing ==
Label & Executive Producer	Producers	Arrangers	
World Vision Malaysia	Francissca Peter, Steve Leong and Bibiana Peter	Francissca Peter, Bibiana Peter and Steve Leong	
Track	Title	Composer and Lyricist	Length
1	"带领我 (He Leads Me) (featuring Daniel Lee)"	Andrew Lau	3:59
2	"Silver and Gold (featuring Juwita Suwito)"	Johnny Marks	3:58
3	"Parathilulla Engal Pithave (Our Father In Heaven) (featuring Daniel Louis)"	Premji Ebenezer	4:16
4	"Gimbak Kitak Manak (Where Are our Jungles?) (featuring Ramlan Koyok, Haing Alin & Rudy Malam)"	Ramlan Koyok & Haing Alin	5:24
5	"Bridge Over Troubled Water"	Paul Simon	4:37
6	"Silent Night"	Jose Mohr, John F Young & Anonymous	4:12
7	"Pie Jesu/Ave Maria"	Thomas of Chelano / Franz Schubert	4:07
8	"It Starts With Me (World Vision Malaysia 15thAnniversary Theme Song) "	Francissca Peter, Bibiana Peter, Leonard Yeap & David Kien Lim	4:17
9	"Somewhere"	Stephen Sondheim	4:21
10	"What the World Needs Now Is Love"	Hal David & Burt F. Bacharach	4:00
11	"Happy Birthday Jesus"	James P. & Teddy Gentry	3:41
12	"The Greatest Love Story"	Mei K Kuan & Bibiana Peter	2:00
