= Harappan =

Harappan may refer to:

- Aspects related to Harappa, an archaeological site (c. 3300–1600 BC) and city in Punjab in northeast Pakistan
- The Indus Valley civilisation or Harappan civilisation, a Bronze Age civilisation that throve along Indus River c. 3300 – c. 1700 BC
  - Harappan architecture of the ancient Indus Valley civilisation of Harappa
  - Harappan language, the language spoken by the Indus Valley civilisation
  - Harappan script, the writing system used by the Indus Valley civilisation

== See also ==
- Harapan (disambiguation)
