= Adira inexculta =

Scientific classification
- Kingdom: Animalia
- Phylum: Arthropoda
- Class: Insecta
- Order: Coleoptera
- Suborder: Polyphaga
- Infraorder: Cucujiformia
- Family: Coccinellidae
- Genus: Adira
- Species: A. inexculta

Binomial name
- Adira inexculta (Gordon, 1975)

Synonyms
- Dira inexculta Gordon, 1975

Species of beetle

Adira inexculta is a species of beetle of the family Coccinellidae. It is found in Bolivia.

== Description ==
Adults reach a length of about 6.97 mm. Adults are black. The lateral margin of the pronotum is yellow and the elytron is brownish red with a black lateral border.
