= Adira gossypiata =

Scientific classification
- Kingdom: Animalia
- Phylum: Arthropoda
- Class: Insecta
- Order: Coleoptera
- Suborder: Polyphaga
- Infraorder: Cucujiformia
- Family: Coccinellidae
- Genus: Adira
- Species: A. gossypiata

Binomial name
- Adira gossypiata (Mulsant, 1850)

Synonyms
- Epilachna gossypiata Mulsant, 1850

Species of beetle

Adira gossypiata is a species of beetle of the family Coccinellidae. It is found in Bolivia.

== Description ==
Adults reach a length of about 5.63–6.77 mm. Adults are brownish yellow. The median area of the pronotum is reddish brown and the elytron is reddish brown with a yellow lateral margin. There is a piceous ring inside the yellow margin.
