= Pasti Kembali =

Studio album by Francissca Peter
- Released: 1989
- Genre: Pop
- Label: Warner Music

Pasti Kembali is the sixth studio album from Malaysian singer Francissca Peter released in 1989.

== Awards and recognitions ==
- The album released by Warner Music Malaysia achieves Platinum status.

== Track listing ==
Track	Title	Composer and Lyricist	Length
1	"Pasti Kembali"	J. Jay / Seri Bayu	3:52
2	"Rindu Memaksaku Menyayangimu"	Ahmad Nawab / Juwie	4:03
3	"Kekasih"	Azman Abu Hassan / Johan Nawawi	3:44
4	"Sepanjang Jalan Kenangan"	Mac Chew / S. Amin Shahab Music Works Sdn Bhd	4:54
5	"Sebahagian Usia Ini"	A Ali / Azman Abu Hassan	4:01
6	"Rindu Seorang Kekasih"	Ahmad Nawab / Juwie & Owie	3:35
7	"Pertemuan Semalam"	Yan S	4:19
8	"Tidak Seindah Pengakuan"	WOM / Seri Bayu	4:10
9	"Kepadamu"	Steven J / Seri Bayu	4:10
10	"Kekasih Hadhirlah"	WOM / Habsah Hassan	4:17
