= Adira gossypioides =

Scientific classification
- Kingdom: Animalia
- Phylum: Arthropoda
- Class: Insecta
- Order: Coleoptera
- Suborder: Polyphaga
- Infraorder: Cucujiformia
- Family: Coccinellidae
- Genus: Adira
- Species: A. gossypioides

Binomial name
- Adira gossypioides (Gordon, 1975)

Synonyms
- Dira gossypioides Gordon, 1975

Species of beetle

Adira gossypioides is a species of beetle of the family Coccinellidae. It is found in Panama and Colombia.

== Description ==
Adults reach a length of about 5.63–5.71 mm. Adults are yellow. The pronotum is yellow with a brownish black median area at the base. The elytron is brownish black with a yellow lateral border.
