= Adira clarkii =

Scientific classification
- Kingdom: Animalia
- Phylum: Arthropoda
- Class: Insecta
- Order: Coleoptera
- Suborder: Polyphaga
- Infraorder: Cucujiformia
- Family: Coccinellidae
- Genus: Adira
- Species: A. clarkii

Binomial name
- Adira clarkii (Crotch, 1874)

Synonyms
- Epilachna clarkii Crotch, 1874

Species of beetle

Adira clarkii is a species of beetle of the family Coccinellidae. It is found in Brazil.

== Description ==
Adults reach a length of about 5.61–6.36 mm. Adults are black. The anterior and lateral margins of the pronotum are yellow and the elytron has a yellow border, with a piceous to black border inside this yellow border. The median area of the elytron is brownish yellow.
