= Adira subcincta =

Scientific classification
- Kingdom: Animalia
- Phylum: Arthropoda
- Class: Insecta
- Order: Coleoptera
- Suborder: Polyphaga
- Infraorder: Cucujiformia
- Family: Coccinellidae
- Genus: Adira
- Species: A. subcincta

Binomial name
- Adira subcincta (Mulsant, 1850)

Synonyms
- Epilachna subcincta Mulsant, 1850

Species of beetle

Adira subcincta is a species of beetle of the family Coccinellidae. It is found in Colombia.

== Description ==
Adults reach a length of about 5.47 mm. Adults are yellow. The head, pronotum and legs are pale reddish brown and the elytron is reddish brown with a paler lateral margin.
