= Kau Bintangku =

Studio album by Francissca Peter
- Released: 1987
- Genre: Pop
- Label: Warner Music

Kau Bintangku is the fourth studio album from Malaysian singer Francissca Peter released in 1987.

== Controversy ==
- The album was almost banned as the cover featured Francissca Peter wearing a crucifix, which stirred controversy among certain groups in Malaysia. This backlash was instigated by a small group of individuals who objected to a non-Malay artist gaining significant popularity among Malay-Muslim fans. They argued that the imagery was inappropriate and tried to get the album banned.

In response, Warner Music acted swiftly, digitally altering the album cover to remove the crucifix while preserving the integrity of the album's design. The revised album cover was re-released, and instead of diminishing its appeal, the controversy generated significant publicity.

The heightened attention contributed to the album's widespread success, and Kau Bintangku went on to achieve Platinum status, cementing Francissca Peter's position as one of Malaysia's leading pop artists. The album’s resilience in overcoming these challenges remains a testament to her enduring popularity and the public’s appreciation of her music.

== Track listing ==
Track	Title	Composer and Lyricist	Length
1	"Kau Bintangku"	Manan Ngah / Habsah Hassan	3:32
2	"Oolalla Tropika"	Manan Ngah / S. Amin Shahab	4:30
3	"Kau Lilin Cintaku"	Manan Ngah / Seri Bayu	4:30
4	"Shuba Dadu Baa"	Manan Ngah / Manan Ngah	4:19
5	"Cintamu Duri Di Hati"	Manan Ngah / Habsah Hassan	3:09
6	"Digenggam Sepi"	Manan Ngah / Mazemie Maz	3:32
7	"Di Mana Lagi"	Ramli Sarip / Manan Ngah & Seri Bayu	4:21
8	"Aku Kembali Lagi"	Manan Ngah / Manan Ngah & Seri Bayu	3:12
9	"Mencari Kesempatan"	Ramli Sarip / Seri Bayu	3:25
10	"Kerna Terpaksa"	Manan Ngah / Juwie	4:41
