= Adira nucula =

Scientific classification
- Kingdom: Animalia
- Phylum: Arthropoda
- Class: Insecta
- Order: Coleoptera
- Suborder: Polyphaga
- Infraorder: Cucujiformia
- Family: Coccinellidae
- Genus: Adira
- Species: A. nucula

Binomial name
- Adira nucula (Weise, 1902)

Synonyms
- Solanophila nucula Weise, 1902

Species of beetle

Adira nucula is a species of beetle of the family Coccinellidae. It is found in Peru.

== Description ==
Adults reach a length of about 6.28–6.78 mm. Adults are black. The anterolateral angle of the pronotum is yellow and the elytron is brownish red with a black lateral border.
