= Adira tomentosa =

Scientific classification
- Kingdom: Animalia
- Phylum: Arthropoda
- Class: Insecta
- Order: Coleoptera
- Suborder: Polyphaga
- Infraorder: Cucujiformia
- Family: Coccinellidae
- Genus: Adira
- Species: A. tomentosa

Binomial name
- Adira tomentosa (Mulsant, 1850)

Synonyms
- Epilachna tomentosa Mulsant, 1850; Epilachna fraterna var. sororia Mulsant, 1850; Rodolia pubivestis Mulsant, 1853

Species of beetle

Adira tomentosa is a species of beetle of the family Coccinellidae. It is found in Brazil and French Guiana.

== Description ==
Adults reach a length of about 5 mm. Adults are yellowish brown. The pronotum is brownish red with a yellowish brown lateral margin.
