= Adira richteri =

Scientific classification
- Kingdom: Animalia
- Phylum: Arthropoda
- Class: Insecta
- Order: Coleoptera
- Suborder: Polyphaga
- Infraorder: Cucujiformia
- Family: Coccinellidae
- Genus: Adira
- Species: A. richteri

Binomial name
- Adira richteri (Gordon, 1975)

Synonyms
- Dira richteri Gordon, 1975

Species of beetle

Adira richteri is a species of beetle of the family Coccinellidae. It is found in Colombia.

== Description ==
Adults reach a length of about 6.71 mm. Adults are yellow with reddish brown legs. The pronotum has a large black area and the elytron is black with a reddish-yellow lateral border.
