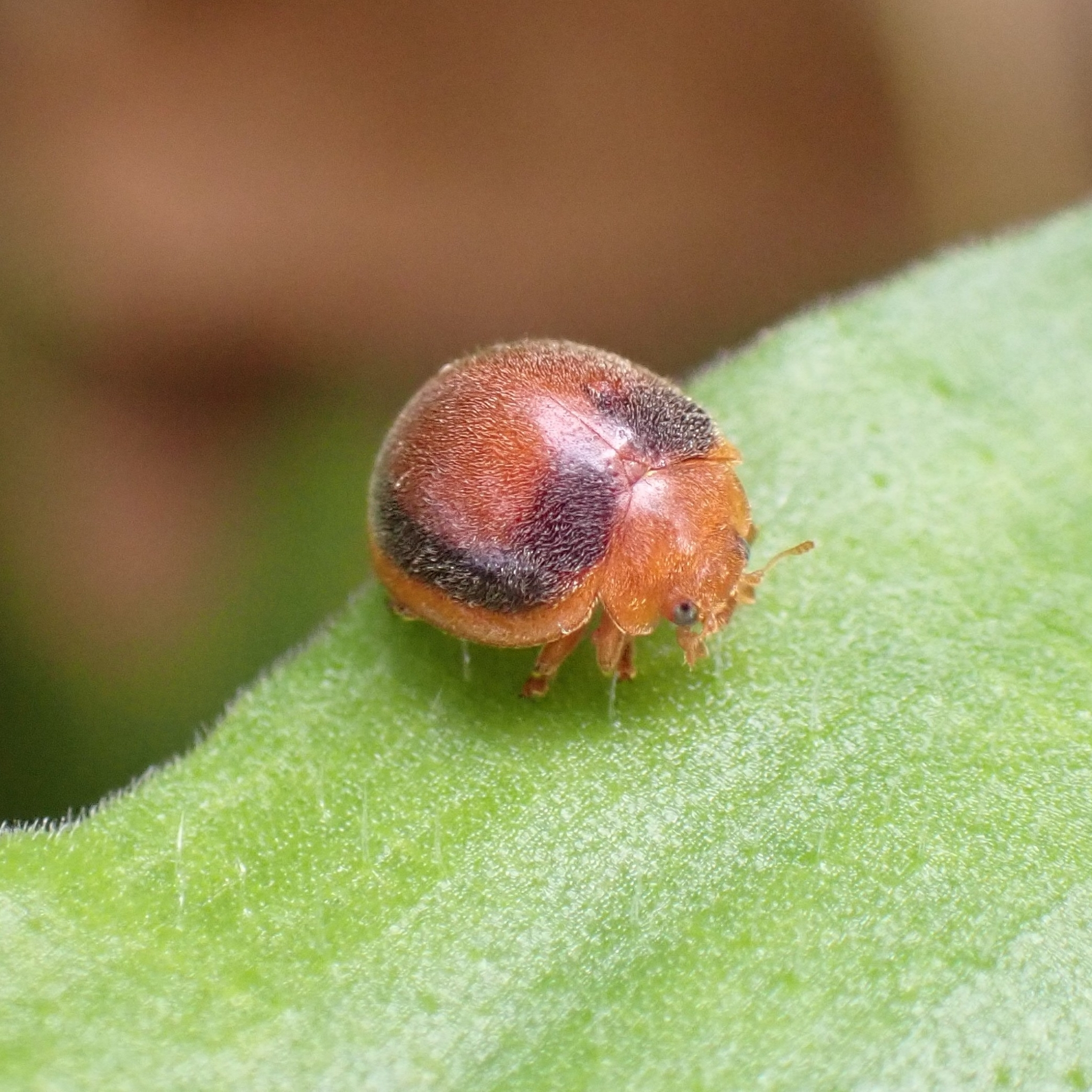

Scientific classification
- Kingdom: Animalia
- Phylum: Arthropoda
- Class: Insecta
- Order: Coleoptera
- Suborder: Polyphaga
- Infraorder: Cucujiformia
- Family: Coccinellidae
- Genus: Adira
- Species: A. obscurocincta

Binomial name
- Adira obscurocincta (Klug, 1829)

Synonyms
- Coccinella obscurocincta Klug, 1829; Epilachna placida Mulsant, 1850

= Adira obscurocincta =

Species of beetle

Adira obscurocincta is a species of beetle of the family Coccinellidae. It is found in Brazil, Bolivia, Uruguay, Paraguay and Argentina.

== Description ==
Adults reach a length of about 4.60–6.18 mm. Adults are yellow with a black head. The pronotum is black with yellow anterior and lateral margins. The elytron has yellow basal and lateral margins. There is a black ring inside the yellow margin and the disk of the elytron is reddish brown.
