= Bersama Pertemuan Ini =

Studio album by Francissca Peter & Royston Sta Maria
- Released: 24 October 1982
- Genre: Pop
- Label: EMI
- Producer: Omar Taib

Bersama Pertemuan Ini is the second duet studio album by Francissca Peter and Royston Sta Maria, released in 1982 on EMI.

== Track listing ==
- All arrangements by Omar Taib, except "Sejak Kau Ku Kenal" and "Cerita Lama Jangan Ditany" (arranged by S. Atan) and "Kisah Lalu" and "Demi Cinta Sejati" (arranged by Martin Pereira).

Track	Title	Composer and Lyricist	Length
1	"Bersama Pertemuan Ini"	Omar Taib / Habsah Hassan	4:36
2	"Sejak Kau Ku Kenal"	S. Atan / Haron Abdulmajid	4:06
3	"Janji Suci"	Omar Taib / Siti Zaleha Hashim	3:19
4	"Saat Manis"	Francissca Peter / Siti Zaleha Hashim	3:28
5	"Kisah Lalu"	Royston Sta Maria / Kasajiva A.S.	3:23
6	"Cerita Lama Jangan Ditanya"	S. Atan / Haron Abdulmajid	4:36
7	"Demi Cinta Sejati"	Micheal Veerapan / Kasajiva A.S.	3:00
8	"Hidup Sepantun Ombak Petang"	Omar Taib / Kasajiva A.S.	4:06
9	"Seandainya"	Royston Sta Maria / Habsah Hassan	4:29
10	"Pak Tua"	Timothy Dorado / Amran Shariff	2:46
