= Hafiz Suip =

Malaysian singer

- حفيظ شعيب
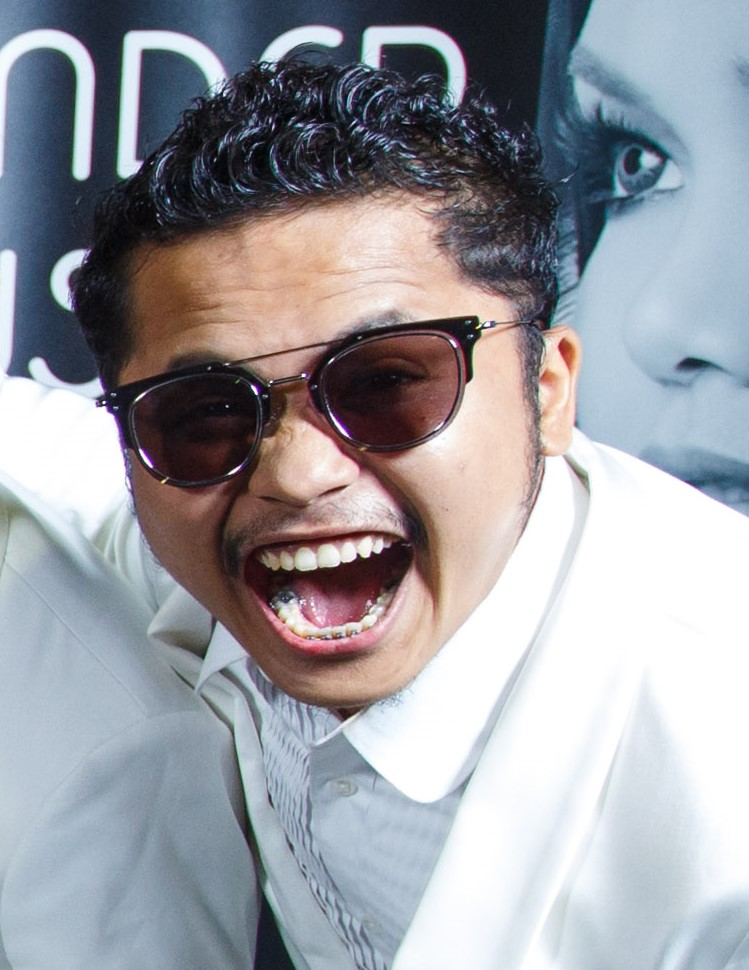
- Hafiz in 2016
- Born: Mohamad Hafiz bin Mohd Suip; 27 February 1990 (age 36); Kuching, Sarawak, Malaysia
- Other name: Hafiz AF7
- Spouse(s): Nuffery Jesreel Abdullah (m. 2016; div. 2025) Fiona Saffiyya (m. 2026)
- Children: 2
- Musical career
- Genres: Pop; dance; pop rock
- Occupations: Singer; student; actor
- Years active: 2009–present
- Label: Astro Talents Sdn Bhd

Mohamad Hafiz bin Mohamad Suip (born 27 February 1990) is a Malaysian singer, who won the seventh season of Akademi Fantasia, receiving 46 percent of over 4.2 million votes. His debut album, Masih Jelas, was released on 14 July 2009.

== Early life ==
Hafiz was born on 27 February 1990 to Mohd Suip, and his wife Halizawati HM Salleh. He is the oldest and the only boy in his siblings. After graduating in SMK St Joseph, he joined the reality competition Idol in early 2009 after passing the audition in Kuching.

== Akademi Fantasia 7 ==
Hafiz competed against thirteen other contestants to win Season 7 of Akademi Fantasia. His winning potential was shown from week 1 when he was named the 'Best student of the night'

Throughout the competition, Hafiz remained at top two when the voting session was closed at the end of every concert, with six collective highest votes. Before the final concert, most media buzz predicted Hafiz to be the winner of the season. At the end of the finale, the prediction came true when he was crowned as the seventh winner of the show, beating 4 other students, with a massive votes of 46%, the highest percentage of votes in the show's production. He took back the male dominate winner crown from previous winner fifth season's Mila Jirin and sixth season's Stacy Anam who are both females.

=== Song performances on Akademi Fantasia ===
Week	Instructed Songs	Original Artist	Result #
Week 1	"Lagu Kita"	Aizat	1
Week 2	"Cinta Ini Membunuhku" "Toyol"	D-Masiv; Aznil Nawawi	1
Week 3	"Mat Disco"	Sudirman	2
Week 4	"Cinta ini"	Siti Nurhaliza	2
Week 5	"Terlanjur Cinta" (with Mila Af5)	Rossa & Pasha Ungu	2
Week 6	"Pak Belalang"	Kristal	1
Week 7	"Kau Yang Punya"	Malique & Najwa	1
Week 8	"Di Manakan Ku Cari Ganti"	P. Ramlee	2
Week 9	"Laskar Pelangi" "I Believe I Can Fly"	Nidji and R. Kelly	1
Finale	"Kau Bunga Cintaku" "Masih Jelas"	Anuar Zain; Hafiz	Winner

== Career ==
=== Post Akademi Fantasia ===
His first album, titled Masih Jelas was released on 14 July 2009. He recorded 5 songs including, "Masih Jelas", for the album, which also featured singles by 4 other AF7 finalists. "Masih Jelas" was nominated in the Best Pop Song and Best Arrangements in Anugerah Industri Muzik (AIM17). Hafiz also performed at the final of Anugerah Juara Lagu 24 as one of the strongest contenders. Being nominated as one of Anugerah Bintang Popular Berita Harian 2009's Best New Artiste also added feathers onto his caps. Although he did not win any of these, it was a good exposure for the young artist.

His latest foray in the entertainment world was being involved in KITA : The Musical, a musical theatre which was inspired by 1Malaysia. He played the lead, Rahman in the multi-racial ensemble play staged at the famous Istana Budaya, Kuala Lumpur. Also involved in the play were other ASTRO talents, Eric Lin, Michael Rao, fellow AF7 alumni Nas Adila and Amy Wang. The theatre was a success and it went into the Malaysia Guinness Book of Record.

=== 2011 – present ===
Early in the year 2011, fans was shocked to hear that the young singer was involved in a traffic accident at 10pm on 3 January while he was driving home after a rehearsal. The car that he had driven, a Honda Accord, was badly damaged after the car spun then smashed into a tree and a street lamp post on the Penchala Highway. The latter was fortunate after only suffering from neck injury and was taken to KPJ Damansara Hospital for treatment.

Prior to his traffic accident, fans was wondering if the young star could perform at the Anugerah Juara Lagu on the 9th. Although the doctors said their concerns on the young star's injured throat, he mention to the media that he would still go on with his performance and hoped that his injury would not affect his performance. On 9 January, Hafiz was spurred with winning 2 categories on the 25th Anugerah Juara Lagu at Stadium Putra Bukit Jalil. He had won the Best Vocal Performance and had won 3rd Place with his song "Noktah Cinta" (composer: Ajai and lyricist: Sheikh Qalam).

Later in January, the singer release his new music video for his single "Awan Nano" and had regain many interest from the locals. The video had regain a positive views among the viewers and many had praised for his good acting skills in the video. The music video also stars music legend Herman Tino who played his father.

The single "Awan Nano" which mainly composed by Malaysian famous composer, M.Nasir and lyricist Buddhi Hikayat prove to a success. On 15 July, Hafiz had won 2 awards at the Anugerah Planet Muzik (a music award in collaboration of 3 S.E.A country; Malaysia, Indonesia and Singapore) where he had won the Best Song (Malaysia) and Best Song among the three country with "Awan Nano". However he lost the Best Male Artist (all country) category, which he was also nominated, to fellow local singer Faizal Tahir.

Hafiz also starred alongside his friends Aril and Akim in Astro Ria Teenage TV Show Kau dan Aku. This is Hafiz's debut acting project.

"Awan Nano" was shortlisted as one of the semi-finalists for AJL26. On 18 November 2011, the song was nominated as a finalist. However the list of the songs for the final will only be determined on 2 December 2011. AJL26 will be held in January 2012.

He won best vocals and his song "Awan Nano" won best song at the 26th annual Anugerah Juara Lagu (AJL). In April 2012, Hafiz won another prestigious award, Anugerah Bintang Popular Berita Harian, ABPBH 25, as The most Popular Male Singer. This fan-voted award held annually by Berita Harian, one of the most popular Malay News Paper in Malaysia. He won the award over his senior fellow nominees such as Anuar Zain, Faizal Tahir, Black & fellow Akedemi Fantasia alumni, singer/ songwriter, Aizat. Hafiz is currently competing against 15 other famous & established singer to become so called Super Star in MANIA. This competition offers RM500 000 to the winner & RM 300 000 to the Music Producer mentoring the winner. The 15 singers are divided into 3 groups of 5, each group called Galaxy is guided by one famous music producer. The 3 music producers are Dato' M Nasir, Aubrey Suwito & Ahmad Dhani. Hafiz in Ahmad Dhani Galaxy. His Stellar rendition of Adele's "Someone Like You" brought him to the top of the voting chart at the end of their first concert in week 4 of the game. Hafiz become champion of Super Star in Mania on 20 May 2012, winning RM500,000 and a Gold Trophy from the competition.

Hafiz represented Malaysia at the first ABU TV Song Festival 2012 which was held at the KBS Concert Hall, in Seoul, South Korea on 14 October 2012.

Hafiz once again won Anugerah Juara Lagu 28 on 26 January 2014 with his single "Bahagiamu Deritaku". He also won "mobile award" and "Best Performance" at the event.

In 2017, Hafiz will comeback with new single song title "Kejar".

== Discography ==
=== Albums ===
- Masih Jelas (2009)
- Hafiz (2012) Indonesian Album, Warner Music Indonesia
- Luahan Hati Anak Seni (2013)

=== Singles ===
- "Masih Jelas" (2009)
- "Noktah Cinta" (2010)
- "Lebih Dewasa" (2010, OST KAU DAN AKU MUSIM 2)
- "Ilusi Dan Fantasi" (2011)
- "Untuk Kamu" (2011, OST OMBAK RINDU)
- "Awan Nano" (2011)
- "Ombak Rindu" (2012)
- "Watak" (2012)
- "Ku Akui" (2012)
- "Muara Hati" (2012)
- "Kita Satu" (2012)
- "Hadirkan Aku Dalam Ingatan" (2012, LAGU RAYA)
- "Matahari" (2012, Indonesia)
- "Bahagiamu Deritaku" (2012, Indonesia)
- "Patah hati" (2012, Indonesia)
- "Hanya Ingin Kau Cinta" (2012, Indonesia)
- "Satu Cerita" (2013)
- "Kesimpulan" (2013)
- "Mungkinkah" (2013)
- "Deklamasiku" (2013)
- "Salahkah" (2013), (Malaysia & Indonesia OST 'Bukan Kerana Aku Tak Cinta')
- "Kejar" (2017)
- "Lepaskan Pergi" (2017, OST Pinjamkan Hatiku)
- "Hari Ini Dalam Sejarah" (2018)
- "Kisah Cinta Kita" (2019, OST Dia Menantu Rahsia)
- "Takdir Tercipta" (2019)
- "Sinar Cinta" (2020, OST Seindah 7 Warna Pelangi)
- "Takluk Cinta" (2020)

== Duets ==
- "Hanya Kerana Cinta" (feat. Aril AF7, Anne HOT FM, Tini HOT FM, Ayu (LAGU RAYA) 2010
- "Kau Ku Temu" (feat. Akim, Aril, Anith OST KAU DAN AKU MUSIM 2) 2010
- "Warkah" (feat. Akim Ahmad, Aril AF7, Datuk Aznil Haji Nawawi) (LAGU RAYA) 2011
- "Ombak Rindu" (feat. Adira) 2011
- "Sandarkan Pada Kenangan" (feat. Mimi Sham OST AZURA) 2012
- "Muara Hati" (feat. Dato' Siti Nurhaliza) 2012
- "Salahkah" (feat. Dato' Rossa) 2013
- "Inspirasi" (feat. Faizal Tahir) 2015
- "Terimaku Seadanya" (feat. Misha Omar) 2016 : OST Uda & Dara
- "Aku Negaraku" (with Jaclyn Victor) 2017
- "Takdir Tercipta" (feat. Adira) 2020
- "Berakhirlah Pencarianku" (feat. Ernie Zakri) 2021

== Filmography ==
=== Television series ===
Year	Title	Role	TV channel	Notes
2010–2011	Kau & Aku 2	Hafiz	Astro Ria	
2012	Tanah Kubur (Season 4)	Jamal	Astro Oasis	Episode: "Fitnah"
2013	Elly & Epit (Season 2)	Hafiz	Astro Ceria	

== Awards ==
Year	Award	Category	Nominated work	Result
2009	Akademi Fantasia, Season 7		Hafiz	Won
2009	Anugerah Industri Muzik (AIM) 17	Best Pop Song	"Masih Jelas"	Nominated
2009	Anugerah Industri Muzik (AIM) 17	Best Musical Arrangement in a Song	"Masih Jelas"	Nominated
2009	Anugerah Juara Lagu 24	Last Candidate	"Masih Jelas"	Nominated
2009	Anugerah Bintang Popular Berita Harian 2009	Most Popular New Male Artist	Hafiz	Nominated
2010	Anugerah Juara Lagu 25	Best Vocal Performance	Hafiz	Won
2010	Anugerah Juara Lagu 25	Third Prize	"Noktah Cinta"	Won
2011	Sarawak Youth Icon and Sports Award 2011	Youth Icon – Culture/Arts	Hafiz	Won
2011	Anugerah Planet Muzik 2011	Best Song (Malaysia)	"Awan Nano"	Won
2011	Anugerah Planet Muzik 2011	Best Male Artist (Regional)	Hafiz	Nominated
2011	Anugerah Planet Muzik 2011	Best Song (Regional)	"Awan Nano"	Won
2011	Anugerah Pilihan Pembaca Media Hiburan	Promising Award	Hafiz	Nominated
2011	Anugerah Bintang Popular Berita Harian 2011	Most Popular Male Singer	Hafiz	Won
2011	Anugerah Juara Lagu 26	Best Vocal Performance	Hafiz	Won
2011	Anugerah Juara Lagu 26	Best Song	"Awan Nano"	Won
2012	Anugerah Stail EH!	Best Performance Celebrity	Hafiz	Nominated
2012	Shout! Awards	Popstar Award	Hafiz	Nominated
2012	Anugerah Planet Muzik	Most Popular Regional Artist	Hafiz	Nominated
2012	Anugerah Planet Muzik	Best Male Artist	Hafiz	Won
2012	Anugerah Planet Muzik	Best Song	"Ombak Rindu" with Adira	Nominated
2012	Anugerah Planet Muzik	Most Popular Regional Songs	"Ombak Rindu" with Adira	Nominated
2012	Sarawak State Awards	Ahli Bintang Sarawak (ABS)	Hafiz	Won
2013	Anugerah Juara Lagu 27	Best Vocal Performance	Hafiz	Won
2013	Anugerah Juara Lagu 27	Third Prize	"Ku Akui"	Won
2013	Anugerah Juara Lagu 27	Most Downloaded Song for Celcom Mobile X-pax	"Ombak Rindu"	Won
2013	Anugerah Bintang Popular Berita Harian 2012	Most Popular Male Singer	Hafiz	Won
2013	Anugerah Bintang Popular Berita Harian 2012	Most Popular Group/Duo	Hafiz & Adira	Nominated
2013	Mania		Hafiz	Won
2013	Blockbuster Awards	Best Theme Song	"Ombak Rindu" with Adira	Won
2013	25th Malaysia Film Festival	Best Theme Song	"Ombak Rindu" with Adira	Won
2013	Anugerah Planet Muzik 2013	Artis Serantau Paling Popular	Hafiz	Won
2013	Anugerah Planet Muzik 2013	Lagu Serantau Paling Popular	Hafiz & Siti Nurhaliza	Won
2013	Anugerah Planet Muzik 2013	Best Duo/Collaboration	Hafiz & Siti Nurhaliza	Won
2013	Shout! Awards 2013	Popstar Award	Hafiz	Won
2013	Shout! Awards 2013	Power Vocal Award	Hafiz	Won
2014	Anugerah Industri Muzik 2013	Best Album	Luahan Hati Anak Seni	Won
2014	Anugerah Industri Muzik 2013	Best Engineered Album	Luahan Hati Anak Seni	Won
2014	Anugerah Industri Muzik 2013	Best Vocal Performance in a Song (Male)	"Bahagiamu Deritaku"	Won
2014	Anugerah Industri Muzik 2013	Best Musical Arrangement in a Song	"Mungkinkah"	Nominated
2014	Anugerah Juara Lagu 28	Best Performance	"Bahagiamu Deritaku"	Won
2014	Anugerah Juara Lagu 28	First Prize	"Bahagiamu Deritaku"	Won
2014	Anugerah Juara Lagu 28	Most Downloaded Song for Celcom Mobile X-pax	"Bahagiamu Deritaku"	Won
2014	Anugerah Bintang Popular Berita Harian 27	Most Popular Male Singer	Hafiz	Won
2014	Anugerah Planet Muzik 2014	Best Collaboration (Artiste)	Hafiz & Rossa – "Salahkah"	Nominated
2014	Anugerah Planet Muzik 2014	Best Male Artiste	Hafiz – "Matahari"	Nominated
2014	Anugerah Planet Muzik 2014	Best Duo/Group	Hafiz & Rossa – "Salahkah"	Won
2014	Anugerah Planet Muzik 2014	APM Most Popular Artiste	Hafiz	Nominated
2014	Anugerah Planet Muzik 2014	Social Media Icon	Hafiz	Nominated
2016	Anugerah Juara Lagu 31	Second Prize	Hafiz & Misha Omar - "Terimaku Seadanya"	Won
2020	Anugerah Juara Lagu 34	Best Vocal Performance	"Kisah Cinta Kita"	Won
2020	Anugerah Juara Lagu 34	Best Performance	"Kisah Cinta Kita"	Won

Preceded by None	Malaysia in the ABU TV Song Festival; 2012 with "Awan Nano"	Succeeded by Alyah with "Kisah hati"
