= Sekadar Di Pinggiran =

Studio album by Francissca Peter
- Released: 1986
- Genre: Pop
- Label: Warner Music

Sekadar Di Pinggiran is the third studio album from Malaysian singer Francissca Peter released in 1986.

== Awards and recognitions ==
- The album released by Warner Music Malaysia achieves double Platinum status.
- Malaysian readers voted "Sekadar Di Pinggiran" as "Song of the Year" and another, "Ku Ke Udara Lagi", as "Third Best Song of the Year" in a poll organised by The New Straits Times daily. Her album Sekadar Di Pinggiran is voted "Album of the Year" while Fran wins the award for "Best Female Artiste of the Year".
- Sekadar Di Pinggiran won Champion of Songs Award at the Anugerah Juara Lagu, a popular annual music competition in Malaysia, organized by TV3 in 1986.
- The song also was awarded International Award for "Best Song" at the 'Asean Song Festival' in 1987

== Track listing ==
Track	Title	Composer and Lyricist	Length
1	"Ku Ke Udara Lagi"	Manan Ngah / Seri Bayu	
2	"Sekadar Di Pinggiran"	Manan Ngah / Lukhman S	
3	"Si Kunang-Kunang"	Manan Ngah / Mukhlis Nor	
4	"Bukan Salah Pilihan"	Manan Ngah / S. Amin Shahab	
5	"Pasti"	Manan Ngah / Lukhman S	
6	"Akulah Kekasihmu"	Manan Ngah / Mama Juwie	
7	"Dilema Seorang Insan"	Manan Ngah / S. Amin Shahab	
8	"Aku Kehilanganmu"	Manan Ngah / Habsah Hassan	
9	"Hadiah"	Manan Ngah / S. Amin Shahab	
10	"Semalam"	Manan Ngah / S. Amin Shahab	
