= Aril (entertainer) =

Malaysian singer, actor, dancer and TV host

Aril Pilus اريل ڤيلوس
- Born: Khairil Azam bin Pilus; 5 November 1985 (age 41); Kuala Lumpur, Malaysia
- Genres: Pop, dance
- Occupations: Singer, actor, dancer, tv host
- Years active: 2009–present
- Label: Maestro Talent (former)

Khairil Azam bin Pilus (born 5 November 1985) better known by his stage name Aril, is a Malaysian singer, actor, dancer and TV host, also known by his stage name of Aril. Aril is the younger brother of late fellow artist Izwan Pilus.

== Career ==
Aril had hosted some tv program long before he drafted to AF. It was when he little bit known as Ajam Pilus. Later he appeared in Gangstarz 2007 (vocal group talent search) as member of First Edition. He also featured in Xpose- the program had broadcast in Astro Prima about current trend. Aril was interviewed in episode that revealing the rising trend of shuffle dance of that period.

=== Akademi Fantasia ===
Aril joined and became 1st runner-up of the seventh season of Akademi Fantasia, receiving 22% percent of over 4.2 million votes although he was eliminated on the 7th week of the competition, but he was voted back-in by the competition by 'AFMASUK' of the voters, and won the 2nd place in the season 7 final round in May 2009.

=== Actor & host ===
Aril is also an actor, starring alongside another seventh season, student, Akim and past fifth season winner, Mila Jirin in TV show called Kau dan Aku.

He also has a lead role in telemovie call Shuffle Milikku which recently premiered in Astro.

Aril is also the new TV host for Trek Selebriti.

In his singing career, he recently has two released singles: Toksik and Menatap Matamu. Along with show alums Mawi, Mila, Stacy, Hafiz, Akim, Isma and Yazid, Pilus now has his "chart-topping songs" released in a compilation album by Era FM.

=== Songs performed on Akademi Fantasia ===
Week	Instructed Songs	Original Artist	Result #
Week 1	"Rahsia Perempuan"	Ari Lasso	4
Week 2	""Benar-Benar" "Robot"	Adam; Adam	3
Week 3	"Andainya Aku Pergi Dulu"	Alleycats	4
Week 4	"Lakaran Kehidupan"	Siti Nurhaliza	7
Week 5	"Aku dan Dirimu" with Marsha	Ari Lasso & Bunga Citra Lestari	7
Week 6	"Yang Pernah"	Estranged	4
Week 7	"Nakal"	Gigi	7(eliminated)
Week 8	"(none)"	-	-
Week 9	"(none)"	-	-
Finale	"Kasih Tak Sayang" "Toksik"	Padi; Aril	2

== Filmography ==
=== TV Series ===
Year	Title	Role	TV Network	Notes
2009-10	Kau dan Aku	Himself	Astro Ria	
2012-13	Kau dan Aku (Season 2)	Himself	Astro Ria	
2018	Ammar & Opie	Malik	TV3	

=== Telemovie ===
Year	Title	Role	TV Network	Notes
2010	Shuffle Milikku		Astro Ria	

=== Television ===
Year	Title	Role	TV Network	Notes
2010 - 11	Trek Selebriti	Himself (Host)	Astro Ria	
2016 - 17	CCTV	Himself - with Aliff Farhan (Host)	Astro Ria	
2017	Air Tangan Bonda	Himself	Astro Maya HD	as an invitation guest with her mother

== Hardstyle Republic ==
Aril is known as 'Ajam' the Gambler in the Melbourne Shuffle group 'Hardstyle Republic'. Outside of Malaysian showbiz, he has his own shuffling scene fan-base who are international followers from YouTube.
