= Izwan Pilus =

Izwan Pilus عزوان ڤيلوس
- Born: Khairil Izwan bin Pilus; 24 November 1979; Kuala Lumpur, Malaysia
- Died: 21 January 2012 (aged 32) Ampang Hospital, Ampang, Selangor
- Genres: Pop, Ballad, R&B
- Occupations: Singer, Host TV
- Instrument: Vocals
- Years active: 2004–2012
- Label: Metro Muzik Sdn. Bhd.

Khairil Izwan bin Pilus (24 November 1979 – 21 January 2012) was a Malaysian singer and television host. He is known for his songs Kembali Senyum and Indah Lelapku.

== Personal life ==
Born in Kuala Lumpur, Izwan is the older brother of fellow artist Aril. His family originated from Taman Nyalas Permai, Jasin.

Among some of the artists who were made participants besides Izwan were singers such as Farawahida, Siti Sarah Raisuddin, Ernie Zakri, Misha Omar as well as Sharifah Zarina and Ani Maiyuni as the earliest participants before being made finalists for the show. At the same time, he had also made it to the semi-finals with the other Bintang RTM finalists but he did not succeed because he was eliminated in the semi-finals.

Aside from being a singer, Izwan also works in the field of lawyering and has been a lawyer with Abby Nadzri (Ahmad Idham's younger brother) in Suara Emas Bintang RTM anjuran RTM in 2008. He has also competed with other artists and lawyers namely Alisya and Muadz in Bintang RTM in 2009.

== Death ==
Izwan contracted leptospirosis and he died on 21 January 2012 at Ampang Hospital, Selangor. His death was reported on Twitter by his brother, Khairil Azam Pilus.

He was buried in Kampung Pelembang Islam Cemetery in Jasin.

== Album ==
- Erti Kasih (Mean of Heart), 2006
