= Shahir =

Malaysian singer and actor (born 1988)

- شاهر
- Born: Ahmad Shahir bin Zawawi; 5 September 1988 (age 38); Ipoh, Perak, Malaysia
- Other name: Shahir
- Occupations: Singer; actor; host; student
- Years active: 2010–present
- Spouse: Jaskin Jaludin (m. 2022)
- Musical career
- Genre: Pop
- Label: Maestro Talents Sdn. Bhd.

Ahmad Shahir bin Zawawi (born 5 September 1988), better known by his stage name Shahir, is a Malaysian singer and actor, who rose to fame after winning the eighth season of Akademi Fantasia.

== Biography ==
=== Early life ===
Shahir's father, Zawawi Abdullah, is a teacher by profession, while his mother, Mahanum Othman, is a full-time housewife. He is the oldest out of five children.

Shahir studied at Sekolah Kebangsaan Kampar, Kampar, Perak from Year 1 until Year 6 and then at Sekolah Menengah Kebangsaan Agama Slim River, Slim River, Perak from Form 1 until Form 5. Prior to his audition for Akademi Fantasia, he was an engineering student at Centre for Foundation Studies, International Islamic University Malaysia. He is also a former member of the nasyid group, Saujana.

He currently lives in Kuala Lumpur, Malaysia.

=== Akademi Fantasia 2010 ===
Shahir competed against twelve other contestants in the running to win the 8th season of Akademi Fantasia.

Shahir was eliminated after receiving the fewest votes in Week 7. In the Week 8 concert, AFMASUK was introduced and during the Debaran Concert, he was voted back in after receiving the highest number of votes. At the end of the final concert, he was crowned the winner of the Season 8, beating 4 other students. He was the first contestant to be crowned champion after being eliminated and then voted back in via AFMASUK.

==== Song performances on Akademi Fantasia, Season 8 ====
Week	Instructed Songs	Original Artist	Result #
Week 1	"Khatimah Cinta"	6ixth Sense	Safe
Week 2	"Jangan Nakal"	Aliff Satar	Safe
Week 3	"Derita Cinta"	Jamal Abdillah	Safe
Week 4	"Always Be My Baby"	Mariah Carey	Safe
Week 5	"Anggapan Mu"	Ziana Zain	Safe
Week 6	"Kau Yang Satu"	Ramli Sarip	Safe
Week 7	"Tiara"	Kris	Eliminated
Week 8 (Debaran)	–	-	AFMASUK
Week 9	"Tak Mungkin Berpaling" "Tamally Maak"	Mawi and Amr Diab	1
Finale	"Biru Mata Hitamku" "Kebahagiaan Dalam Perpisahan"	Wings; Shahir AF8	Winner

=== Singles ===
- Kebahagiaan Dalam Perpisahan
- Tiba ft. Faizal Tahir & Faizal Ismail
- Dimanakan Ku Cari Ganti (tribute for P. Ramlee) ft. Stacy, Aizat, Ning Baizura, KRU, Atilia, Ella etc.
- Luar Biasa
- Pendam
- Cerita Kita
- Dia Yang Kau Pilih
- Cintakan Kembali
- Aku Yang Berdosa

== Filmography ==
=== Film ===
Year	Title	Role	Broadcast	Notes
2010	Spider-Man	Peter Parker	Astro	Voice over; Malaysian version
2010	Spider-Man 3	Peter Parker	Astro	Voice over; Malaysian version
2011	KARAK – Laluan Puaka	Nik	KRU Studios	Director: Yusry Abdul Halim

=== Television ===
Year	Title	Role	Broadcast
2010	Lawaknya Fantasia Raya	Shahir	Astro RIA
2011	Cerciter Cinta	Ustaz Sarjan	Astro RIA
2021	Hijrahkan Laguku	Himself	TV Alhijrah

== Programmes Hosted ==
Year	Title	Broadcast
2010	Diariku...Shahir ( 8 Episodes )	Astro RIA
2010	Lemang, Lebaran, Labuci ( Episode 3 )	Astro RIA
2010	Konsert Reunion AF8	Astro RIA

== Awards and nominations ==
Year	Award	Category	Outcome
2010	BRAND'S Ambassador	BRAND'S GENERASI HEBAT	–
2010	Ikon Belia Perak	–	–
2011	Anugerah Bintang Popular Berita Harian	Popular Male Artist	Nominated
2011	Anugerah Bintang Popular Berita Harian	New Popular Male Artist	Won
2011	Anugerah Bintang Popular Berita Harian	Red Carpet: Best Dress ABPBH 2010 (Male).	Won
2012	Anugerah Blokbuster	Anugerah Hero Baru Terhebat "(Karak)"	Won
2012	Anugerah Planet Muzik	Lagu Serantau Paling Popular "(Kebahagiaan Dalam Perpisahan)"	Nominated

== Concerts and tours ==
Year	Title	Broadcast
2010	Konsert Reunion AF8	Astro RIA
2010	Inspirasi Sanubari	Astro OASIS
2010	Lebaran Diva Dato' Siti Nurhaliza	Astro PRIMA
2010	Dari Studio Shahir	Astro RIA
2011	Anugerah Juara Lagu 25 (finalist)	TV3
2011	Atas Nama Cinta....Rossa	Astro RIA
