= Siapa Dia Sebelum Daku =

Studio album by Francissca Peter & Royston Sta Maria
- Released: June 2, 1982
- Genre: Pop
- Label: EMI

The first duet studio album by Francissca Peter & Royston Sta Maria released in 1982.

== Track listing ==
Track	Title	Composer and Lyricist	Length
1	"Tak Kenal Maka Tak Cinta"	S.Atan & Haron Abdulmajid	2:53
2	"Siapa Dia Sebelum Daku"	Omar Taib & Habsah Hassan	3:42
3	"Panggilan Desa"	Royston Sta Maria & Amira	3:39
4	"Disoal Kesangsian"	Omar Taib & Anumiza	3:00
5	"Sekadar Di Sini"	Omar Taib & Habsah Hassan	3:50
6	"Waktu Dalam Bercinta"	Copyright Controlled & Rina	2:15
7	"Usah Kau Tanyakan"	Omar Taib & Siti Zaleha Hashim	3:35
8	"Hingga Kau Kembali"	Royston Sta Maria & Eyla	3:32
9	"Belailah Kerinduanku"	Omar Taib & Rina	4:09
10	"Liku Cinta"	S.Atan & Haron Abdulmajid	3:31
