= Kau dan Aku =

- Genre: Drama
- Starring: Mila (AF5) Akim (AF7); Aril (AF7) Raja Farah
- Opening theme: kau dan aku
- Ending theme: kau dan aku
- Country of origin: Malaysia
- Original language: Bahasa Malaysia

Original release
- Network: Astro Ria

Kau dan Aku is a Malaysian adaptation drama from a Venezuelan television series called Somos Tu Y Yo. This drama airs at Astro Ria (104) every Saturday at 10 PM (Local Time).

== Plot ==
Mila broke up with Aril at the past time. Mila continues learning at one College called Harmoni College and Mila meets again with Aril. He is still in love with Mila but this time, Aril has a new girlfriend called Farah, the antagonist in this drama. Then, Mila meets Akim and falls in love with him which makes Aril jealous.

== Cast ==
- Akim (AF7) as Akim
- Mila (AF5) as Mila
- Aril(AF7) as Aril
- Ika Nabila (AF6) as Fitri
- Raja Farah as Farah
- Noni (AF5) as Lisa
- Amar Baharin (Anak Wayang) as Ashraf
- Anita Baharom as Anita
- Hairey Azhak as Ali Azwan
- Puteri Fatin Nasuha as Cici
- Farish Aziz as Farish
- Sabrina Ali as Puan Linda
- Azizah Mahzan as Puan Luthfia
- Nurul Huda Wahab
- Riezman Khuzaimi
- Nurlina
- Sherry Merlis
