= Harapan (album) =

Studio album by Francissca Peter
- Released: 1988
- Genre: Pop
- Label: Warner Music

Harapan is the fifth studio album from Malaysian singer Francissca Peter released in 1988.

== Awards and recognitions ==
- The album released by Warner Music Malaysia achieves Platinum status.
- Fran's songs featured in Warner Music Malaysia's release "14 Award Winning Songs" from various Malaysian artistes.
- Most famous duet song "Kehebatan Cinta" with Malaysian King of Pop, Jamal Abdillah.
- Song entitled "Diriku Terbelenggu" won 1st runner-up in Song Festival Award "Anugerah Juara Lagu".

== Track listing ==
Track	Title	Composer and Lyricist	Length
1	"Hingga Ke Akhir Waktu"	J. Jay / Seri Bayu	3:59
2	"Kehebatan Cinta" _{(duet with Jamal Abdillah)}	J. Jay / Juwie	4:12
3	"Aku Teman Setia"	Shamsuddin Sidek / Seri Bayu	3:58
4	"Kau Sebahagian Diri Ini"	Royston Sta Maria / Habsah Hassan	4:16
5	"Mutiara Dari Utara"	Ramli Sarip / S. Amin Shahab	5:24
6	"Aku Hanya Penghibur Biasa"	Shamsuddin Sidek / S. Amin Shahab	4:37
7	"Diriku Terbelenggu"	A Ali / Habsah Hassan	4:12
8	"Terbalas Cinta"	S Weiss / B. Baum / M. Nasir	4:07
9	"Kau Yang Istimewa"	Shamsuddin Sidek / S. Amin Shahab	4:17
10	"Biarpun Segenggam Harapan"	Ramli Sarip / Seri Bayu	4:41
