= Harapan Rainforest =

Rainforest in Jambi, Sumatra, Indonesia

Coordinates: 2°14′S 103°19′E

Harapan Rainforest is a 98,555-hectare area of rainforest in the province of Jambi, Sumatra, Indonesia. The British Royal Society for the Protection of Birds is campaigning to plant one million new trees to renew the forest because of its rich wildlife, which is vulnerable to the logging industry.

== Flora and fauna ==
Despite having been selectively logged in the 1970s, the forest is still considered among the most biodiverse on the planet, containing about 20% of the remaining lowland forests of Sumatra. It provides habitat to over 300 species of bird, as well as the critically endangered Sumatran tiger and Sumatran elephant.

== Conservation ==
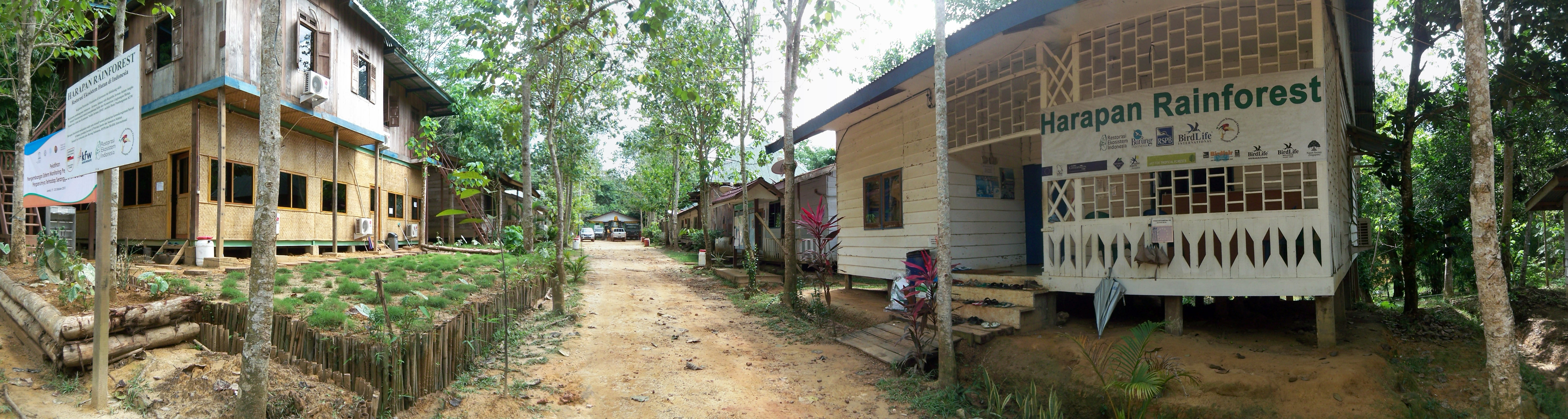
Camp in the rainforest

The Harapan Rainforest is managed under a 95-year license by a group of NGOs comprising Burung Indonesia, Birdlife International and the Royal Society for the Protection of Birds.

== Threats ==
A proposed 51 km long and 50-m-wide highway through the area that would enable 850 truckloads of coal a day to pass is considered by environmental groups as a major threat to the wildlife. The proposal would remove an estimated 154 hectares of rainforest, would ease access for illegal hunters and loggers and would fragment the habitat of the Sumatran tigers.

Small holder conversion of the forest to oil palm is another major threat to the forest and the objectives of ecosystem restoration.
