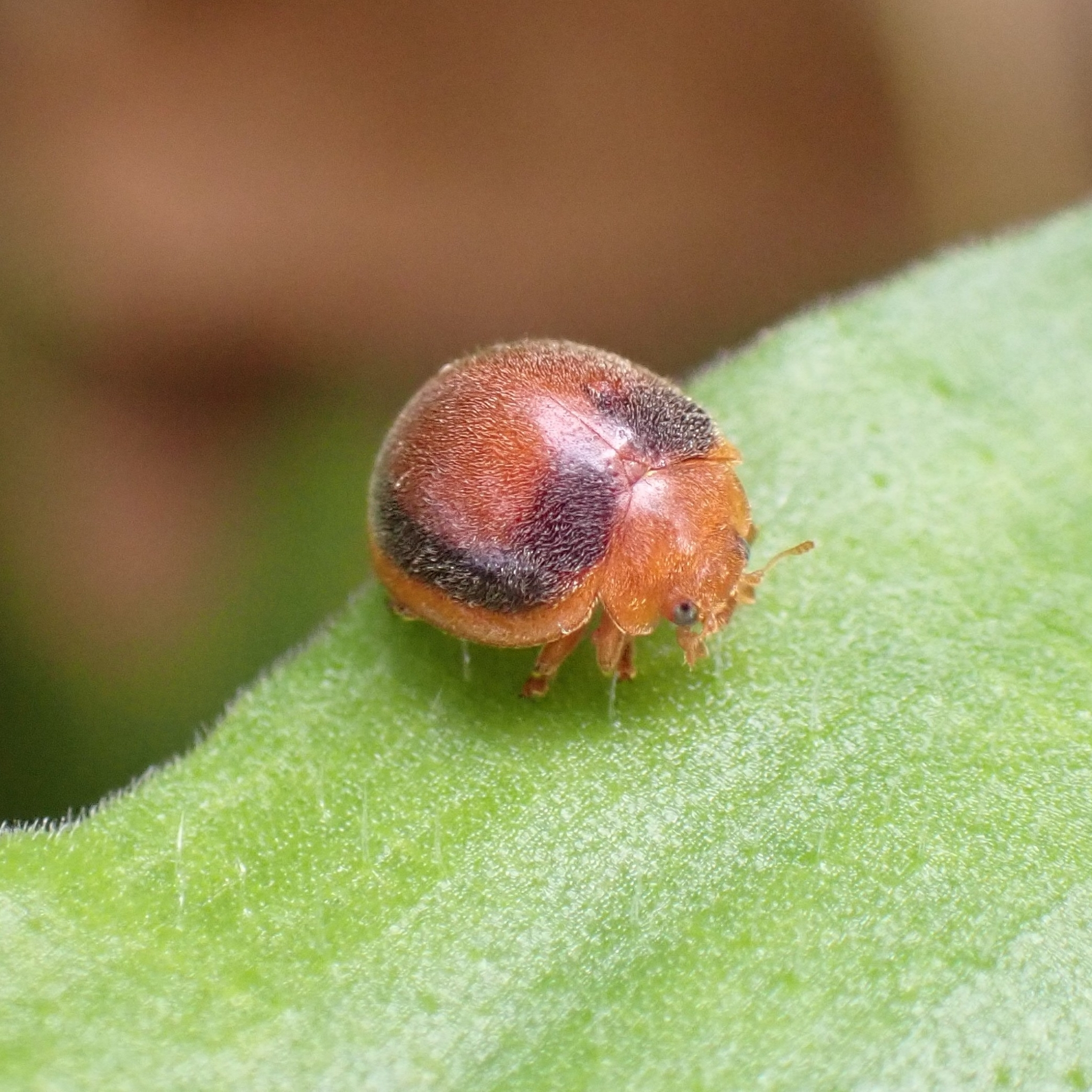
- Adira obscurocincta

Scientific classification
- Kingdom: Animalia
- Phylum: Arthropoda
- Class: Insecta
- Order: Coleoptera
- Suborder: Polyphaga
- Infraorder: Cucujiformia
- Family: Coccinellidae
- Tribe: Epilachnini
- Genus: Adira; Gordon & Almeida, 1986

Synonyms
- Dira Mulsant, 1850 (nec Gistl, 1848)

= Adira (beetle) =

Genus of beetles

Adira is a genus of beetles in the family Coccinellidae. It was first described by Gordon & Almeida, 1986

== Description ==
The genus is known only from the Americas, and Adira clarkii has been recorded on host plants of the Aristolochiaceae family. It is morphologically similar to the Mada and Damatula genera. Species grow between 4.5 and 6.3 centimetres in length, and the elytra are usually orange to brown in colour.

== Taxonomy ==
Adira contains nine species.

- Adira clarkii (Crotch, 1874) - Brazil
- Adira gossypiata (Mulsant, 1850) - Bolivia
- Adira gossypioides (Gordon, 1975) - Panama, Colombia
- Adira inexculta (Gordon, 1975) - Bolivia
- Adira nucula (Weise, 1902) - Peru
- Adira obscurocincta (Klug, 1829) - Brazil, Bolivia, Uruguay, Paraguay, Argentina
- Adira richteri (Gordon, 1975) - Colombia
- Adira subcincta (Mulsant, 1850) - Colombia
- Adira tomentosa (Mulsant, 1850) - Brazil, French Guiana
