= Adira =

Malaysian singer (born 1991)

Adira Suhaimi
- عديرة
- Born: Siti Adira binti Suhaimi; 19 September 1991 (age 35); Ranau, Sabah, Malaysia
- Occupations: Singer; Model; Businessperson; Spokesperson
- Years active: 2010–present
- Musical career
- Genres: Pop; Ballad; Soundtrack; R&B; Irama Malaysia
- Instrument: Vocals
- Labels: Astro Entertainment Sdn Bhd (AESB) (2010–present); Warner Music Malaysia (2011–present)

Siti Adira binti Suhaimi (born 19 September 1991) is a Malaysian singer. She was the runner-up of the eighth season of Astro's television reality program, Akademi Fantasia. She is also known as Queen of Soundtrack.

== Akademi Fantasia ==
At age 19, she auditioned for the Astro reality show, Akademi Fantasia, along with her sister, Ema. They managed to enter the show, becoming the first pair of siblings to enter Astro. However, on the second week, her sister was eliminated. She managed to remain in the show, throughout ten weeks, and in the finale, she resulted as a runner-up with 25.13% votes.

In the show's 8th season, Adira was the student that was never on the bottom two.

=== Song performances on Akademi Fantasia ===
Week	Instructed Songs	Original Artist	Result #
1	"Bertemu di Kalbu"	Jaclyn Victor	5
2	"Ku Percaya Ada Cinta"	Datuk Siti Nurhaliza	4
3	"Kini"	Feminin	1
4	"Biarlah"	Nidji	1
5	"Seri Mersing"	Sharifah Aini	4
6	"My All"	Mariah Carey	1
7	"Ayat-Ayat Cinta"	Rossa	1
8	"Kitalah Bintang"	Ella	1
9	"Mercy" "Dua"	Duffy; KRU	2
Finale	"Tiru Macam Saya" "Ku Ada Kamu"	Sheila Majid; Adira	Runner-up

== Post AF: Career ==
=== 2010–present: Ku Ada Kamu ===
Adira's coronation song "Ku Ada Kamu" was released as a promotional single via the compilation album "Hitz AF8", featuring songs by the contestants of Akademi Fantasia 8. The song was a massive hit in Malaysia, topping several radio charts, such as Carta Hot FM 30, Carta Muzik Muzik and Carta Suria FM. It became a top 5 hit in Carta Muzik FM and Carta Era, at No.2 and No.5. A music video of the song was released about a few days after the finale concert of the eighth season of Akademi Fantasia.

In December 2010, the song was announced as one of the songs that managed to enter the Anugerah Juara Lagu, a Malaysian annual award show to honour the best songs in the local entertainment industry. She performed the song on the award show, held on Stadium Bukit Jalil, Kuala Lumpur on 9 January 2011.

Following her success after Akademi Fantasia, Adira became the spokesperson for Innershine Pati Prun along with her sister, Ema. She made her acting debut in Lawaknya Fantasia Raya, a comedy television movie starring alongside Rozita Che Wan and Dato' Aziz Sattar.

In the same year, she sang the theme song of Astro Citra's "Dendam Kesuma", "Kesuma" and "Ilusi" which served as the theme song of the comedy series Awan Dania, in the third season, which is also Adira's favourite TV series. She also voiced the Malaysian versions of Spider-Man and The Adventures of Sharkboy and Lavagirl, as Mary Jane and Lavagirl, respectively.

== Filmography ==
=== Film ===
Year	Film	Role	Notes
2010	Spider-Man	Mary Jane	Voice over; Malaysian version
2010	The Adventures of Sharkboy and Lavagirl	Lavagirl	Voice-over; Malaysian version

=== Television ===
Year	Title	Role	Notes
2010	Akademi Fantasia Season 8	Herself	Reality programme; runner-up
2010	Dari Studio bersama Adira	Herself	Music show
2010	Lawaknya Fantasia Raya	Adira	Television movie; supporting role
2012	Tiara	Tiara	Television movie; main role with Singapore singer and actor Aliff Aziz
2012	Tanah Kubur (Season 4)	Hashima	with Malaysian actor Remy Ishak, Dira Abu Zahar
2024	Andartu Kosmopolitan	Cici	with Malaysian actor Aqasha, Fazura

== Discography ==
=== Studio albums ===
1. Dewi Cinta (2013)

=== Singles ===
List of singles, with selected chart positions, showing year released and album name
Year	Single	Peak chart positions				Album
Year	Single	Carta ERA 40	Hot FM 30	Muzik Muzik	Spotify/iTunes	Album
2010	"Ku Ada Kamu"	1	1	1	–	Hits AF8 and Dewi Cinta
2010	"Ilusi"	1	1	1	–	Dewi Cinta
2011	"Ombak Rindu (with Hafiz Suip)"	1	1	1	–	Ombak Rindu: Original Soundtrack and Dewi Cinta
2011	"Sakura"	1	1	1	–	Non-album single
2012	"Keajaiban Cinta (with Aliff Aziz)"	–	4	–	–	Dewi Cinta
2013	"Ratuku 2013 (with Awie)"	–	–	–	–	Sehangat Asmara: Original Soundtrack
2013	"Dewi Cinta"	–	–	1	–	Dewi Cinta
2014	"Ruhi Kasih"	–	–	–	–	Dewi Cinta
2015	"Hilang"	1	–	–	–	Dewi Cinta
2015	"Untuk Cinta (with Hafiz Suip)"	4	–	–	–	Pilot Cafe: Original Soundtrack
2015	"Kekasih Teragung Dunia"	–	–	–	–	Non-album single
2016	"Ku Mahu Pulang"	–	–	–	1	Non-album single
2016	"Dalam Kegelapan"	–	–	–	3	25 Rasul
2016	"Gempak Superstar"	–	–	–	–	Gempak Superstar
2017	"Sembunyi"	–	–	–	–	Non-album single
2018	"Pujaan Hati"	–	12	1	1	Pujaan Hari Kanda: Original Soundtrack

== Original Soundtrack (OST) ==
Her achievement so far is as a Singer of Malaysian film, drama or TV programs Soundtracks.

Year	Title	Film/Drama/TV Program	Duet	Notes	Ref.
2010	Kesuma	Dendam Kesuma	herself	A slot for 8 episodes drama "Suatu Ketika" in Astro Citra	
2010	Mari Menari	Mari Menari	with Hafiz	A dance reality entertainment program	
2011	Ilusi	Awan Dania (season 3)	herself	This song also the second single after Ku Ada Kamu	
2011	Saya Anak Malaysia	MyMusic Indiepretasi project	with various artist including Aizat and Hafiz	–	
2011	La La La	Elly & Epit	with Akim Ahmad	Comedy drama in Astro Ceria	
2011	Ombak Rindu	Ombak Rindu	with Hafiz	Malaysian Box Office film 2011/12	
2011	Lara Lagi	Ombak Rindu	herself	Second single in Ombak Rindu film	
2012	Merisik Khabar	Aku Sudirman – Suatu Interpretasi	herself	Her cover for the campaign	
2012	Juwita (Mana Hilangnya?)	Mana Hilangnya Juwita?	with Monoloque and Hazama	A Mysterious & controversy drama in Astro Ria	
2012	Cinta	Lagenda Budak Setan 2 : Katerina	herself	–	
2012	Keajaiban Cinta	Tiara	with Aliff Aziz	A TV series in which she played a main role	
2012	Raikan MAHA	MAHA International	herself	OST for Malaysia Agriculture, Horticulture & Agrotourism International (MAHA) campaign	
2012	Primadona	Primadona	herself	A talk show hosted by Erra Fazira, Rozita Che Wan, Ziela Jalil and Raja Azura	
2013	Erti Kawan	Memberku Hawa	herself	A drama in TV3 and Astro Ria	
2013	Ratuku (2013)	Sehangat Asmara	with Awie	Cover of Malaysian rock band, Wings's Ratuku	
2015	Untuk Cinta	Pilot Cafe	herself & with Hafiz	–	
2016	Ku Mahu Pulang	Inayah	herself	Soundtrack for Astro First	
2016	Dalam Kegelapan	25 Rasul	herself	25 Rasul: Kisah Nabi Yunus A.S	
2016	Gempak Superstar	Gempak Superstar	herself	–	
2017	Janjiku Padamu	The Promise	with Mark Adam	Soundtrack for Malaysian dubbing of Philippines television series, Pangako Sa'yo	
2017	Memilih Mencintaimu	'Soulmate' Hingga Jannah	with Taufik Batisah	–	
2019	Pujaan Hati	Pujaan Hati Kanda	herself	television series on TV3	
2020	Takdir Tercipta	Lelakimu Yang Dulu	with Hafiz	OST Slot Akasia (Lelakimu Yang Dulu)	
2020	Maaf		herself		
2021	Kesempatan Bagimu	Tercipta Satu Ikatan	herself	OST drama Tercipta Satu Ikatan)	

== Awards and nominations ==
=== Anugerah Industri Muzik ===
Year	Category	Nominated work	Result
2013	Best Pop Song	"Sekadar Mimpi"	Nominated
2013	Best Vocal Performance in Song (Female)	"Dewi Cinta"	Nominated
2014	Best Vocal Performance in Song (Female)	"Hilang"	Nominated
2014	Best Album Cover	Dewi Cinta	Nominated

=== Anugerah Juara Lagu ===
Year	Category	Nominated work	Result
2010	Finalist	"Ku Ada Kamu"	Nominated
2012	Finalist	"Ombak Rindu" (with Hafiz Suip)	Nominated

=== Anugerah Planet Muzik ===
Year	Category	Nominated work	Result
2012	Best Song	"Ombak Rindu" (with Hafiz Suip)	Nominated
2012	Most Popular Regional Songs	"Ombak Rindu" (with Hafiz Suip)	Nominated
2013	Best Collaboration	"Keajaiban Cinta" (with Aliff Aziz)	Nominated

=== Akademi Fantasia ===
Year	Category	Nominated work	Result
2010	Herself	Akademi Fantasia (season 8)	Second place

=== Anugerah Bintang Popular Berita Harian ===
Year	Category	Nominated work	Result
2010	Most Popular Female New Artist	Herself	Nominated
2010	Most Popular Female Singer	Herself	Nominated
2012	Most Popular Duo / Group Singer	Herself (with Hafiz Suip)	Nominated
2015	Most Popular Female Singer	Herself	Won
2016	Most Popular Female Singer	Herself	Won
2016	Most Popular Duo / Group Singer	Herself (with Hafiz Suip)	Nominated
2017	Sensational Artist	Herself	Nominated

=== Festival Filem Malaysia ===
Year	Category	Nominated work	Result
2012	Best Theme Songs	"Ombak Rindu" (with Hafiz Suip)	Won

=== Anugerah Skrin ===
Year	Category	Nominated work	Result
2012	Best Musical Program	Akustik: Adira	Nominated

=== Other Awards ===
Year	Award	Category	Nominated work	Result
2011	Anugerah Pilihan Pembaca Media Hiburan	Promising Award	Herself	Nominated
2012	Blockbuster Awards	Best Theme Song	Ombak Rindu (with Hafiz Suip)	Won
2013	Shout! Awards	Power Vocal Award	Herself	Nominated
2023	Pa&Ma Gala Award	10 Best Mama Millennial	Herself	Won
2026	The BrandLaureate Bumiputera BestBrands Award	BrandLeadershirp Award (Celebrity)	Herself	Won
