= Faizal Tahir =

Malaysian singer (born 1978)

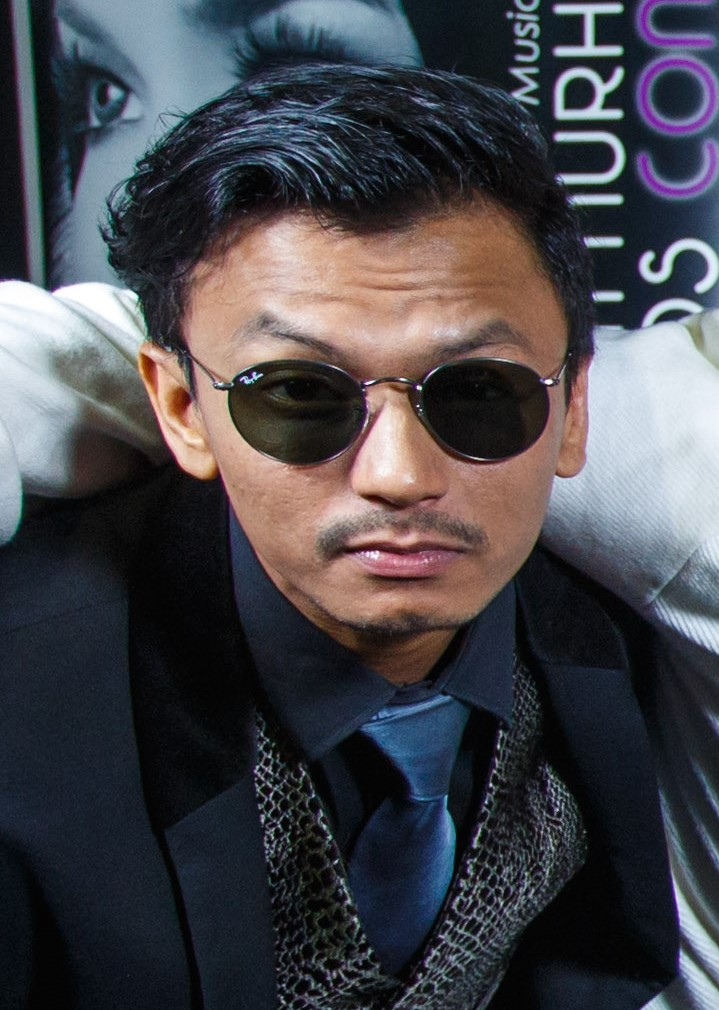
- Faizal in 2016

Background information
- Born: Ahmad Faizal bin Mohammad Tahir; 26 October 1978 (age 47); Kuala Lumpur, Malaysia
- Genres: Rock, Ballad, Pop
- Occupations: Singer-songwriter, composer, record producer, actor
- Years active: 2004–present
- Labels: Monkey Bone Records (2006–2013), Faithful Music (2014–present)

Ahmad Faizal bin Mohammad Tahir (born 26 October 1978) is a Malaysian singer-songwriter who shot to fame after becoming the first runner-up of the first season of One in a Million in 2006. He has won multiple Anugerah Industri Muzik awards (Malaysian equivalent to Grammy Awards), Anugerah Juara Lagu and Anugerah Planet Muzik awards. He runs a production studio named Faithful Music, home to young and rising artists such as Hanie Soraya, Aziz Harun, Harris Baba, Nastia Band, Aizat Amdan, Caliph Buskers and Hannah Delisha. He also runs a charity movement named IAMFAITHMEN whose objective is to support and spread positivity by giving back to the unfortunate.

== Personal life ==
Faizal Tahir is the second child of seven. One of his brothers, Anas Tahir, is a member of nasyid group, Firdaus, after leaving another nasyid group, Far East.

He studied at UiTM Shah Alam, from 2000 to 2003, and graduated with a diploma in Communication & Media Studies.

He is a former member of nasyid group, Mirwana. He is a singer and a composer. He built a mini studio named Home Suite Studio, located at Ukay Perdana, Ampang.

== One in a Million ==
Throughout the competition, Faizal sang:

- Chariot – Gavin DeGraw (Top 20)
- I Don't Wanna Be – Gavin DeGraw (Top 12)
- With A Little Help From My Friends – Joe Cocker (Top 10)
- Are You Gonna Be My Girl – Jet (Top 9)
- L.O.V.E.- Ashlee Simpson (Top 8)
- Warisan Wanita Terakhir – Teacher's Pet (Top 7)
- Elevation – U2 (Top 6)
- Superstition – Stevie Wonder (Top 6)
- Kenangan Terindah – Samsons (Top 3)
- Mahakarya Cinta – Original composition (Grand Finale)
- Medley of We Will Rock You, L.O.V.E. and I Don't Wanna Be – Queen, Ashlee Simpson and Gavin DeGraw (Grand Finale)

At the beginning of the grand finale show, Marion Caunter and Awal Ashaari informed Faizal that he was eliminated, but he was given another chance to perform for the grand prize. His first original single, Mahakarya Cinta, a song composed by Audi Mok, made its debut in the Grand Finale of One in a Million. He finished as runner-up to Suki Low. Faizal released a single, Kasih Tercipta, as part of the soundtrack for the local film Waris Jari Hantu. He was also named as the sole Malaysian spokesperson for DC Superheroes clothing, as he was famously noted for wearing T-shirts with the Superman logo throughout One in a Million. He also recorded "Gemuruh", the theme song for My Starz LG.

== Controversy ==
On 13 January 2008 Faizal created a controversy by removing his shirt to bare his chest and also his belt "live" on television during 8TV's fourth anniversary concert. 8TV's management took action by giving him strict warnings and requiring him to be involved in charity work for six months. In addition, two days after the incident 8TV held a press conference where Faizal apologized to all who were offended by the stunt. As a result, on 19 January, the Malaysian Communications and Multimedia Commission (MCMC) stated that it would ban him from appearing on television for three months, and also bar 8TV from airing live or tape-delayed entertainment programmes throughout the same period, effective 15 January. Days after the end of the ban, the Mufti of Perlis, Dato' Dr. Asri Zainul Abidin, issued a grievance to TV3 against having Faizal perform at the Konsert Jom Heboh, which was held in the first weekend of May.

== Filmography ==
=== Film ===
Year	Title	Role	Notes
2010	Lu Pikirlah Sendiri de Movie	Himself	Cameo appearance
2024	Pendekar Awang: Darah Indera Gajah	Utusan To' Ku Paloh	Special appearance

=== Television ===
Year	Program	Role	Notes
2018	I Can See Your Voice Malaysia	Himself	Guest artist, season 1

== Discography ==
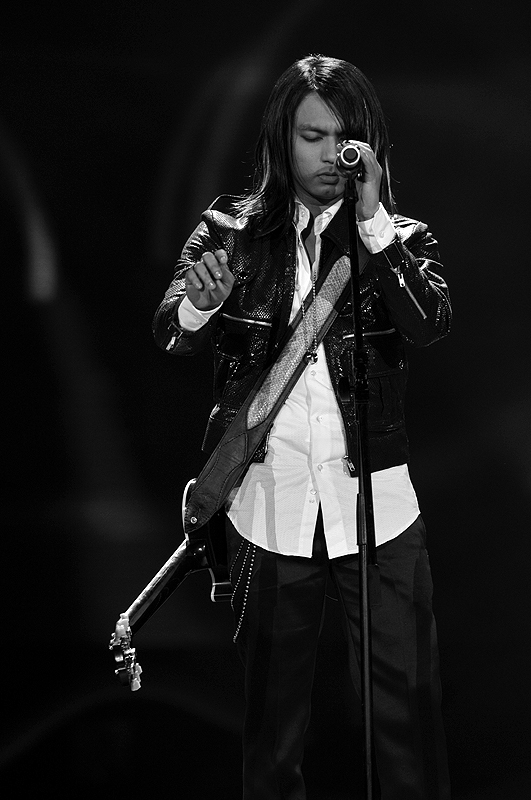
Faizal at the 23rd Anugerah Juara Lagu at Stadium Putra Bukit Jalil on 18 January 2009

=== Studio albums ===
Album Information	Track list
Aku.Muzik.Kamu: Release Date: 22 November 2007; Format: CD; Label: Monkey Bone Records	Track list: 1. Invitation; 2. Batu & Golek; 3. Kerna Kamu; 4. Aku Punya Kamu; 5. Sempurna; 6. Cuba; 7. Sampai Syurga; 8. La Da Di Dum; 9. Mungkin Ku Tak Bisa; 10. Mestikah Ada Yang Lain; 11. Mahakarya Cinta (Orchestra Version); 12. Sampai Syurga (Acoustic Version); 13. Gemuruh; 14. Mahakarya Cinta
Adrenalin: Release Date: 31 Januari 2010; Format: CD, Digital Download; Label: Monkey Bone Records	Track list: 1. Adrenalin; 2. Superhero; 3. Selamat Malam; 4. Karma; 5. Hanyut; 6. Bencinta; 7. Hanyut (Acoustic Version); 8. Semesta
Faizal Tahir: Release Date: 31 March 2013; Format: CD, Digital Download; Label: Monkey Bone Records	Track list: 1. Vortex; 2. Bintang; 3. Biar; 4. Selalu; 5. Halusinasi; 6. 7; 7. Permaisuri; 8. Buta; 9. Mati; 10. Anti Graviti
Anatomi: Release Date: 4 November 2016; Format: CD, Digital Download; Label: Warner Music Malaysia	Track list: 1. Assalamualaikum; 2. Suriram; 3. Sejati; 4. Menang; 5. Bukan Yang Pertama; 6. Sayang; 7. Setia; 8. Dirgahayu; 9. Negaraku; 10. Assalamualaikum (ABPBH 2014); 11. Assalamualaikum AJL 30; 12. Assalamualaikum (Acoustic)
Rojak: Release Date: 2 August 2019; Format: CD, Digital Download; Label: Faithful Music, Warner Music Malaysia	Track list: 1. Ragaman; 2. Ratu; 3. Starfeather; 4. Kamu; 5. Bisa Aja; 6. Malaysia; 7. This is Anfield; 8. Until We Meet Again; 9. Fire & Water; 10. Starfeather (Live from Aceh); 11. Ratu (Piano Demo); 12. Bisa Aja (Live from Tokyo); 13. Anney, Rojak Satu!

=== Singles ===
==== As lead singer ====
Year	Title	Album
2007	"Batu & Golek"	Aku.Muzik.Kamu
2007	"Mahakarya Cinta"	Aku.Muzik.Kamu
2007	"Gemuruh"	Aku.Muzik.Kamu
2008	"Cuba"	Aku.Muzik.Kamu
2008	"Sampai Syurga"	Aku.Muzik.Kamu
2009	"Bencinta"	Adrenalin
2009	"Selamat Malam"	Adrenalin
2010	"Adrenalin"	Adrenalin
2010	"Hanyut"	Adrenalin
2011	"Karma"	Adrenalin
2012	"Antigraviti"	Faizal Tahir
2012	"Buta"	Faizal Tahir
2013	"Biar"	Faizal Tahir
2013	"Vortex"	Faizal Tahir
2014	"Faith" (feat. Jaclyn Victor)	Non-album singles
2014	"Assalamualaikum"	Anatomi
2015	"Sayang"	Anatomi
2016	"Sejati"	Anatomi
2016	"Dirgahayu" (with Siti Nurhaliza)	Anatomi
2016	"Negaraku" (with Joe Flizzow, Altimet and SonaOne)	Anatomi
2017	"Bukan Yang Pertama"	Anatomi
2017	"Menang"	Anatomi
2018	"Malaysia"	Rojak
2018	"Starfeather"	Rojak
2018	"Ragaman"	Rojak
2019	"Bisa Aja"	Rojak
2019	"Bikers Kental" (with Akim Ahmad)	Non-album singles
2019	"Ratu"	Rojak
2019	"Fire & Water"	Rojak
2020	"X Missing U" (with Dayang Nurfaizah, Yonnyboii and Tuju)	Non-album singles
2020	"Make It Through" (with Zee Avi)	Non-album singles
2020	"Sumandak"	Non-album singles
2020	"Kamu"	Non-album singles
2020	"Sad To Cry"	Non-album singles
2020	"Nobody"	Non-album singles
2020	"Empat Dara 2020" (with Elly Mazlein and Zizi Kirana)	Non-album singles
2021	"Luka Hati" (with Alan D)	Non-album singles
2021	"Aku Tanpa CintaMu 2021" (with Mirwana)	Qibla
2021	"Syahadah"	Qibla
2021	"Menang Bersama"	ORTM Raikan Merdeka
2022	"Alah Bisa" (with Amira Othman)	Non-album singles
2022	"Pandang Pandang, Jeling Jeling" (with Amira Othman)	Non-album singles
2022	"Santai"	Non-album singles
2023	"Jodoh Ajal Rezeki" (with Neelofa and Haris Ismail)	Non-album singles

==== Guest singles ====
Year	Title	Artist
2015	"Inspirasi"	Hafiz Suip
2015	"Setia"	Elizabeth Tan
2018	"Buta"	Caliph Buskers
2020	"Payung Terjun"	FML
2024	"Campak Bintang"	Dato' M. Nasir
2024	"Perjuangan Takkan Tamat" (OST MLBB M6 World Championship)	Mobile Legends: Bang Bang

== Awards and nominations ==
=== Anugerah Industri Muzik Malaysia (AIM) ===
Year	Category	Nominated Work	Album / Material	Result
2008 (AIM15)	Best New Artist	Faizal Tahir		Won
2008 (AIM15)	Best Vocal Performance in an Album (Male)		Aku.Muzik.Kamu	Won
2008 (AIM15)	Best Engineered Album		Aku.Muzik.Kamu	Nominated
2008 (AIM15)	Best Rock Album		Aku.Muzik.Kamu	Won
2008 (AIM15)	Best Musical Arrangement in a Song (Non-Malay)	La Da Di Dum	Aku.Muzik.Kamu	Nominated
2008 (AIM15)	Best Song	Mahakarya Cinta	Aku.Muzik.Kamu	Nominated
2008 (AIM15)	Best Album		Aku.Muzik.Kamu	Won
2009 (AIM16)	Best Music Video	Sampai Syurga	Aku.Muzik.Kamu	Nominated
2010 (AIM17)	Best Vocal Performance in a Song (Male)	Bencinta	Adrenalin	Nominated
2010 (AIM17)	Best Rock Song	Bencinta	Adrenalin	Nominated
2010 (AIM17)	Best Rock Album		Adrenalin	Won
2010 (AIM17)	Best Album		Adrenalin	Won
2011 (AIM18)	Best Music Video	Karma	Adrenalin	Nominated
2012 (AIM19)	Best Vocal Performance in a Song (Male)	Buta	Faizal Tahir	Nominated
2012 (AIM19)	Best Rock Song	Buta	Faizal Tahir	Nominated
2013 (AIM20)	Best Vocal Performance in a Song (Male)	Biar	Faizal Tahir	Nominated
2013 (AIM20)	Best Rock Song	Vortex	Faizal Tahir	Nominated
2013 (AIM20)	Best Album Cover		Faizal Tahir	Nominated
2014–2016 (AIM22)	Best Vocal Performance in a Song (Duo/Collaboration)	Setia (featured by Elizabeth Tan)	Anatomi	Nominated
2014–2016 (AIM22)	Best Selling Ringtone	Setia (featured by Elizabeth Tan)	Anatomi	Won
2014–2016 (AIM22)	Best Vocal Performance in a Song (Male)	Sejati	Anatomi	Nominated
2014–2016 (AIM22)	Best Song	Sejati	Anatomi	Won
2014–2016 (AIM22)	Best Pop Song	Sejati	Anatomi	Won
2014–2016 (AIM22)	Best Pop Song	Assalamualaikum	Anatomi	Nominated
2014–2016 (AIM22)	Best Musical Arrangement in a Song	Assalamualaikum	Anatomi	Nominated

=== Anugerah Juara Lagu (AJL) ===
Year	Song	Album	Composer	Lyricist	Category	Result
2007 (AJL 22)	Kasih Tercipta	OST – Waris Jari Hantu	Ajai	Shuhaimi Baba	Ballad	Nominated
2007 (AJL 22)	Mahakarya Cinta	Aku.Muzik.Kamu	Audi Mok	Mohd Shariza Shamsiri	Ballad	Nominated
2008 (AJL 23)	Cuba	Aku.Muzik.Kamu	Audi Mok	Faizal Tahir	Ballad	Nominated
2008 (AJL 23)	Sampai Syurga	Aku.Muzik.Kamu	Audi Mok	Faizal Tahir	Ballad	Won
2008 (AJL 23)	Sampai Syurga	Aku.Muzik.Kamu	Audi Mok	Faizal Tahir	Best Vocal	Won
2008 (AJL 23)	Sampai Syurga	Aku.Muzik.Kamu	Audi Mok	Faizal Tahir	Best Performance	Won
2009 (AJL 24)	Bencinta	Adrenalin	Audi Mok	Faizal Tahir	Open	Won: 3rd Place
2010 (AJL 25)	Selamat Malam	Adrenalin	Audi Mok	Faizal Tahir	Open	Nominated
2010 (AJL 25)	Hanyut	Adrenalin	Audi Mok	Faizal Tahir	Open	Nominated
2010 (AJL 25)	Hanyut	Adrenalin	Audi Mok	Faizal Tahir	Best Performance	Won
2011 (AJL 26)	Karma	Adrenalin	Audi Mok	Faizal Tahir	Open	Won: 3rd place
2015 (AJL 30)	Assalamualaikum		Audi Mok, Ezra Kong, Mike Chan, Omar K, Faizal Tahir	Audi Mok, Ezra Kong, Mike Chan, Omar K, Faizal Tahir	Open	Won: 2nd place

=== Anugerah Planet Muzik ===
Year	Category	Nominated work	Album	Result	Lost To
2008	Best New Male Artist		Aku.Muzik.Kamu	Won	
2008	Most Popular Male Artist			Won	
2009	Malaysia's Most Popular Artist			Nominated	Siti Nurhaliza
2009	Regional Most Popular Artist			Nominated	Siti Nurhaliza
2011	Best Male Artist		Adrenalin	Won	
2011	Malaysia's Best Song	Hanyut	Adrenalin	Nominated	Hafiz Suip – Awan Nano
2011	Regional Most Popular Artist			Nominated	Siti Nurhaliza
2015	Best Male Artist			Nominated	Judika
2015	Malaysia's Best Song	Assalamualaikum		Won	
2015	Best Song	Assalamualaikum		Won	
2016	Best Collaboration (Song)	Beautiful (with Aziz Harun)		Won	
2016	Best Collaboration (Song)	Katakan (with Harris Baba)		Nominated	
2016	Best Male Artist	Sayang		Nominated	
2016	Best Song (Malaysia)	Sayang		Nominated	
2016	Best Song (Malaysia)	Setia (with Elizabeth Tan)		Nominated	
2016	Best Duo / Group	Setia (with Elizabeth Tan)		Nominated	
2016	APM Most Popular Song	Setia (with Elizabeth Tan)		Nominated	

=== Anugerah Bintang Popular Berita Harian (ABPBH) ===
Year	Category	Result
2008	Popular TV Host (Male)	Nominated
2009	Popular Singer (Male)	Nominated
2010	Popular Singer (Male)	Won
2011	Popular Singer (Male)	Nominated
2012	Popular Singer (Male)	Nominated

=== SHOUT! Awards ===
Year	Category	Result	Lost to
2009	Hot Guy Award	Won	
2009	Stylo Award	Nominated	Dynas Mokhtar
2010	Rockstar Award	Nominated	Bunkface
2010	Power Vocal Award	Won	
2010	Hot Guy Award	Nominated	Henry Golding

=== MTV Europe Music Awards ===
Year	Nominee/work	Award	Result	Ref.
2015	Faizal Tahir	Best Southeast Asian Act	Nominated	
2017	Faizal Tahir	Best Southeast Asian Act	Nominated	
