= Francissca Peter =

Malaysian musician (born 1961)

Yang Hormat Dato' Francissca Peter DIMP
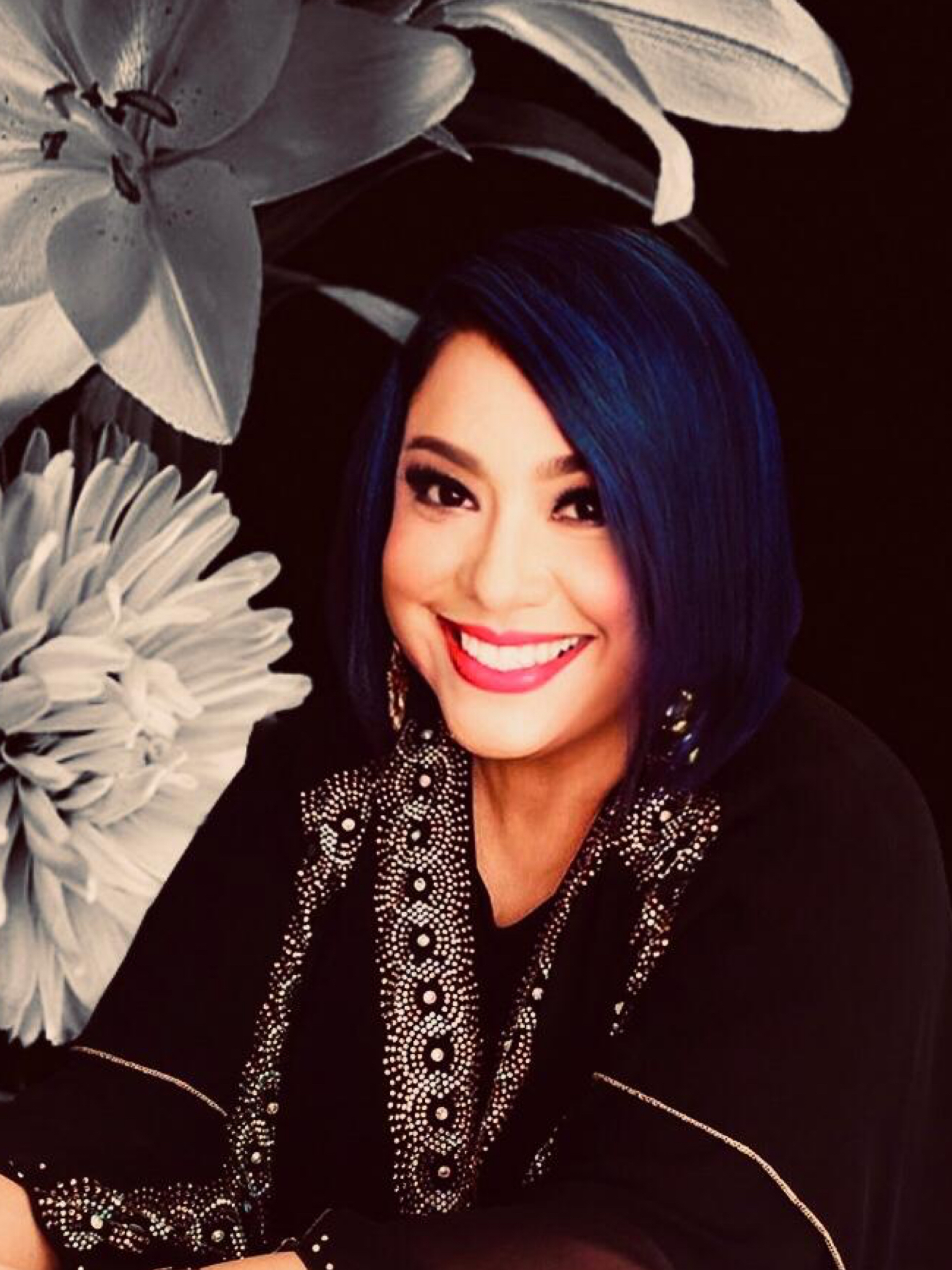
- Francissca Peter in 2019

Background information
- Also known as: Francissca Peter; Fran
- Born: Luciana Francissca Lucian Gabriel Peter; 6 September 1961 (age 65); Ipoh, Perak; Federation of Malaya (now Malaysia)
- Genres: Pop; dance; jazz
- Occupations: Singer; songwriter; actress
- Instrument: Vocalist
- Years active: 1979–2025
- Labels: Independent; Warner Music Group; WEA; Scat; Inderoc; EMI

Dato' Luciana Francissca Lucian Gabriel Peter, DIMP, also known as Fran (born 6 September 1961), is a former Malaysian actress and singer-songwriter.

== Early life and background ==
Francissca was born in Malaysia of Ceylonese (Sri Lankan/Scottish) and Chinese heritage, to parents Alice Peter and Lucian G. Peter (embraced Islam in 2007 and changed his name to Muhammad Gaberial Peter Abdullah). She is the second of four siblings. Her father was an ex British soldier in the army during the Malaya colonial era, teaching English grammar to British soldiers. He then went on to be one of the first Reuters and Bernama correspondents, later joining the New Straits Times and then starting a new newspaper of his own, The Straits Echo. He turned to alcoholism due to stress and his anti-establishment views, which led him to abandoning his family in 1978. Francissca's mother had to raise Francissca and her siblings single-handedly with help from a number of people, as well as the Canossian Nuns.

Despite being born in Klang, Selangor, Fran spent most of her childhood in Ipoh, Perak. She attended Main Convent Ipoh and then Tarcisian Convent Ipoh. The family moved to Petaling Jaya permanently in 1982 and she was enrolled at a co-ed school in Selayang. Fran left school after Form Three, took up a typewriting course, and started working as a salesgirl/rep in a batik factory and tourist shop to help support her family. A year later, with money being tight, she took the decision to go into singing. She and her mother scoured the newspapers together, searching for agents who would help Fran secure a singing job.

After her marriage, Fran moved overseas, first to the US, then UK, and China (Guangzhou and Hong Kong), in the 1990s, before relocating back to Malaysia in 2001.

== Career ==
In 1987, she was the first Malaysian artist to win the international award for Best Song at the Asean Song Festival held in Kuala Lumpur, Malaysia. She is also known nationwide for her rendition of Malaysia's second national anthem Setia.

In 1987, her album Kau Bintangku was almost banned, as the album cover had her wearing a crucifix. Warner Music digitally edited the album cover and put it back on the shelves.

In 2007, she was the lead soloist in the "Musical SPEX – A Spiritual Journey" held outdoors at night in Malacca. Also in the same year, Warner Music Malaysia released a double compilation CD album titled Berlian containing her 19 popular hits and 1 new song in 2007. Warner also released two other compilation albums in 2008, one in March 2008 titled Nostalgia Abadi (Forever Nostalgic) and another in 2009 titled Memori Hit (Hit Memories). Keunggulan Francissca Peter (The Very Best of Francissca Peter), a 37-song compilation album, was released in late January 2010.

=== Keunggulan 33 Tahun Francissca Peter Concert ===
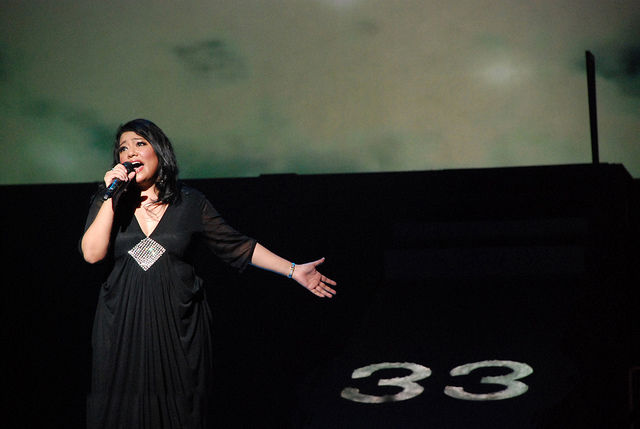
Fran performing at her Keunggulan 33 Tahun Concert at Panggung Sari, Istana Budaya, Kuala Lumpur

On 4–6 February 2011, in conjunction with her 33 years in the Malaysian music industry, Fran held her first solo concert "Keunggulan 33 Tahun Francissca Peter" concert at The Panggung Sari, Istana Budaya. Being the most successful non-Malay female entertainer in the local music industry, Fran was given the honour of being the first non-Malay entertainer ever to perform a solo concert at the prestigious Istana Budaya. It was a sold-out, 3-night concert with Fran performing 33 songs each night with a 33-piece orchestra. Fran received a standing ovation on all three nights, and rave reviews in the local dailies and alternative media.

Consequently, in March 2011, Warner Music Malaysia released a box set of all her albums nationally, totalling 10 CDs (except for the Masih Merindu album which was under an independent label). Also included in the Box Set was a new single Tiada Gementar Lagi recorded specially for her fans as a thank you for the years of love and support given to her for the "Konsert Keunggulan 33 Tahun" (February 2011).

== Charity work ==
She is known as the Fundraising Queen in Malaysia. In 2013, she released the album The Love & Hope consisting of 11 songs. Funds raised from the sale of this album went to the World Vision Child Development Fund to help impoverished children.

== Awards ==
On 8 March 2011, Fran was chosen as one of The Most Inspiring Women in Malaysia by The Star.

== Honour ==
- Pahang
  - Knight Companion of the Order of the Crown of Pahang (DIMP) – Dato' (2022)

== Personal life ==
In 2009, she filed for separation in her marriage, which she announced at the Keunggulan Concert 33 Years Francissca Peter in 2011.

== Discography ==
=== Solo albums ===
- 1984: Komputer Muzik
- 1985: Aku Hanya Pendatang
- 1986: Sekadar Di Pinggiran
- 1987: Kau Bintangku
- 1988: Harapan
- 1989: Pasti Kembali
- 1989: Now's the Time
- 1992: Mawar Terpinggir
- 1996: Setinggi Angkasa
- 2004: Masih Merindu

=== Duet albums with Royston Sta Maria ===
- 1982: Siapa Dia Sebelum Daku
- 1982: Bersama Pertemuan Ini

=== Compilation albums ===
- 1990: Suara Rindu
- 1994: Siri Legenda
- 1997: 10 Tahun Gemilang
- 1999: Alunan Mesra
- 2000: Every Journey Travelled
- 2002: A Christmas Gift
- 2007: Dulu, Kini dan Selamanya
- 2008: Berlian
- 2008: Memori Hit Roy & Fran
- 2009: Nostalgia Abadi
- 2009: Memori Hit Francissca Peter
- 2010: Cinta 101
- 2010: Keunggulan
- 2010: Sukma Rindu
- 2011: Keunggulan 33 Tahun Francissca Peter (10-CD Box Set)
- 2011: Kenangan Abadi
- 2011: DIA (mix compilation with Fauziah Latiff)
- 2011: The Boxset of ten albums a special edition in conjunction with her big Concert
- 2012: Bintang Lagenda (mix compilation various artist- Francissca Peter, Jamal Abdillah, Ramli Sarip, Khadijah Ibrahim)
- 2012: 101 Francissca
- 2013: The Love and Hope Album

==== Singles ====
- "To Know Malaysia Is To Love Malaysia" (Carol O Connors – for Tourism Malaysia)
- "Reach For The Sky" (Goh Boon Ho – for the 1988's SEA Games)
- "Setia" ('RTM 2nd National Anthem)
- "Your Love" (Michael Winans USA)
- "You Are" (Brian Simpson USA)
- "Liberian Girl" (Duet with Jazz Saxophonist : Cal Bennett, USA – album Local Hero)
- "I Love You Still" (Manan Ngah)
- "Janji Kekasih" (Fauzi Marzuki)
- "Begitulah Aku" (Manan Ngah)
- "Tomorrow"
- "1 AIA – The Power Of We"
- "Tiada Gementar Lagi"
- "It Starts With Me"
- "Open The World"

=== Compositions ===
List of compositions & lyrics by Francissca Peter

Year	Song title	Album	Label / Copyright	Composed by	Lyrics by
1982	Saat Manis	"Bersama Pertemuan Ini"	EMI Malaysia	Francissca Peter	–
1984	Ku Menari Untukmu	"Komputer Muzik"	Warner Music Malaysia	–	Francissca Peter
1984	Rahsia Hatiku	"Komputer Muzik"	Warner Music Malaysia	–	Francissca Peter
1984	Kejadian Ini	"Komputer Muzik"	Warner Music Malaysia	–	Francissca Peter
1989	Now's The Time	"Now's the Time"	Warner Music Malaysia	–	Francissca Peter, Michael Veerapen & Susan Goh
1989	Going Crazy	"Now's the Time"	Warner Music Malaysia	–	Francissca Peter & Michael Veerapen
1993	Desire	"Mawar Terpinggir"	Warner Music Malaysia	Francissca & Bibiana Peter; Fauzi Marzuki	Francissca & Bibiana Peter
1996	Kehidupan Ini	"Setinggi Angkasa"	EMI Malaysia	Francissca Peter	–
1996	Kini Tiada Lagi	"Setinggi Angkasa"	EMI Malaysia	Francissca Peter	Francissca Peter & Fauzi Marzuki
1996	Ku Pohon Kemaafan	"Setinggi Angkasa"	EMI Malaysia	Francissca Peter	
1996	Cinta Di Musim Bunga	"Setinggi Angkasa"	EMI Malaysia	–	Bibiana & Francissca Peter; Tessh R S
2003	Ke Udara Kembali	"Masih Merindu"	BMG Publishing	–	Francissca Peter & Julfekar
2003	Dihukum Cinta	"Masih Merindu"	Millenium Art Sdn Bhd	Francissca Peter	–
2003	Tak Pernah Cinta	"Masih Merindu"	Millenium Art Sdn Bhd	Francissca Peter	–
2003	Suatu Saat Dulu	"Masih Merindu"	Millenium Art Sdn Bhd	Francissca Peter & Julfekar	
2007	Tomorrow (World Vision Malaysia theme song)	"Single"	–		Francissca & Bibiana Peter
2009	The Power of We "One AIA" (rebranding AIA Berhad theme song)	"Single"	–	Francissca & Bibiana Peter; Leonard Yeap	Bibiana & Francissca Peter
2011	Tiada Gementar Lagi	"Keunggulan 33 Tahun Francissca Peter"	–	Imran Ajmain & Francissca Peter	–
2012	It Starts With Me	"Songs Of Change (15th Anniversary World Vision Malaysia)"	–	Francissca & Bibiana Peter, Leonard Yeap, David Kien Lim	Francissca & Bibiana Peter
