= List of Malaysian singers =

This is a list of notable singers from Malaysia.

== A ==
- Adibah Noor
- Adira
- Aina Abdul
- Afdlin Shauki
- Ah Niu
- Ahmad Zamil
- Aiman Hakim Ridza
- Aisha Retno
- Aizat Amdan
- Alif Satar
- Altimet
- Alvin Anthons
- Amy Mastura
- Angelica Lee
- Angeline Khoo
- Anuar Zain
- Aril AF7
- Armando Chin Yong
- Ash Nair
- Awie
- Ayda Jebat
- Azean Irdawaty
- Azmyl Yunor
- Aznil Nawawi
- Amira Othman
- Azzam Sham
- Afieq Shazwan
- Ariel Fesol
- Araff
- Afiq Sky
- Apich Lo
- Awienit
- Ashmirul
- Ayunie Rizal
- Auddra Zulkifli
- Anas Ridzuan

== B ==
- Bell Yu Tian
- Betty Banafe
- Ben Ladin

== C ==
- Camelia
- Cass Chin
- Chan Kwok Fai
- Crystal Ong

== D ==
- Danial Chuer
- Daniel Lee Chee Hun
- Daniel Sher
- David Arumugam
- Dayang Nurfaizah
- Dewi Liana Seriestha
- DIOR (singer)

== E ==
- Ernie Zakri
- Ella
- Eric Moo
- Erra Fazira
- Esther Applunius
- Ezly Syazwan

== F ==
- Fairuz Hussein
- Faizal Tahir
- Faradina Mohd. Nadzir
- Farah Asyikin Zulkifli
- Fauziah Latiff
- Fish Leong
- Four Golden Princess
- Francissca Peter
- Freya Lim
- Fattah Amin
- Fimie Don
- Faa Zaini
- Firdaus Ghufran
- Firdhaus Farmizi

== G ==
- Gary Chaw
- Gordon Teoh

== H ==
- Hafiz Suip
- Hafidz Roshdi
- Hannah Tan
- Helen Savari
- Hunny Madu
- Haqiem Rusli
- Harris Alif
- Hazama Azmi
- Hael Husaini

== I ==
- Imee Ooi
- Irene Savaree
- Izwan Pilus
- Iqram Dinzly

== J ==
- Jaclyn Victor
- Jamal Abdillah
- Janna Nick
- Jason Lo
- Jess Lee
- Jessie Chung
- Juwita Suwito
- Jannah Izwandy

== K ==
- Kaer Azami
- Karen Kong

== L ==
- Liyana Jasmay
- Liza Hanim
- Loganathan Arumugam

== M ==
- M-Girls
- Marsha Milan Londoh
- Mawi
- Mimifly
- Maya Karin
- Meeia Foo
- Meor Aziddin Yusof
- Michael Wong
- Mizz Nina
- MK K-Clique
- Mohd Taufik Nordin

== N ==
- Najwa Latif
- Nana
- Nicholas Teo
- Nikki
- Nina Nadira Naharuddin
- Ning Baizura
- Noraniza Idris
- Noh Salleh
- Nelissa Nizam
- Naim Daniel

== P ==
- Penny Tai
- Pete Teo
- Prema
- Prema Yin
- Puteri Khareeza

== Q ==
- Queenz Cheng
- Quincy Tan
- Que

== R ==
- Race Wong
- Radhi-O
- Resh
- Remy Ishak
- Riz
- Ronnie Pereira
- Rosanne Wong
- Rosiah Chik
- Rynn Lim
- Ray-D

== S ==
- Salmah Ismail
- Sandra Dianne
- Sarimah Ibrahim
- Sean Ghazi
- Shah Indrawan Ismail
- Shahir
- Shake
- Shanon Shah
- Sharifah Aini
- Sheila Majid
- Shi Xin Hui
- Shila Amzah
- SingleTrackMind
- Siti Nurhaliza
- Soo Wincci
- Stacy
- Stella Chung
- Sudirman Arshad
- Suki Low

== T ==
- Tiz Zaqyah
- Thalita Shuib
- Tajul Ariff

== U ==
- Umie Aida

== V ==
- Victor Wong
- Vince Chong

== W ==
- Wani Kayrie
- Wany Hasrita
- Wan Shahjuddin

== X ==
- Xin Yan

== Y ==
- Yi Jet Qi
- Yuna

== Z ==
- Zaharah Agus
- Zee Avi
- Ziana Zain
- Zali Rusli
- Zuhnun Maarof

== See also ==
- Music of Malaysia
