= David Knight =

David or Dave Knight may refer to:

- David Knight (American football) (born 1951), former American football player
- David Knight (CND), chair for the Campaign for Nuclear Disarmament 1996–2001
- David Knight (cricketer) (born 1956), Australian cricketer
- David Knight (English footballer) (born 1987), English footballer
- David Knight (motorcyclist) (born 1978), enduro rider from the Isle of Man
- David Knight (musician) (born 1978), American singer and music composer
- David Knight (politician) (born 1969), state representative in the U.S. state of Georgia
- David L. Knight (1950–2007), state representative in the U.S. state of New Hampshire
- David M. Knight (1936–2018), English professor of history and philosophy of science
- Dave Knight, American slalom canoeist
- Dave Knight (baseball), American baseball player
- Dave Simpson (soccer) (born 1983), David Simpson Knight, Canadian soccer player
- Tuffy Knight (born 1936), David "Tuffy" Knight, Canadian football coach
- Starman (David Knight), comic book character

== See also ==
- David Knights (born 1945), English musician
