= Golden Princess =

Golden Princess may refer to:

- Golden Princess (ship), one of several ships
- Golden Princess (2020 film), a Burmese drama film
- Golden Princess Film Production, a Hong Kong film production company
- The Golden Princess, a 1925 American silent drama film

== See also ==
- Four Golden Princess, a China-based Malaysian musical group
