= Be Like Water (song) =

2026 single by Siti Nurhaliza and Firdhaus Farmizi

Single by Siti Nurhaliza and Firdhaus Farmizi
- Language: Chinese
- Released: June 30, 2026
- Recorded: 2026
- Studio: Cranky Music Studio; Little Bad Studio
- Genre: Mandopop
- Length: 3:08
- Label: SN Legacy, Universal Music
- Songwriter: Firdhaus Farmizi
- Producer: Aubrey Suwito

Siti Nurhaliza singles chronology
"Kesuma" (2026)	"Be Like Water" (2026)

Music video
- "Be Like Water" on YouTube

"Be Like Water" (Chinese: 像水一樣; pinyin: Xiàng shuǐ yí yàng) is a single by Malaysian artists Siti Nurhaliza and Firdhaus Farmizi. Entirely composed by Firdhaus, "Be Like Water" was released and launched along with its music video on June 30, 2026. The single also serves as Cuckoo Malaysia's official theme song for their corporate social responsibility initiative, "Cuckoo Loves, Cares" project. Its music video, directed by Jasmine Wong, was shot and recorded at Petronas Philharmonic Hall.

Drawing inspiration from Bruce Lee's "Be Water" philosophy, the lyrics describe love as a quiet yet powerful force capable of bringing about profound change without the need for grand displays. The song was performed live for the first time during the launch of Cuckoo Malaysia's "Cuckoo Loves, Cares" project on June 30, 2026.

== Background and development ==
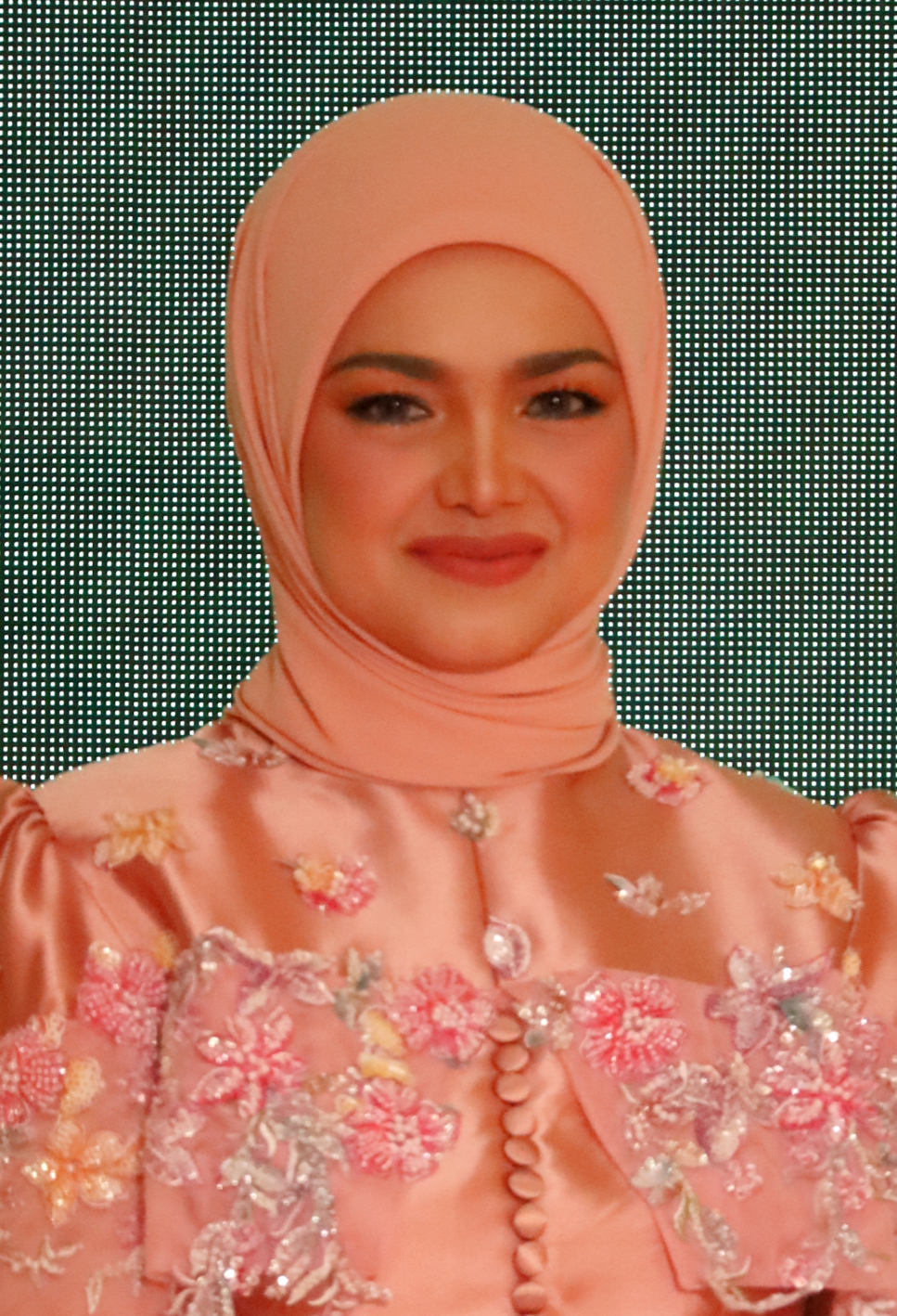
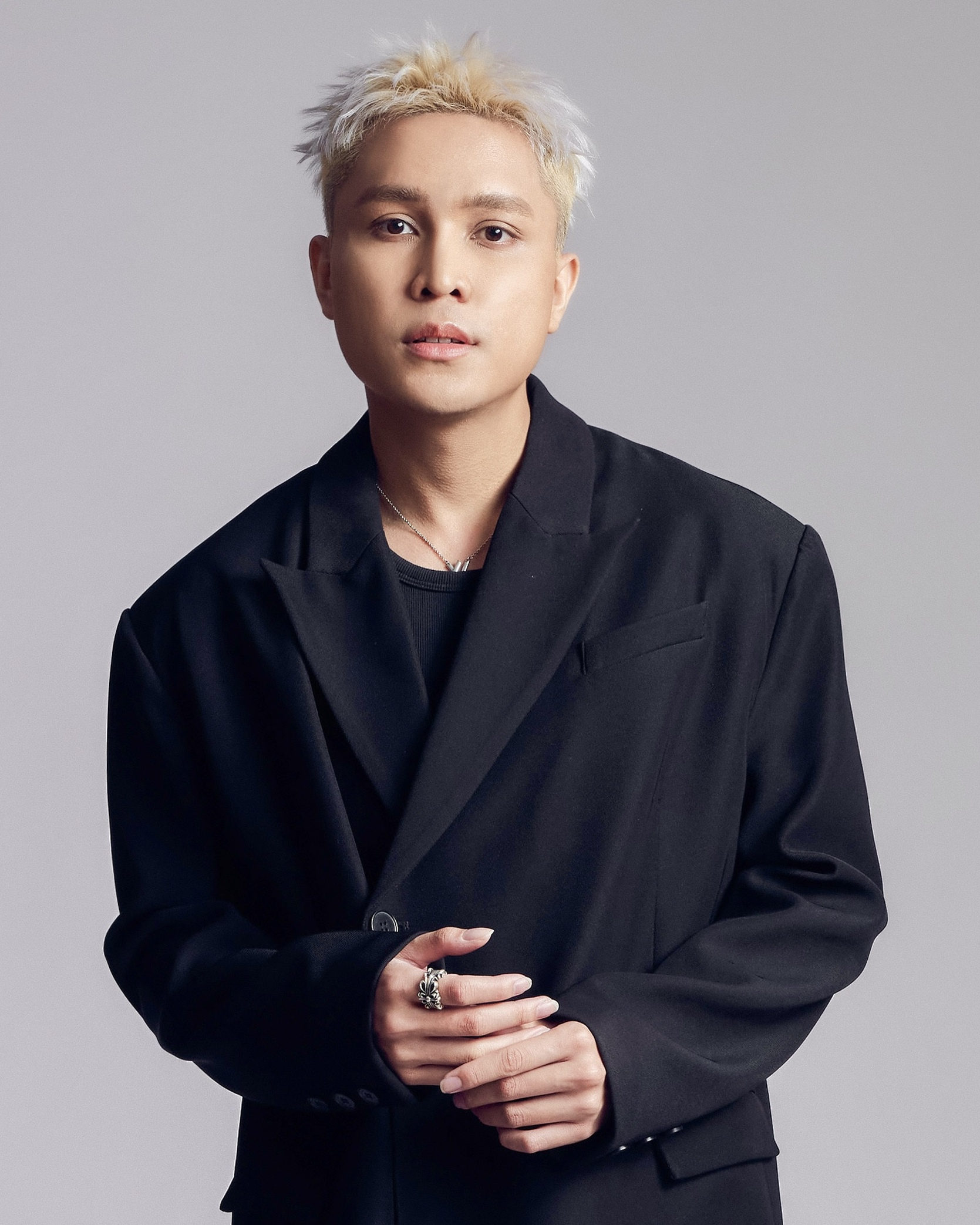
"Be Like Water" marked the first time for Siti Nurhaliza and Firdhaus Farmizi (right) to record a song together.

Siti has recorded and performed Chinese songs live on multiple occasions throughout her career, despite being a Malaysian Malay. (Note: Siti was born in Kuala Lipis, Pahang, Malaysia.) She had recorded a bilingual duet with Malaysian Chinese singer Ciang Teng, "Rindu di Antara Kita", for her sophomore album, Siti Nurhaliza II, released in 1997. In 1999, she recorded "心愿" ("Wish") with her then-labelmate, Candy Cheah. The song was included on Cheah's debut album, 襪子 (Socks). She also recorded covers of two Chinese songs, "月亮代表我的心" ("The Moon Represents My Heart") and "征服" ("Conquer"), which were included on her special 2004 album with Samsung.

She had also performed Chinese songs live at multiple major events, including "Conquer" and a duet with Wang Leehom on "The Moon Represents My Heart" at the 15th Golden Melody Awards in 2004. In April 2025, she performed "The Moon Represents My Heart" during Chinese President Xi Jinping's state visit to Malaysia.

Firdhaus is of Malaysian Malay descent too, however, he is primarily known for his Mandopop songs. (Note: Firdhaus was born in Kulai, Johor, Malaysia.) Siti briefly met Firdhaus at Cuckoo Malaysia's Cuckootopia Music Fest in 2024. (Note: While the event's name is referred to as Cuckootopia in 2026, the full event name is actually "Cuckootopia Music Fest".) Hoe Kian Choon (KC Hoe), founder and CEO of Cuckoo International (Malaysia), had been encouraging and facilitating a collaboration between the two artists since they first met. After returning from his volunteer work in Tanzania, Firdhaus was moved and inspired to compose "Be Like Water". He commented, "For us, having access to clean water is something we take for granted, but for the local children, it is a precious gift that is difficult to obtain." (Note: Original:"对我们来说，使用干净的水是一件很平凡的事，但对当地孩子而言，却是珍贵且得来不易的礼物。") He also drew his inspiration from Bruce Lee's "Be Water" philosophy, which describes the adaptability of water to challenges without losing its identity.

"Be Like Water" is composed entirely by Firdhaus. He revealed that he never decided which singer would sing the song when he first composed it or whether it would be sung as a solo, duet, or given to others. After he completed the song's demo, he shared it with his label, receiving a passable response, which made him worried. He decided to "gift" the song to Cuckoo because he believed its concept aligned with the brand's spirit, and invited Siti to record the song with him. In May 2026, Firdhaus sang the demo with a guitar to Siti and her husband at their home, and Siti agreed to record the song with him. He recalled that he was very nervous when singing the song's demo to Siti, but was very glad that she liked it.

Siti admitted that the recording process was challenging due to her busy schedule, and that learning Mandarin was not easy for her. During the three-hour recording of Siti's vocals, Firdhaus, KC Hoe, and his wife were present to guide her in pronouncing the Mandarin words correctly. Firdhaus admitted that he was impressed by Siti's ability to pronounce Mandarin words despite never having formally learned the language.

== Music and lyrics ==
"Be Like Water" is a Mandopop song that lasts three minutes and eight seconds. The music and the lyrics were composed by Firdhaus. Inspired by Bruce Lee's "Be Water" philosophy, the lyrics describe how water serves as a metaphor to depict love and companionship while being both subtle and powerful. It also tells the story of how love as a quiet yet powerful force capable of bringing about profound change without the need for grand displays. Siti commented that she recorded the song with moderate vocals and did not need to sing with too many high notes, as it better fit the song's message.

"Be Like Water" fulfilled Firdhaus' dream to record a song with accompaniment from an orchestra. Recorded and arranged by Aubrey Suwito, the song features music performed by the Budapest Scoring Orchestra and vocals by the Dandelion Choir. Gayah of GayahIsTyping wrote that Aubrey managed to give the song a "grander cinematic dimension". (Note: Original:"dimensi sinematik yang lebih megah")

== Release and promotion ==
"Be Like Water" was released via streaming services on 30 June 2026. It was launched during the unveiling of Cuckoo Malaysia's "Cuckoo Loves, Cares" project at Kuala Lumpur Tower and served as Cuckoo Malaysia's official corporate social responsibility (CSR) theme song. During the event's press conference, Siti and Firdhaus performed the song live for the first time, and Firdhaus was appointed Cuckoo Malaysia's first CSR Friend and mentor for the Cuckoo Dream Fund.

Directed by Jasmine Wong, its music video, which was recorded at Petronas Philharmonic Hall, was also previewed during the press conference before being released later that same day.

== Reception ==
In an article by the New Straits Times, Tahir Alhamzah wrote that the song "encapsulates a broader narrative about modern Malaysian identity — fluid, multilingual, and unconfined by traditional borders." Aqilah Paharuzi of Xtra praised Siti's efforts, highlighting that even after 30 years in the music industry, she continues to broaden her career by transcending language and cultural barriers.

== Music video ==
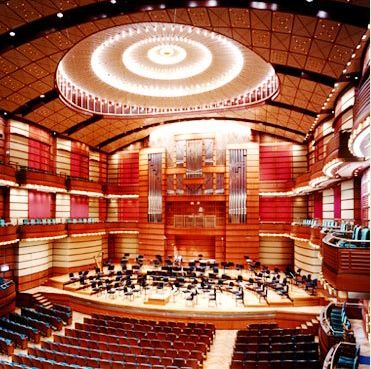
Petronas Philharmonic Hall, where its music video was recorded.

The music video for "Be Like Water" was published on YouTube on 30 June 2026. It was previewed for the first time during the song's press conference before its release later that same day. Directed by Jasmine Wong and shot at Petronas Philharmonic Hall, the music video features both Chinese and Malay subtitles.

In the music video, Siti and Firdhaus were accompanied by the Selangor and Kuala Lumpur Orchestra & Choir (SKOC) and the Yoke Nam Choir.

== Credits and personnel ==
Credits have been adapted from YouTube.

=== Recording and management ===
- Recorded at Cranky Music Studio (Siti Nurhaliza, Dandelion Choir), Little Bad Studio (Firdhaus Farmizi)
- Mixed by Peter Chong at Mixman Production
- Mastered by Jay Franco at Sterling Sound (New York)
- Produced by SN Legacy Sdn. Bhd.
- Published by Loolala Music (M) Sdn Bhd (original publisher), Universal Music Publishing Sdn Bhd (sub-publisher)

=== Personnel ===
- Siti Nurhaliza – vocals
- Firdhaus Farmizi – vocals, lyricist, songwriting
- Aubrey Suwito – record producer, arrangement, recording, piano
- Budapest Scoring Orchestra – orchestra
- Dandelion Choir - choir
- Jay Franco – mastering
- Keith Yong – recording
- Marcus Leong – guitar
- Peter Chong – mixing
- WeiC – recording

== Awards ==
Publication	Year	Award	Record holder	Result
Asia Records	2026	Asia’s First Chinese Corporate CSR Theme Song Featuring Datuk Seri Siti Nurhaliza and Firdhaus by a Home Living Brand	Cuckoo Malaysia	Record
