= Merican (disambiguation) =

Merican is a shortening of American. It may also refer to:

- 'Merican, an EP by American punk rock band Descendants
- Merican Mule, a canned Moscow Mule brand

== As a surname ==
- Reezal Merican Naina Merican (born 1972), Malaysian politician
- Faridah Merican (born 1939), Malaysian actor and director
- Sidique Ali Merican (1930–2009), Malaysian sprinter
