= Kuala Lumpur Performing Arts Centre =

Performing arts center in Kuala Lumpur, Malaysia

- A front view of KLPac
- Interactive map of Kuala Lumpur Performing Arts Centre
- Location: Sentul Park, Jalan Strachan, off Jalan Sultan Azlan Shah, Kuala Lumpur, Malaysia
- Coordinates: 3.1852°N 101.6864°E
- Owner: Kuala Lumpur Performing Arts Centre
- Seating type: theatre seat, hall seats, studios
- Capacity: 794 seats
- Type: Theatre, Concert hall
- Public transit: PY16 Sentul Barat MRT station

Construction
- Built: May 2004
- Opened: May 2005
- Architect: Baldip Singh

Website
- Official website

The Kuala Lumpur Performing Arts Centre (KLPac; Malay: Pentas Seni Kuala Lumpur) in Sentul Park, Kuala Lumpur is one of the established performing art centers in Malaysia. It is a non-profit company, aims to cultivate and sustain the performing arts for the Malaysian.

KLPac is the home for KLPac Orchestra, founded in 2006. The orchestra was formerly known as KLPac Sinfonietta.

== Background ==
In 1995, husband-and-wife Faridah Merican and actor Joe Hasham set up the first privately owned theater, known as "The Actor's Studio," at Plaza Putra (now known as Dataran Underground). However, flash floods on 10 June 2003 destroyed the underground complex. In May 2004, The Actor's Studio, YTL Corporation Berhad and Yayasan Budi Penyayang Malaysia collaborated to open a new performing arts center. The construction began in May 2004 and was completed a year later. The KLPac opened its doors to the public in May 2005.

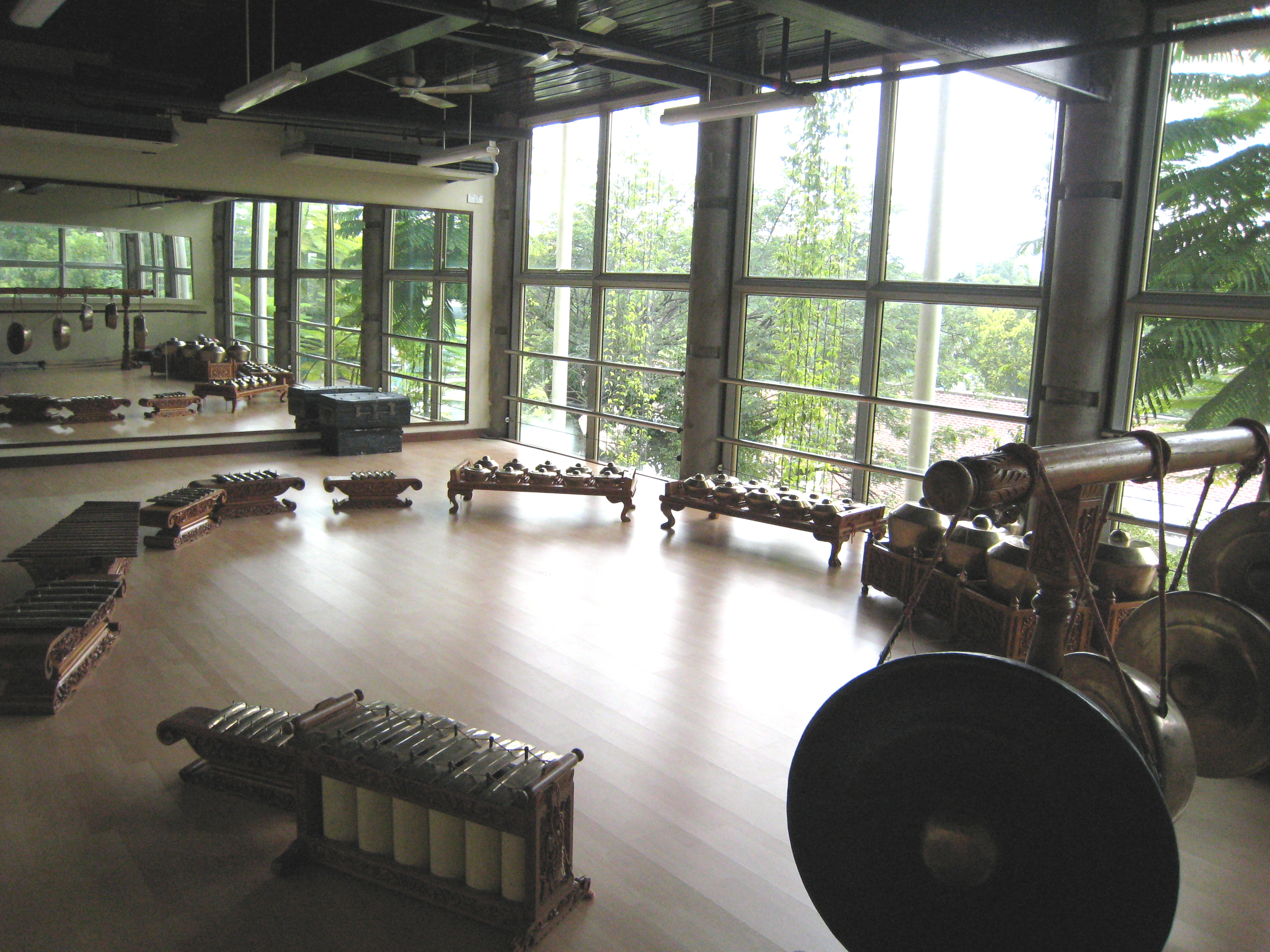
Studio 1, one of the rehearsal and training studios in KLPac

== Theatre halls and studios ==
A fully integrated performing arts centre with 7,614 square metres of built-up space comprising the following:

- Pentas 1 : 504 seats (a proscenium theatre)
- Pentas 2 : 192 modular seating (a black box theatre)
- Indicine : 100 seats
- Academy: 9 Studios for rehearsals and training

== Events and programmes ==
=== Theatre ===
Among local and international performers who have performed at KLPac are Patrick Teoh, Sharifah Amani, Ahmad Zamil, Joanna Bessey, David Knight, and Colin Kirton. KLPac has also hosted many noted performances such as Julius Caesar, Cinderella, Aladdin, Going North, Passion, The Odd Couple, Kudan Project Production, and Macbeth.

It has also hosted many events such as the HSBC Classics music festival, French Art Festival, Malaysian Dance festival, SHORT+SWEET festival and Urbanscapes.

=== Academy and education ===
The KLPac academy opens for students from all levels to students of underprivileged communities. The programs include of Theatre for Young People (T4YP), as well as many classes on music, dance and drama.

== See also ==
- KLPac Orchestra
- List of concert hall in Malaysia
