= Kudan Project Production =

Theatrical company in Nagoya, Japan

Kudan Project Production is a theatrical company for whom Tengai Amano writes and directs. They are only 2 actors, Hideji Oguma and Satoru Jitsunashi.

== History ==
The production, which is active mostly in Nagoya, Japan, was founded in 1998 by Tengai Amano (playwright and director) and Hideji Oguma (actor and producer). It consists of actors and crew from various renowned theatre groups and freelance artists. By combining high techniques of numerous groups and different genres, the project pursues a wider possibility of theatre arts.

Originally, the Kudan Project was organised for performing the play Kudan No Ken when the group went by the name of Kikori No Kai, back in 1995. After 1998, the company changed their name to the Kudan Project and started performing in Japanese cities. They also performed in prominent Asian cities such as Taipei, Hong Kong, Beijing, Busan and so on. The word kudan is the name of legendary Japanese monster that has the head of human and the body of a cow. The kudan sometimes shows up in human habitations and tells the people prophecies of a dire future.

After Kudan No Ken, the Kudan Project was looking for a new story to perform. Yaji and Kita is a two-man story, taking up the theme of reality vs dreams, life vs death. This was perfect match for the Kudan Project, their mission and their philosophy. Furthermore, Yaji and Kita happen to resemble to the actors, Hideji Oguma and Satoru Jitsunashi. It was seen as a fated meeting and they knew that they had to make Yayi and Kita for the stage.

Yaji and Kita also toured and performed in South East Asia, notably at KLPac (Kuala Lumpur Performing Arts Centre) and Francisco Santiago Hall in Makati, the Philippines.

KUDAN Project is supported by Agency for Cultural Affairs, Japan.
