= Tengai Amano =

Japanese film director (1960–2024)

Tengai Amano (Japanese: 天野天街; 20 May 1960 – 7 July 2024) was a Japanese playwright, director, and the leader of the drama group called "Shonen-oja-kan". He was born in Ichinomiya, Aichi prefecture, and graduated from the Department of History in Aichi Gakuin University. In 1982, he founded "Shonen-oja-kan" in Nagoya. The group started performing all over Japan, including Tokyo, Osaka, and Nagoya from 1984 on.

As one of the busiest directors in the country, Amano was active nationwide and directed in numerous other drama groups as a guest, as well as writing and directing for his own theatre group for almost 25 years. Besides drama, he had also produced dance, puppet shows, concerts, and fashion shows. He was involved in various kinds of stage arts for a long time. He directed and wrote the play "Yaji and Kita" for Kudan Project Production theatrical company.

Another part of his life works was illustration; designing of posters, CD covers, and book covers, and writing comics, and they are highly appreciated in all fields. The flyer for "Yaji and Kita" was also designed by Amano.

Amano's creativity also extended to filmmaking. In 1994, his directorial debut short film called "TWILIGHT" won the grand prize of the International Short Film Festival Oberhausen and the Melbourne International Film Festival (Short Film Programme) and with this movie he drew worldwide attention in the filmmaking field. In 2006, he planned to make 2 movies from stories by Japanese writers, "Neji-shiki" by Yohiharu Tsuge and "Nigyo-no-nageki" by Jun'ichiro Tanizaki.

Amano died from lung cancer on 7 July 2024, at the age of 64.
