= KLPac Orchestra =

KL Performing Arts Centre
- Orchestra
- Native name: KLPac Orchestra
- Founded: 2006
- Location: Kuala Lumpur, Malaysia
- Concert hall: KL Performing Arts Centre
- Website: KLPac official website

The Kuala Lumpur Performing Arts Centre Orchestra (KLPac Orchestra), founded in 2006, is the resident orchestra of the Kuala Lumpur Performing Arts Centre in Kuala Lumpur, Malaysia. It is formerly known as KLPac Sinfonietta until 2008.

KLPac orchestra was formed to cater for the growing number of classically trained music students and amateurs in Malaysia. The first auditions were held in October 2006, opened to a wide range of musicians, from students, music teachers as well as professionals. The orchestra made its debut concert, "Candlelight Christmas" in December 2006 conducted by its first conductor, Brian Tan, accompanied by the guest choir, La Voce.

== Music directors / conductors ==
- Brian Tan Wee Thean (2006–2011) Music director / Resident conductor
- Dr. Takahisa Ota (2011–2014) Music director / Resident conductor
- Lee Kok Leong (2015–) Music director / Resident conductor
