= Joe Hasham =

Lebanese Australian actor

Joe Hasham OAM
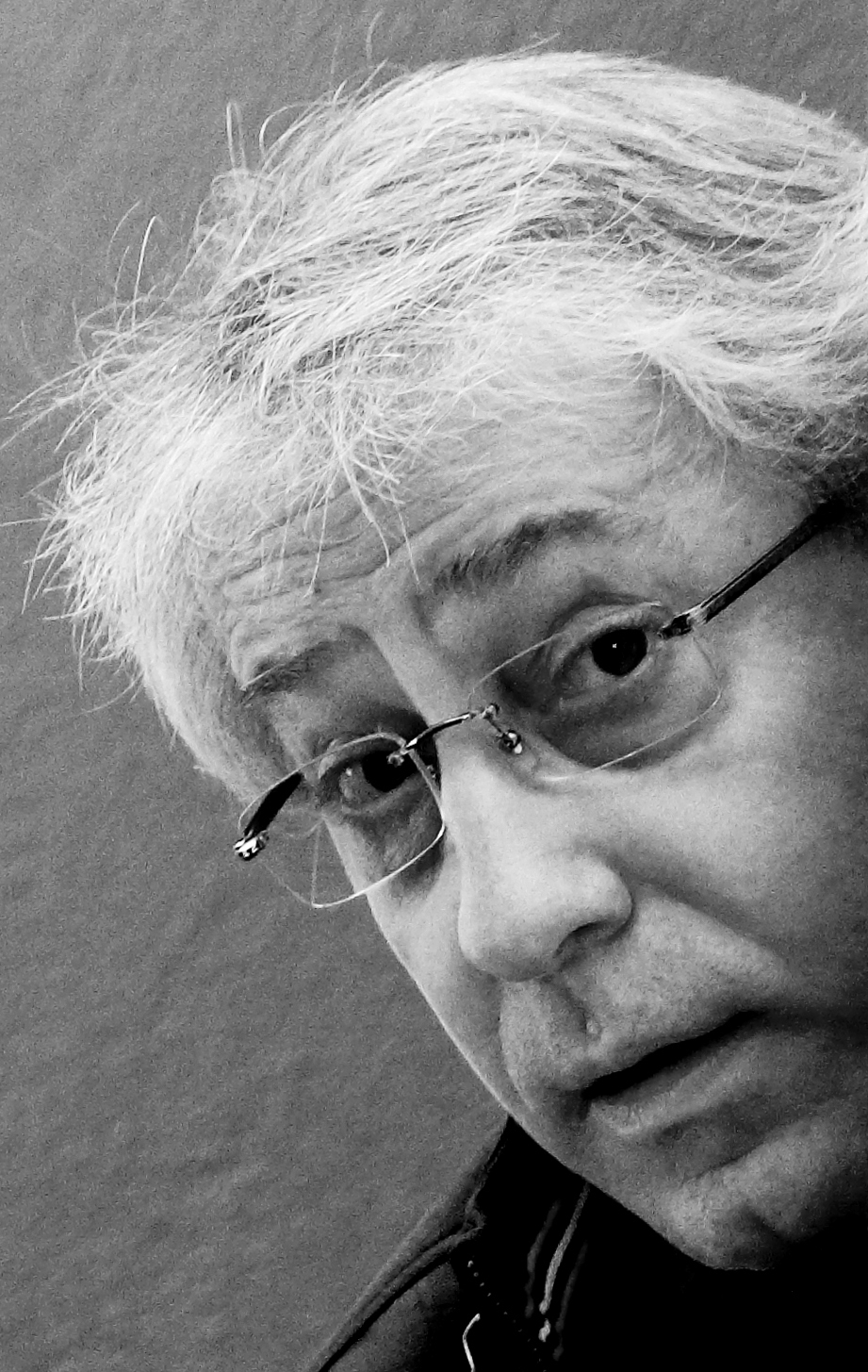
- Hasham in 2012
- Born: Joseph Christopher Hasham; 4 September 1948 (age 77); Tripoli, northern Lebanon
- Education: National Institute of Dramatic Art
- Occupations: Artistic director, former actor
- Years active: 1969–present
- Known for: Number 96 (soap opera) as Don Finlayson; Kuala Lumpur Performing Arts Centre; Living arts Malaysia; JHA Productions; The Actors Studio
- Spouse: Faridah Merican

Joseph Christopher Hasham (Arabic: جو هشام) (born 4 September 1948, Tripoli, Lebanon) is a Lebanese-born Malaysian based artistic director, actor, director and writer, he is a former radio and TV actor who was previously based in Australia and in the 1970s became notable through his role of dependable and decent gay lawyer Don Finlayson in television soap opera Number 96.

He subsequently emigrated to Malaysia in 1984, where he has worked on stage, video post-production and as a theatre entrepreneur, writer and director and commercial producer alongside his wife Faridah Merican.

== Career ==
Hasham was born on 4 September 1948, in Tripoli, north Lebanon, after arriving in Australia he graduated from the National Institute of Dramatic Art in 1968

Hasham made several appearances in television series produced by Crawford Productions.

When Number 96 began in 1972, it was an instant hit. Original cast member Hasham became one of the most popular cast members, regarded as a sex symbol by many fans. He reprised the role in the feature film version of the serial, in which his character engaged in a gay kiss with the closeted Simon Carr (John Orcsik), although the shot was later cut from the film. Hasham continued to play the role until Number 96 ended in 1977.

Later in the show's run, a spin-off series focusing on Hasham's character switching to a career as a private investigator also failed to pan-out.

After the series ended, Hasham continued his acting career with roles where he was part of a television series ensemble. His most widely seen post-Number 96 acting performance in Australia was likely an ongoing role as villain, Ken Hansen, in soap opera The Young Doctors in 1979.

Through the early 1980s he presented a series of television advertisements for a television rental company called 'Electronic Sales and Rentals'.

During the run of the Number 96 Hasham released a pop-music album, although he was not able to successfully launch a career as a singer.

== Emigration and career in Malaysia ==
Hasham emigrated to Malaysia in 1984.

Initially, he joined with kindred spirits to form a commercial production company, which grew rapidly… finishing their material in Australia became a burden, and it soon became obvious there was a market for a local ‘post’ production facility.

Launched as GHA Images Sdn Bhd (Goudie, Hasham & Aman) in partnership with Antah Holdings, late in 1987. Subsequently it was rebranded, and still operates today as APV (Asia-Pacific Videolab). Over the following decades of growth, APV has developed a reputation as one of the leading video post facilities in the region.

From that ‘foot in the door’ - into the Malaysian television and creative world, together with his actor wife Faridah Merican, he looked back to his roots and set up The Actors Studio actor training and theatre company in 1989. He is currently the Artistic Director of the company.

He and Merican are also responsible for the Kuala Lumpur Performing Arts Centre (KLPac) along with Living Arts Malaysia which aims to introduce theatre to young Malaysians. Hasham's production company JHA Productions is responsible for many of the commercials screened on Malaysian television.

== Order of Australia ==
In 2009, Hasham was awarded a Medal of the Order of Australia (OAM) "for service to performing arts through The Actors Studio, Malaysia, and as an actor, writer, producer and director".

== Filmography ==
=== Film ===
Year	Title	Role	Type
1971	3 to Go	John	Anthology film, segment: Toula
1974	Number 96	Don Finlayson	Film adaptation

=== Television ===
Year	Title	Role	Type
1971	The Thursday Creek Mob	Private Squizzy Taylor	TV series
1971	Homicide	Scott Martin	TV series, 1 episode
1971	Matlock Police	Johnny Marcellis / Nick Katsavakis	TV series, 2 episodes
1971–1972	Division 4	Will Robinson / Barry Ward / Mud / Dave Brown / Lew Fletcher	TV series, 5 episodes
1972–1977	Number 96	Don Finlayson	TV series, 331 episodes
1974	This Afternoon	Seif	TV series
1975	Hasham	Self	TV special
1975	Australian Pops Orchestra	Host	TV special
1975	King of Pop	Host	TV special
1977	The Guinness Olympics	Host	TV special
1977–1978	Blankety Blanks	Panellist	TV series
1978	Good Morning Sydney	Host	TV series
1978	Micro Macro	Self	TV series
1978	Racing New Faces	Self	TV special
1978–1979	The Young Doctors	Ken Hansen	TV series, 8 episodes
1979	The Oracle		TV miniseries, 1 episode
1980	Celebrity Tattle Tales	Self	TV series
1980	John Laws' World	Self	TV series
1980	Cabaret	Host	TV series
1980–1983	The Mike Walsh Show	Self	TV series, 3 episodes
1981	Cop Shop	Sharkey	TV series, 1 episode
1982	Spring & Fall	Boss	TV series, 1 episode
2012	The Ancient Seamasters: The Journey of the Malayo-Polynesian Ancient Seafarers	Narrator	Documentary video

== Discography ==
=== Studio albums ===
List of albums, with Australian chart positions
Title	Album details	Peak chart positions
Title	Album details	AUS
New World	Released: May 1975; Format: LP; Label: Festival Records (L-35532)	27

=== Singles ===
List of singles, with Australian chart positions
Year	Title	Peak chart positions	Album
Year	Title	AUS	Album
1975	"New World in the Morning"	78	New World
