= Gulf of Alaska (song) =

Single by Firdhaus Farmizi

from the album A Letter
- Language: Chinese
- Released: November 20, 2020
- Genre: Mandopop
- Length: 4:06
- Songwriters: Lee Kang Ning; Firdhaus Farmizi
- Producer: Firdhaus Farmizi

Firdhaus Farmizi singles chronology
"My Type" (2020)	"Gulf of Alaska" (2020)	"If I Die Pls Tell My Mom I Love Her" (2020)

Music video
- "Gulf of Alaska" on YouTube

"Gulf of Alaska" (Chinese: 阿拉斯加海湾) is a song by Malaysian singer Firdhaus Farmizi.

== Background ==
This song was inspired by an online photo of the Gulf of Alaska, which showed two distinct shades of blue water that could not merge. He saved the title "Gulf of Alaska" on his phone, determined to write a song for a girl he wanted to win back after a heartbreak. One night, while playing his guitar in his room, the lyric "Oh heaven, can't you see I love her?" (上天啊，难道你看不出我很爱她) came to him, and that was when the song started to take form.

== Personnel ==
All credits adapted from Apple Music.

Musicians

- Firdhaus Farmizi – performer

Technical

- Firdhaus Farmizi – composer, lyrics, producer
- Lee Kang Ning – lyrics

== Charts ==
Weekly chart performance for "Gulf of Alaska"
Chart (2024)	Peak position
Malaysia (Top 10 Chinese Singles)	9
