= Golden Princess (ship) =

Golden Princess may refer to one of the following ships:

- Golden Princess (1993), in service with Princess Cruises between 1993 and 1997
- MS Golden Princess (2000), operated under this name between 2000 and 2009
- Golden Princess (2000), in service with Princess Cruises between 2001 and 2020
