= Mohd Taufik Nordin =

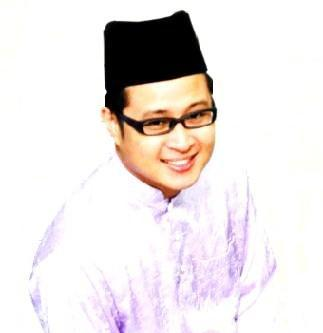
Mohd Taufik, Nordin Malaysian composer and independent nasyid singer. 46 years old (1979)

Mohd Taufik bin Nordin (born 1979), also recognized commercially as Mohd Taufic Nordin is a Melaka Malaysian composer and independent nasyid singer. He is regarded as one of the most talented newcomers to the Malaysian Nasyid indie music industry.

== Education ==
He earned a bachelor's degree in Material Science from the National University of Malaysia (UKM). He began his career as an engineer in CTRM Aero Composites Sdn Bhd and currently works as chief executive officer of Composites Testing Laboratory Asia Sdn Bhd. (www.ctla.asia)

== Career ==
He composed his first song at the age of thirteen and followed with the second pop song in the following year. His first nasyid song was composed at the age of seventeen and he became involved in a nasyid group of Melaka High School between the years 1995–1996. The highest achievement was as runner up in a district level nasyid school competition in Melaka.

The same year, he composed another five pop songs to be included in his demo album with other three best friends and formed a group called R3F. The demo was sent to EMI. EMI responded but was not interested to offer any record deal. In the same year, R3F produced another demo album with more songs originally written by mohd Taufik bin Nordin, but the group decided to keep the album instead of sending it to any record label as most of the members continue their study in higher level including Mohd Taufik bin Nordin.

In his one-year session of matriculation (pre-university), Mohd Taufik has composed his first theme song for the matriculation annual dinner titled "NUMMAC 97". He continued his study in 1988 at National University of Malaysia (UKM), Bangi Selangor whereby he became the founder of Firasat Inzar Nasyid Club of UKM (the official university nasyid club) and the club is still establish until today. He also composed the theme song for "Anak Melaka UKM Club" with title "Segalanya Bermula Di Sini".

During his study in UKM, he was actively involved in nasyid competition, song competition, nasyid concert, koir performance, lyric and songwriting. On his 1st generation of Firasat Inzar, he was invited as a guest performer in a huge concert of popular Malaysian nasyid group; Hijjaz and Saujana in UKM. They debuted two new singles of Firasat Inzar during the concert and received an overwhelming amount of replies from fans.

Soon after the graduation, he became the testing engineer in CTRM Aero Composites Sdn Bhd in Melaka and continue with his interest in music as song composer, vocal coach and lyricist. As for today he is the Head of Division of Operation and Technical in CTL Asia Sdn Bhd and managing director of his company named mtnrmusic.

Singers: Halwa Nurani, Firasat Inzar, Nawarastu, Zabarjad, Daluwarsa, Irhamnie, Nurqhasra, DGWA, Bilal Al Rayess, Imtiaz, Qurratuaini, Cahaya Gemilang, Azzahran, Humaira, Hamrah, Nurani, Zulfan, Caliph@Navy, Ali Imran, A'ish, Insyirah, Invoices and Ajude.

== Commercial ==
His first commercial debut nasyid song title "Rindu Kedamaian" a nasyid song recorded by Devotees in the album titled "Berjalan Tanpa Henti" and released in 2011 . His international debut was recorded by a Middle Eastern reality TV star (winner of Studio El Fan 1996–1997); Bilal Al Rayess from Lebanon and the single with title "Aali Sawoutik" lyric by Tony Abi Karam. This single is released exclusively by MTV Lebanon on 18 March 2012.

== Achievements ==
1996

- 2nd District School Nasyid Competition

"Hindarilah Dadah" – Song/Lyric by Mohd Taufik Bin Nordin
1998

- Champion of UKM Nasyid Competition

"Hindarilah Dadah" – Firasat Inzar Song/Lyric by Mohd Taufik Bin Nordin

- 1st Runner MAKUM Nasyid Competition

"Langkah Kemenangan" – Firasat Inzar Song/Lyric by Mohd Taufik Bin Nordin
1999

- 1st Runner MAKUM Nasyid Competition

"Siratan Tabir Ilmi" – Firasat Inzar Song by Mohd Taufik Bin Nordin/Lyric by Mohd Affendy Izani
Best Lyric Award
" Muara Kelayuan" – Firasat Inzar Song/Lyric by Mohd Taufik Bin Nordin
1999

- 1st Runner MAKUM Nasyid Competition

"Siratan Tabir Ilmi" – Firasat Inzar Song by Mohd Taufik Bin Nordin/Lyric by Mohd Affendy Izani
Best Lyric Award
" Muara Kelayuan" – Firasat Inzar Song/Lyric by Mohd Taufik Bin Nordin
2000

- Champion UKM Pop Song Competition

"Melankolia" – Mohd Taufik Bin Nordin Song by Mohd Taufik Bin Nordin/Lyric Mohd Afendy Izani
Best Song Award
2001

- State Champion Selangor Nasyid Festival – Nasyid Modern Category

"Kudus Kesiangan"* – Firasat Inzar Song by Mohd Taufik Bin Nordin/Lyric by Mohd Azli bin Othman
*this song represent Selangor in the National Nasyid Competition of 2001
2006

- State Champion Melaka Nasyid Festival – Nasyid Traditional Category

"Siratan Tabir Ilmu"* – Halwa Nurani Song by Mohd Taufik Bin Nordin/Lyric by Mohd Afendy Izani
*this song represent Melaka in the National Nasyid Competition of 2006

- State Champion Negeri Sembilan Nasyid Festival – Nasyid Modern Category

"Gapai Impi"* – Nawarastu Song by Mohd Taufik Bin Nordin/Lyric by Che Rosnah Daud
*this song represent Negeri Sembilan in the National Nasyid Competition of 2006

- Champion Open Category Nasyid Festival – Nasyid Modern Category

"Dan Hatinya"* – Nur Qhasrah Song by Mohd Taufik Bin Nordin/Lyric by Mohd Azli Othman
*this song represent Open Category in the National Nasyid Competition of 2006

- 1st Runner-up National Nasyid Festival- Nasyid Modern Category

"Gapai Impi"* – Nawarastu Song by Mohd Taufik Bin Nordin/Lyric by Che Rosnah Daud
Best Modern Song
Best Modern Lyric
2007

- State Champion Melaka Nasyid Festival – Nasyid Traditional Category

"Kemilau Insan"* – Daluwarsa Song by Mohd Taufik Bin Nordin/Lyric by Raja Mohd Azlan
*this song represent Melaka in the National Nasyid Competition of 2007

- State Champion Negeri Sembilan Nasyid Festival – Nasyid Modern Category

"Dian Gemilang"* – Nawarastu Song by Mohd Taufik Bin Nordin/Lyric by Che Rosnah Daud
*this song represent Negeri Sembilan in the National Nasyid Competition of 2007
2008

- State Champion Negeri Sembilan Nasyid Festival – Nasyid Traditional Category

"Lintasan Nurani"* – Zabarjad Song/Lyric by Mohd Taufik Bin Nordin
*this song represent Negeri Sembilan in the National Nasyid Competition of 2008
2009

- State Champion Melaka Nasyid Festival – Nasyid Traditional Category

"Langkah Sekata"* – Irhamnie** Song by Jasnie/Lyric by Kamaruddin
Best Performance
Overall Winner
*this song represent Melaka in the National Nasyid Competition of 2009
**Mohd Taufik is one of the vocalist in this group

- State Champion Negeri Sembilan Nasyid Festival – Nasyid Traditional Category

"Tulus Mahabbah"* – Nawarastu Song by Mohd Taufik Bin Nordin/Lyric by Mohammad Mohd Tawil
*this song represent Negeri Sembilan in the National Nasyid Competition of 2009

- State Champion Negeri Sembilan Nasyid Festival – Nasyid Modern Category

"Kebangkitan"* – Imtiaz Song by Mohd Taufik Bin Nordin/Lyric by Mohammad Mohd Tawil
*this song represent Negeri Sembilan in the National Nasyid Competition of 2009

- State Champion Selangor Nasyid Festival – Nasyid Modern Category

"Harum Islami"* – Firasat Inzar Song by Mohd Taufik Bin Nordin/Lyric by Muhammad Mohd Tawil
*this song represent Selangor in the National Nasyid Competition of 2009

- Champion Government Nasyid Festival – Nasyid Modern Category

"Satu Iltizam"* – DG-WA Song by Mohd Taufik Bin Nordin/Lyric by Mohammad Mohd Tawil
*this song represent Government in the National Nasyid Competition of 2009

- National Nasyid Competition – Nasyid Traditional Category

"Langkah Sekata"* – Irhamnie** Song by Jasnie/Lyric by Kamaruddin
Top 5 – Finalist Traditional Nasyid Category
2010

- State Champion Wilayah Persekutuan Nasyid Festival – Nasyid Traditional Category

"Indah Pekerti"* – Insyirah Song by Mohd Taufik Bin Nordin/Lyric by Mohd Azli Othman
*this song represent Wilayah Persekutuan in the National Nasyid Competition of 2010

- State Champion Wilayah Persekutuan Nasyid Festival – Nasyid Modern Category

"Kurnia Dari Hakiki"* – Cahaya Gemilang Song/Lyric by Mohd Taufik Bin Nordin/Lyric by Andy
Mirza/Mohd Taufik Bin Nordin
*this song represent Wilayah Persekutuan in the National Nasyid Competition of 2010

- State Champion Melaka Nasyid Festival – Nasyid Traditional Category

"Berjalan Sehaluan"* – Irhamnie Song by Mohd Taufik Bin Nordin/Lyric by Mohammad Mohd Tawil
Best Performance
Overall Winner
*this song represent Melaka in the National Nasyid Competition of 2010
Finalist in National Nasyid Competition of 2010 (top 5)

- State Champion Melaka Nasyid Festival – Nasyid Modern Category

"Pengharapan"* – Irhamnie Song by Mohd Taufik Bin Nordin/Lyric by Mohammad Mohd Tawil
*this song represent Melaka in the National Nasyid Competition of 2010

- State Champion Negeri Sembilan Nasyid Festival – Nasyid Modern Category

"Genta Wahdah"* – Nawarastu Song by Mohd Taufik Bin Nordin/Lyric by Mohammad Mohd Tawil
*this song represent Negeri Sembilan in the National Nasyid Competition of 2010
2011

- State Champion Melaka Nasyid Festival – Nasyid Traditional

"Kelana"* – Irhamnie Song by Mohd Taufik Bin Nordin/Lyric by Mohammad Mohd Tawil
Best Performance
Overall Winner
*this song represent Melaka in the National Nasyid Competition of 2011

- Champion MAKUM Nasyid Festival – Nasyid Modern Category

"Kiblat Ku"* – Firasat Inzar Song/Lyric by Mohd Taufik Bin Nordin
*this song represent MAKUM in the National Nasyid Competition of 2011

- State Champion Wilayah Persekutuan Nasyid Festival – Nasyid Traditional Category

"Kalamullah"* – A'ish Song by Mohd Taufik Bin Nordin/Lyric by Ustaz As'ari Abdan
*this song represent Wilayah Persekutuan in the National Nasyid Competition of 2011

- State Champion Wilayah Persekutuan Nasyid Festival – Nasyid Modern Category

"Khalifah"* – Zulfan Song by Rohaizad/Lyric by Mohd Taufik Bin Nordin
*this song represent Johor in the National Nasyid Competition of 2011

- State Champion Negeri Sembilan Nasyid Festival – Nasyid Traditional Category

"Hijrah"* – Ali Imran Song by Mohd Taufik Nordin/Lyric by Syanil Tsaure
*this song represent Negeri Sembilan in the National Nasyid Competition of 2011
2012

- Youth National Nasyid Festival 2012

"Khalifah" – Caliph@Navy Song by Rohaizad/Lyric by Mohd Taufik Nordin
Champion

- Selangor Nasyid Festival – Nasyid Traditional Category

"Hijrah"* – Ali Imran Song by Mohd Taufik Nordin/Lyric by Syanil Tsaure
1st Runner-up

- Pertandingan Nasyid & Marhaban Anjuran JKKN

"Berjalan Sehaluan"* – Nurqhasra Song by Mohd Taufik Bin Nordin/Lyric by Mohammad Mohd Tawil
1st Runner-up

- National Level Pertandingan Nasyid Belia 4B National Level

"Al Quran Kalamullah"* – Nawarastu Song by Mohd Taufik Bin Nordin/Lyric by Ustaz As'ari Abdan
"Nur Keinsafan"* – Nawarastu Song by Mohd Taufik Bin Nordin/Lyric by Che Rosnah Daud
1st Runner-up

- Pertandingan Cipta Nasyid Anjuran JKKN & Radio IKIM FM

"Satu Iltizam"* – DGWA Feat Azwan Fareast Song by Che Rosnah Daud & Mohd Taufik Bin Nordin/Lyric by Mohammad Mohd Tawil
Finalist Top 15

- Johor Nasyid Festival – Nasyid Modern Category

"Semalam"* – Hamrah Song by Mohd Taufik Nordin/Lyric by Che Rosnah Daud
1st Runner-up

- State Champion Melaka Nasyid Festival – Nasyid Traditional Category

"Ukhuwah"* – Irhamnie Song by Mohd Taufik Nordin/Lyric by Mohd Taufik Nordin
Champion

- State Champion Kuala Lumpur Nasyid Festival – Nasyid Modern Category

"Meraih Cinta Hakiki"* – Humaira Song by Mohd Taufik Nordin/Lyric by Che Rosnah
Champion

- Kuala Lumpur Nasyid Festival – Nasyid Modern Category

"KasihNya"* – Invoices Song by Mohd Taufik Nordin/Lyric by Muhammad Mohd Tawil
3rd Runner-up

- Kuala Lumpur Nasyid Festival – Nasyid Traditional Category

"Hikmah Pelayaran"* – Nurani Song by Mohd Taufik Nordin/Lyric by Muhammad Mohd Tawil
3rd Runner-up
2013

- Negeri Sembilan Nasyid Festival 2013 - Nasyid Traditional Category

"Dan HatiNya" – Nawarastu Song by MOhd Taufik Nordin/Lyric by Mohd Taufik Nordin
Champion
Best Traditional Lyric
2014

- Youth Nasyid Festival 2014 State Level - Melaka

"Cinta Ilahi" – Irhamnie Song by Mohd Taufik Nordin/Lyric by Mohd Taufik Nordin
Champion

- Youth Nasyid Festival 2014 State Level - Negeri Sembilan

"Gapai Impi" – Nawarastu Song by Mohd Taufik Nordin/Lyric by Che Rosnah Daud
Champion

- Youth Nasyid Festival 2014 State Level - Selangor

"Siratan Tabir Ilmi" – Song by Mohd Taufik Nordin/Lyric by Mohd taufik Nordin
Champion

- Youth National Nasyid Festival – 4th

"Cinta Ilahi"* – Irhamnie Song by Mohd Taufik Nordin/Lyric by Syanil Tsaure
