= Queenzy Cheng =

Malaysian actress and singer (1986–2023)

- Born: Cheng Koon Si; 26 February 1986; Kangar, Perlis, Malaysia
- Died: 28 November 2023 (aged 37); Petaling Jaya, Selangor, Malaysia
- Resting place: Prestavest Memorial Park Pokok Sena, Alor Setar, Kedah, Malaysia
- Occupations: Singer, actress
- Years active: 1994–2023
- Musical career
- Also known as: Cheng Koon Si (莊群施)
- Genres: Pop; Mandopop; Classical; Musical theatre
- Formerly of: M-Girls
- Website: https://www.queenzycheng.com

Queenzy Cheng Koon Si (Chinese: 庄群施; pinyin: Zhuāng Qúnshī; Pe̍h-ōe-jī: Chng Kûn-si; 26 February 1986 – 28 November 2023) was a Malaysian actress and singer, the member of music group M-Girls.

Queenzy Cheng
- Traditional Chinese: 莊群施
- Simplified Chinese: 庄群施
Transcriptions
Standard Mandarin
- Hanyu Pinyin: Zhuāng qún shī
Yue: Cantonese
- Jyutping: Zong1 Kwan4 Si1
Southern Min
- Hokkien POJ: Chng Kûn-si
- Tâi-lô: Tsng Kûn-si

== Biography ==
Queenzy Cheng was born on 26 February 1986. Her musical career began when she was five, performing solo in a relative's wedding reception. She gradually transformed into an artiste, launching her debut at the age of eight. Famous for releasing Chinese New Year albums over the last two decades, Queenzy also performed across other genres, from classical music to musical theatre and pop.

Following the success of her albums, Queenzy collectively formed M-Girls (四个女生) in 2001 with three other emerging artistes: Angeline Khoo, Cass Chin and Crystal Ong. The M-Girls' debut album and subsequent releases won multiple awards, and M-Girls was quickly dubbed the S.H.E of Malaysia. Their albums were not only the fastest-selling albums in the history of Malaysian Chinese New Year albums, but also in the Asian region. To date, M-Girls have released more than 17 albums.

In 2017, Queenzy collaborated with Taiwanese model Tom Chang (張瀚元) to release the single titled "Don't Be Shy" (愛). The single was recorded in Kuala Lumpur, Malaysia, and filmed in Taipei, Taiwan. On 9 October 2017, Queenzy announced on her Facebook page that she would be releasing her 2018 Chinese New Year album solo, since M-Girls were taking a break. She also invited her fans to participate by submitting their lyrics to be part of that year's album. Queenzy revealed that she was releasing the 2018 You Are The Best! album with guest celebrities including Wei Wei (⼩薇薇), John Wee (黄俊源) and Tedd Chan (曾国辉) on 15 November 2017.

In 2018, Queenzy collaborated with Crystal Ong to reproduce an online single similar to their 1995 album 双星报喜 (Double Stars Bring Luck). They reproduced the song "招财进宝" ("Lucky Fortune") with almost identical costumes, composition and filming methods. On 15 October 2018, Queenzy announced that she would release her album Queenzy and Friends in 2019 with guest celebrities including Chan, Veron Lin (练倩汶) as well as PongPong (碰碰), Jeii Pong (庞捷忆), and Gaston Pong (庞圭武).

On 28 November 2023, Queenzy was found dead from a ruptured brain aneurysm at age 37 while filming a video for a short-form social media channel called "Squad Sekawan". She was cremated at Prestavest Memorial Park, Pokok Sena near Alor Setar.

== Discography ==
=== Early albums (Folk / Chinese New Year) ===
- 1995 – 卖馄饨 Selling Wontons (Queenzy's Solo Album)
- 1995 – 神奇电脑 Magic Computer (Queenzy's Solo Album)
- 1995 – 金童玉女 First Timers (Queenzy & Su Li Da)
- 1995 – 双星报喜 Vol.1 Double Stars Bring Luck (Queenzy & Crystal's CNY Album)
- 1995 – 雅歌群星龙狮会 Ya-Ko Stars Lion Dance (Queenzy, Crystal & Ya-Ko Stars' CNY Album)
- 1996 – 双星报喜 Vol.2 Double Stars Bring Luck (Queenzy & Crystal's CNY Album)
- 1996 – 雅歌群星贺新年 Ya-Ko Stars Celebrate the New Year (Queenzy, Crystal & Ya-Ko Stars' CNY Album)
- 1996 – 花花絮絮 Highlights (Crystal & Queenzy)
- 1998 – 新春嘉年华 Chinese New Year Carnival (Queenzy & Chen Jia Lin's CNY Album)
- 1998 – 三星报喜 Three Stars Bring Luck (Queenzy, Winnie & Chingy's 1998 CNY Album)
- 1999 – 兔气扬眉庆丰年 Tu Qi Yang Mei Qing Feng Nian (Queenzy, Cassandra, Crystal & Ya-Ko Stars' CNY Album)
- 1999 – 山歌黄梅调 Huang Mei Diao Mountain Songs (Queenzy, Cassandra & Crystal's Album)
- 2000 – 三星拱照庆龙年 Three Stars Celebrate the Year of the Dragon (Queenzy, Cassandra & Crystal's CNY Album)
- 2000 – 民谣 Folk Songs 2 in 1 (Queenzy, Cassandra & Crystal's Album)

=== Pop albums ===
- 2001 – Dance With Me (2001)
- 2003 – 耍花样 Playful Tricks
- 2004 – 笨金鱼 Silly Goldfish
- 2004 – 爱情密码 Love Code (MV collection)
- 2005 – 尼罗河 Nile River
- 2013 / 2014 – My Way
- 2017 – 愛 Don't Be Shy

=== Chinese New Year albums ===
- 2001 – 開心迎接豐收年 Happily Welcoming the Harvest Year
- 2002 – 飛跃新年 Leaping New Year
- 2003 – 新年 YEAH! New Year YEAH!
- 2004 – 春风催花开 Flowers Blossom in the Spring
- 2005 – 开心年 Happy Year
- 2006 – 同庆共乐 Celebrate Together
- 2007 – 世外桃源 Paradise
- 2007 – 八大巨星 好日子 Eight Superstars Good Day
- 2008 – 福禄寿星拱照·花仙子 Fu Lu Shou Xing Gong Zhao. Flower Fairy
- 2009 – 桃花开了 Flowers Blossoms
- 2010 – 金玉满堂 Abundant Wealth
- 2012 – 年味 The Fragrance of Chinese New Year
- 2013 – 团聚 Reunion
- 2014 – 真欢喜 True Joy
- 2015 – 新春佳期 New Spring Holiday
- 2016 – 年来了 Chinese New Year is Coming
- 2017 – 过年要红红 Reddish Chinese New Year
- 2018 – 今年你最好 You Are The Best!
- 2019 – 双星报喜 招财进宝 Double Stars Bring Luck - Lucky Fortune (Queenzy & Crystal's CNY Single)
- 2019 – 春天的愿望 Spring Wishes
- 2020 – 春风笑了 Joyous Spring Breeze
- 2021 – 牛起来 Happy Niu Year
- 2022 – 好好好 Good, Better, Best!
- 2023 – 兔年回家快乐 Happy Homecoming
- 2024 – 好运气 Good Luck

== Filmography ==
- 童话的天空 Fairy Tales of the Sky
- 小岛物语 Island Story
- 别说爱情苦 Do not say love is bitter
- 恭喜发财婆婆 Kung Hei Fatt Choy Grandma
- 相亲相爱庆虎年 Celebrate Chinese New Year With Love
- 金虎报喜 Golden Tiger Annunciation
- 心中有鬼 Matrimony
- 囚 Imprisonment (2013)
- 心迷 Mind Game (2014)
- 重案狙击 On The Brink (2014)
- 法内情 The Precedents (2015)
- 重案狙击 2 On The Brink 2 (2015)
- 脉动人心 The Pulse of Life (2015)
- 最烂学生? 3 Bad Students? 3 (2015)
- 我愿时光倒流 This Moment of Yesterday (2015)
- 爱丽丝历险记 Alice in the Wonderland (2016)
- 欢喜欢喜就好 Astro Hua Hee Everyday Season 7, 8 & 9 (2016)
- 师出名门 I Court You (2020)
- 明星真人秀 Star Family Show (2024) (Posthumous work)
