= Prema (musician) =

Malaysian singer

- Origin: Malaysia
- Genres: Soul, R&B, funk
- Occupation(s): Singer-songwriter, composer, musician, record producer
- Instrument(s): Vocals, Acoustic guitar
- Labels: MoreReverb

Prema Lucas (better known simply as Prema) was born in Taiping, Malaysia. Educated in Australia, where she obtained a Bachelor of Arts from the University of Adelaide, Prema started her singing career busking and singing in pubs. Rozlan Aziz of R.A.P showed a keen interest in Prema's career upon her return to Malaysia and she was invited to perform as a guest artiste at the Ikhlas concert in Malaysia at Merdeka to 45,000 people.

Prema was then signed to Warner Music (Malaysia) where she started work on her self-titled debut album, Prema. Her first single, "Alive Again" was released in 1997 which resulted in her first music video for the song. Her second music video was released in 1998 for the track "Oblivion". This album was nominated for four AIM awards in Malaysia.

In 1999, Prema left Malaysia and Warner Music to relocate to England, where she spent time writing for Warner Chappell (Malaysia).

In 2008, Prema began work on her second album under her own record label, MoreReverb.com. The album entitled In Fusion, released in early 2009, was written and produced by Prema, except for the guitar parts which the Motown guitarist Wah Wah Watson produced and arranged himself. This album aksi features Peter Erskine (Weather Report), Luis Perdomo, Damian Erskine and Bashiri Johnson.
