= Ronnie Pereira =

Malaysian musician

Ronnie Pereira was a Malaysian musician who was best known as the lead guitarist and singer of the 1970s band Revolvers. He was popularly known as the Malaysian Carlos Santana for the way he emulated Santana in playing the guitar.

== Evolvement of Revolvers The Band In Klang. ==
The Original Revolvers (OR) was formed in early 1966, consisting of Frankie Yap (rhythm guitarist and vocalist from the Blue Beats), Robert Henry Diaz (also known as the only Mick Jagger of Klang), Augustine Lee, (lead guitarist) Robert Chua, (bass guitarist from the Blue Beats) Michael Magness (keyboard) and Raghavan Menon (drummer). During that time, the group performed in colleges, dances and private functions such as the Sultans of Selangor's birthday parties in Klang Istana. The young and talented musical aspirants of Klang were unaware of not only putting Klang in prominence but also the state of Selangor.

The Revolvers built a reputation in Selangor as an unconventional band playing more than just top 10 covers of popular western dance hits, the rage in the late 1960s and early 1970s.

The group showcased at Stadium Negara Miss Malaysia Beauty Contest, with the signature tune Live and Let Die. The band was well received as evident by the applause.

The OR, namely Frankie Yap, Robert Chua, and Augustine Lee headed overseas from December 1968. Such were their love and passion for music the group recruited Phil Thompson, within a year of their arrival in UK, as a drummer for the band. Performances in restaurant, South London College and Private party in Kilburn, London, to name a few.

Fanfare Musical Magazine of Malaysia wanting to get a bit of the action, requested for an interview, which took place in Shepard’s Bush London. The interviews and a photo of the Original Revolvers were subsequently published in Fanfare.

On a smaller scale the OR still performs by invitation only.

The band reformed as New Revolvers from late 1968.

Ronnie Pereira, a latecomer, was originally hired as bassist for his versatility with instruments and his level of discipline in playing. He progressed to the position of lead guitarist when Lee Lip Tiong left to go abroad to pursue higher study. Cheah Jin Sang, the band's manager and patron, consented to Ronnie Pereira taking over lead guitar on Lip Tiong's departure. Magness and Rozario also moved on at a similar time, with Tony (Bertie) Netto joining on keyboard and vocals prior to Freddie Fernandez joining the band on Netto's departure as the band's keyboard player and overall director of its musical direction.

Pereira survived many of the personnel changes and musical directions of the band in his time. He performed with them for 15 years until he left to pursue solo interests at the age of 33. Changes to the band's musical direction was only made possible largely because Pereira was a pillar of the group and a catalyst for cohesion and change within the band.

Balancing the egos of those that came and went was not easy although it came naturally to him. Never a bad word for anyone he knew regardless of their own sometimes uncomplimentary opinions of the man. He was unique as a person and more so as a musician.

The Revolvers grew in popularity for their carefully choreographed performances, tight three-part harmonies (relatively unknown at the time) selective well-rehearsed guitar instrumental breaks and their stage presence. Ronnie Pereira's ability to transform himself into any style of guitar player live on stage was a specific attraction to the band in those days. It was a quality that remained with him till his death in 2007.

The Revolvers were regulars in residence at the Glass Bubble in Jaya Puri Hotel, (now known as Petaling Jaya Hilton) and had another long-term residency at the Tin Mine at the old KL Hilton in the early 1970s. The Revolvers released three albums under the direction of Freddie Fernandez on their own label Beta Records.

Pereira was overshadowed by the enormous scope of Fernandez's commercial and musical ambitions both within the band and outside of it. Pereira was described as "introverted and shy". Freddie was "outgoing and self-assured", similarly talented with a greater nous for the business side of the industry. A great improviser, Pereira had a talent for picking up tunes and improvising, a skill not terribly appreciated in the Malaysian music scene at the time.

Pereira was a family man and did not wish to venture into the unknown yet lucrative world of commercial music in an emergent Malaysia of the 1980s. He preferred the security and intimacy of the club circuit and a regular 9–5 job to go with it. Although talented with the guitar (self taught) he was overshadowed by others and perhaps was his own obstacle to greater success.

Whilst some other members of the band went on to international acclaim in Australia like Tony Netto, the vocalist and keyboard player of the Revolvers during Ronnie's time, Pereira continued to play locally and hold down his full-time job as a lab assistant at the La Salle school in Kelang till retirement.

== Death ==
Pereira died October 13, 2006, at 5:40 a.m. at the Klang General Hospital due to complication from diabetes. He is survived by his wife Jane and daughter Leslie.
