= Xin Yan =

Malaysian Bossa Nova singer

Chinese name
- Traditional Chinese: 欣彥
- Hanyu Pinyin: Xīnyàn
- Jyutping: Jan1 Jin6
- Hokkien POJ: Him-gān
- Tâi-lô: Him-gān

Xin Yan (Chinese: 欣彦), now styled as Z Yan, is a Malaysian Chinese-language Bossa Nova singer from Melacca.

Her first album, of Mando pop, under the artist name Xin Yan was called Xinyuan (心愿 wish or desire), a word play on her own name, was released in 2007. Her second album Bossa Princess (芭莎公主) was released in 2010. The album is also listed in English as "Brasiliero" by "Z Yan" in Chinese Malaysian music magazines.
