= Nina Nadira =

Malaysian singer and television host

- نينا نادرة
- Born: Nina Nadira binti Naharuddin; 5 July 1992 (age 34); Shah Alam, Selangor, Malaysia
- Occupations: Singer, television host
- Years active: 2014–present

Nina Nadira binti Naharuddin (born 5 July 1992), is a Malaysian singer and television host. She is a former contestant of Akademi Fantasia 2014.

== Akademi Fantasia 2014 ==
=== Song list ===
The list of songs that are given to Nina during AF2014

- First Concert: "Gelora Jiwa" – original songs by P. Ramlee
- Second Concert: "Zombie" – original songs by The Cranberries
- Third Concert: "Ilusi" – original songs by Adira Suhaimi
- Fourth Concert: "Dondang Dendang" – original songs by Noraniza Idris
- Fifth Concert: "Ku Mohon" – original songs by Sheila Majid
- Sixth Concert: "Layar Impian" – original songs by Ella
- Seventh Concert: "Itulah Sayang" – original songs by P. Ramlee & Noormadiah
- Eighth Concert: "Rescue" – original songs by Yuna

Naharuddin was chosen as the best performance by the AF2014's principal through her performance, Zombie. She was eliminated on the 8th week of Af2014 with Zarif.

== Personal life ==
Nina marries architect Ahmad Farhan Rusman on 29 July 2017. They have a daughter named Nina Lillyana.

== Filmography ==
=== Drama ===
- 2014: Dee (Astro Ria) – as Ria, cameo
- 2015: M.A.I.D (Astro Ria) – as Iman
- 2016: Sesal Separuh Nyawa (HyppSensasi) – as Melissa
- 2016: Isteri Vs Tunang (Astro Ria) as Mia
- 2016: Akadku Yang Terakhir (Astro Prima) as Zalia

=== Telemovie ===
- 2015: M.A.I.D Pun Nak Raya (Astro Ria)
- 2015: Ketupat Jantung Hati (Astro Ria)

=== Television ===
- 2015: H!Live (Astro)
- 2015: VivoRazzi (Astro)
- 2016: Euromaxx (HyppTV)
- 2017: How Do I Look Asia (DIVA) – special guest

== Discography ==
- "Misteri"
