= David Knight (cricketer) =

Australian cricketer (born 1956)

Personal information
- Born: 21 August 1956 (age 70); Melbourne, Australia

Domestic team information
- Years: Team
- 1978: Victoria
- Source: Cricinfo, 6 December 2015

David Knight (born 21 August 1956) is an Australian former cricketer. He played one first-class cricket match for Victoria in 1978.

== See also ==
- List of Victoria first-class cricketers
