= Ahmad Zamil =

Malaysian singer, voice talent and actor

Zamil Idris زميل إدريس
- Born: Ahmad Zamil bin Mohd Idris; 23 April 1978 (age 48); Kuala Lumpur, Malaysia
- Occupations: Singer, television host, actor

Ahmad Zamil bin Mohd Idris or Zamil Idris (born 23 April 1978 in Kuala Lumpur) is a Malaysian singer, television host, master of ceremonies, voice talent and actor.

Zamil is best known as the Season 1 finalist of the popular Malaysian reality talent show, Malaysian Idol in 2004.

He is the grand nephew of veteran actor and the first Malay film director Haji Mahadi.

== Early life ==
Zamil Idris was born Ahmad Zamil bin Mohd Idris on 23 April 1978, in Kampung Dato Keramat, Kuala Lumpur, the son of Zawiyah Jaafar, a homemaker, and Mohd Idris Ibrahim, a former politician and businessman. He is the fifth child from six children.

From a very young age, Zamil was exposed to the arts through films, stage performances and musicals. He had the ability to mimic the characters and voices when watching movies, and the singer's voice when listening to the radio.

== Malaysian Idol ==
The first season of Malaysian Idol in 2004 was touted as the most talked about talent competition in Malaysia. Zamil, who was a bank officer at the time, was urged by his friends and colleagues to go for the audition. The audition took place at Berjaya Times Square Kuala Lumpur with more than 10,000 hopefuls. Zamil sang "The Prayer" by Andrea Bocelli and wowed all three judges Roslan Aziz, Fauziah Latiff and Paul Moss, which led him to be in Top 120 and eventually to Top 33.

In The Workshop (Top 33), Zamil sang "My Baby You" by Marc Anthony, instantly gaining praises by the judges and votes by the viewers, and secured his place in the Top 12.

Throughout the competition, Zamil showcased his vocal strength in singing ballads and was known as The Crooner.

Zamil was voted out on 5 September 2004 during the Rock Show after delivering his rendition of Hoobastank's "The Reason". He was eliminated for getting the lowest votes during The Rock Show. His "The Reason" was criticised by all three judges, although many viewers thought he did a decent performance compared to the other finalists. Many viewed that Zamil should have sung one of the classic rock numbers. He came seventh in the show.

Zamil's renditions in Malaysian Idol include:

- The Prayer by Andrea Bocelli in The Audition
- My Baby You by Marc Anthony in The Workshop (Top 33)
- Januari by Glenn Fredly in The First Spectacular (Top 12)
- Suratan atau Kebetulan by Kenny Remy & Martin in The Classics Show (Top 10)
- Just Once by James Ingram in The 80's Show (Top 8)
- The Reason by Hoobastank in The Rock Show (Top 7)

== Singing career ==
Zamil continued to perform for various events throughout Malaysia for corporate events, fashion shows, product launches, charitable causes, and weddings, usually singing popular songs from Andrea Bocelli, Josh Groban, Michael Buble and Anuar Zain.

He released his first single Pesanan Terakhirmu in 2014 in memory of this late father. The song was then chosen as one of the songs for the MH17 tragedy and shown on national television.

In August 2014, Zamil performed twice at the Kuala Lumpur Lake Gardens Festival. He was the opening act for Malaysian Queen of Jazz Dato' Sheila Majid and world-renowned pianist Richard Clayderman for "Joget in the Park". He was also one of the artistes to perform at the MH17 Tribute Concert, sharing the stage with Ning Baizura, Awi Rafael, Dato' Leonard Tan, Radhi OAG and Shanel Shanty.

== Television host ==
After Malaysian Idol, in 2005, Zamil was approached to audition as a talkshow host for Hello On Two, a 'live' English talkshow on RTM. Zamil was shortlisted and eventually chosen as one of the hosts. Zamil is currently hosting the show, marking his ninth year as a TV host of the program.

== Master of ceremonies ==
Zamil has been dubbed as "The Singing Emcee" due to his ability to host and entertain the audience with his singing. He has hosted various events throughout Malaysia including corporate annual dinners, product launches, roadshows and weddings.

== Acting career ==
In 2007, Zamil was cast as one of the seven main characters in a musical stage production called TUNKU The Musical at the Kuala Lumpur Performing Arts Center (KLPAC). Starring Tony Eusoff, Douglas Lim, Syuk Ibrahim, Zamil Idris, Doreen Tang, Evelyn Toh and Maria Yasmin, the musical has over 20 original compositions. Spoken dialogue is kept to a minimum as the thrust and dramatic flow of the play is expressed in song, dance and historical footage. The music is played live, on stage, by an estimated 25 piece orchestra. This is Zamil's debut as a stage actor. In TUNKU The Musical, Zamil plays Malik, the 20-year-old son of Syed (Tony Eusoff), an aide to Tunku Abdul Rahman. About to go abroad (to England) for his tertiary studies, Malik falls in love with 17-year-old Fauzia (Doreen Tang), a Chinese girl adopted by a Malay family. The music and lyrics for Tunku the Musical are written by Lim Chuang Yik and Teng Ky-Gan (who also did the score for the previous year's musical called Broken Bridges) while the musical director for TUNKU is Mervyn Peters. The play is directed by Joe Hasham.

== TV commercial and endorsement ==
In 2005, Zamil was chosen to appear in a TV Commercial by PLUS to promote their Touch-N-Go Card and Smart Tag campaign. In the commercial, he was paired with Malaysian Idol judge Roslan Aziz and drove a Lotus Elise racing on the highway against Roslan. Zamil was also chosen to be one of TM Net's ambassadors together with Idol alums Jaclyn Victor, Dina Nadzir, Vick Teo and Rydee.

== Secretaries Week ==
In 2007, Zamil was invited to perform for Secretaries Week, an event usually performed by recording artistes. Zamil performed for more than 800 guests at the Secretaries Week held at Renaissance Kota Bharu Hotel in Kelantan.

== Performing at Istana Budaya ==
In February 2008, Zamil performed twice at Istana Budaya. The first performance was at the Konsert Gala DiRaja in conjunction Federal Territory Day. The event was graced by the King and Queen, DYMM Al-Wathiqu Billah Tuanku Mizan Zainal Abidin Ibni Al-Marhum Sultan Mahmud Al-Muktafi Billah Shah and Raja Permaisuri Agong Tuanku Nu Zahirah. Artistes who performed include Dato' Yusni Hamid, Jaclyn Victor, Hazami, Liza Hanim, Dayang Nurfaizah & Fazli Zainal. All of whom are established recording artistes except Zamil.

The second performance was at the Konsert Barisan Budi Malaysia, in which he performed for the Prime Minister, Datuk Seri Abdullah bin Haji Ahmad Badawi and Datin Seri Jeanne Abdullah. Among the artistes who performed include Liza Hanim, Jaclyn Victor, Dayang Nurfaizah, Bob, Suki, Dina, Haziq, Asmidar and MK.

== Personal life ==
Zamil's father, who was diagnosed with liver cancer in 2005, died in May 2006.

== Discography ==
"Pesanan Terakhirmu" (2014, in memory of MH370 and MH17 tragedies)
