= Faridah Merican =

Malaysian actor, director, producer and dramaturge

- Born: 25 October 1939 (age 86); George Town, Penang, Malaysia
- Occupations: Actor; director; producer; dramaturge
- Spouse: Joe Hasham

(Datuk) Faridah Merican, born 25 October 1939, is a Malaysian actor, director, producer and dramaturge. she is known as the "Mother of Malaysian Performing Arts".

She started her career in broadcasting and advertising. Along with her husband, Australian actor/director Joe Hasham she co-foundered the Actors Studio (Malaysia), the Kuala Lumpur Performing Arts Centre, and the Performing Arts Centre of Penang (Penangpac).

== Early life and education ==
Merican grew up in George Town, Penang, and has credited her Penang childhood with her understanding of Hokkien and Cantonese. She attended St George Girls' School, where she first discovered an interest in the theatre. Her father, Basha Merican, taught English language and literature at the Penang Free School, and Merican initially trained to be a primary school teacher, specializing in Physical Education. While a student at the Kota Baru Teachers Training College, she appeared as Kate in a production of Shakespeare's The Taming of the Shrew.

== Career ==
In the 1960s she worked as a newsreader for Radio Malaysia, and hosted radio talk shows on theatre and advertising. From 1969 worked in props and casting for the advertising agency HS Benson.

She was a key figure in the postcolonial Malaysian theatre scene of the 1960s and 1970s, appearing in productions of Lela Mayang, Tok Perak, and Alang Rentak Seribu. She starred in the first production of the first Malay musical, Uda Dan Dara by Usman Awang, in 1972. She later appeared in a revival of the musical in 1984, and produced and directed subsequent productions of the same work in 2002 and 2015 respectively.

She has worked in Bahasa Malaysia, Hokkien and Cantonese, as both performer and director. She has appeared in two Malay productions of Chinese playwright Tsao Yu’s 1933 classic Thunderstorm, in 1983 and 2001, and directed productions of the play in English (2017) and in Hokkien and Cantonese (2019).

== Personal life ==
She is married to Australian actor and director Joe Hasham, with whom she co-founded the Actors Studio (Malaysia) in 1989. In 1995 they established a theatre space in Plaza Putra, Dataran Merdeka. Flooding destroyed the space in 2003 and they subsequently founded the Kuala Lumpur Performing Arts Centre. In 2011 they founded the Performing Arts Centre of Penang (Penangpac).

== Awards and accolades ==
Merican has received the Boh Cameronian Lifetime Achievement Award, the Ahli Mangku Negara, and an Outstanding Achievement Award in the Arts, Culture and Entertainment category in the inaugural Malaysian Women of Excellence Awards.

She received an Honorary Master of Letters from the University Sains Malaysia and an Honorary Doctorate in the Arts from Taylor's University. She is Adjunct Professor and Programme Development Director of TUTAS, Malaysia's first performing arts conservatory degree, jointly administered by the Actors Studio and Taylor's University.

In 2024, Merican was awarded the Education and Community award, a category under the Merdeka Award for pioneering the Malaysia's performing arts scene throughout her long standing career.
