= Dior (singer) =

Malaysian singer-songwriter (born 1999)

- Dior in 2026

Background information
- Born: Tan Jia Ying; February 26, 1999 (age 27); Rengit, Batu Pahat, Johor, Malaysia
- Origin: Malaysia
- Genre: Mandopop
- Occupations: Singer-songwriter; Record producer
- Years active: 2020–present
- Label: LostControl Sdn. Bhd. (2024–present)
- Website: lostcontrol.fun

Chinese name
- Traditional Chinese: 大穎
- Simplified Chinese: 大颖
- Hanyu Pinyin: Dàyǐng

Birth name
- Traditional Chinese: 陳佳瑩
- Simplified Chinese: 陈佳莹
- Hanyu Pinyin: Chén Jiāyǐng

Tan Jia Ying (Chinese: 陈佳莹; pinyin: Chén Jiāyǐng; born on February 26, 1999), known professionally as Dior (stylized in all caps; Chinese: DIOR大颖; pinyin: DIOR Dàyǐng) is a Malaysian singer-songwriter and record producer. She first rose to prominence in 2020 with her viral single, "Love Myself More" (爱自己更深), which launched her professional music career. Since then, she has released a number of original and collaborative tracks, and later established her own music studio, LostControl, to support her music production and creative work.

Dior has remained active primarily in Malaysia, with her music widely circulated across digital platforms. Notable tracks such as "Divorce in Ghana" (在加纳共和国离婚) and "If That Call Had Been Answered" (如果那通电话有接通) gained widespread popularity in China and were featured on major streaming platforms, also receiving recognition from music awards.

== Early life ==
Dior was raised in a family engaged in the audio equipment business. Influenced by her parents’ passion for singing, she developed a keen interest in music from an early age.

She made her first stage appearance in 2011, competing in the Hokkien singing competition Astro Hua Hee Karaoke. In 2016, she joined the national singing competition 绝对星光飙唱赛 organized by Easynote Studio and began posting cover songs online. After finishing high school that year, she joined a band and started performing as a bar singer, later signing with a seaside resort in Port Dickson.

In December 2019, she appeared on the Malaysian web reality show Produce KOL Trainee Musical, where she advanced to the finals

== Career ==
=== 2020–2022: Online Debut and Career Beginnings ===
On January 3, 2020, Dior won the TikTok Song Cover Challenge at the AIM Chinese Music Awards with her cover of "Still Friends" (依然是朋友), and was invited to open the ceremony.

Dior officially debuted on January 13, 2020, with the single "Love Myself More" (爱自己更深). Upon its release on Douyin and YouTube, the single quickly surpassed 400,000 streams within 24 hours, capturing widespread online and media attention.

Through a recommendation by Malaysian singer-songwriter KC PNG, she was invited to "Alone" (一个人), the theme song for the Chinese film Ladies in Beijing 4. With live shows halted during the COVID-19 pandemic, she shifted to online content, releasing the original single "How to Forgive" (该怎么原谅) and several cover tracks.

=== 2023–Present: Breakthrough and Gained Recognition Overseas ===
Following the pandemic, Dior resumed live performances, which during this period were primarily held as small-scale solo showcases. On February 26, 2023, her 24th birthday, she headlined her first solo show, I Want to Earn 1Million! in Johor Bahru, where she surprised the audience by offering a full ticket refund.

On August 14, 2023, Dior released her first collaborative single, "Divorce in Ghana" (在加纳共和国离婚) featuring Firdhaus Farmizi. The track immediately topped multiple major Chinese streaming-platform charts and became one of the breakthrough Mandarin singles of the year. Her first self-composed original song, "I've Been Better" (你最近过得好吗?), was released on December 12, 2023, in remembrance of her mother, who died in a car accident.

In May 2024, Dior released "If That Call Had Been Answered" (如果那通电话有接通), an original song honoring her late mother. Inspired by Dior’s real past experience, the music video captures both the immediate trauma and its lingering echo. The lyrics progress from regret and guilt through fond memories of her time with her mother, ending with acceptance and a final blessing. The song was later covered by Chinese singer Zhang Xincheng on the popular music variety show Singing with Legends Season 6. On December 4, "Divorce in Ghana" ranked as the second most-streamed Mandarin-language song on Spotify for the year. It was later named one of the Top 10 Golden Songs of the Year and included in the Trending Pop Playlist at the 2024 Soda Music & Douyin Music Awards, while "If That Call Had Been Answered" was also included in the Trending Pop Playlist.

Intending to further support her music production and creative projects, Dior announced the establishment of her personal studio, LostControl, on December 31, 2024. Following this, her original releases have primarily been issued under the studio’s copyright.

In 2025, Dior maintained an active schedule in live performances and related industry activities, appearing on multiple regional stages. On January 27, during Chinese New Year celebrations in Batu Pahat, Dior staged a mini showcase titled Messing With 80 Cents: Personal Spring Festival Gala (8毛钱皮在痒个人春晚大会). In June, Dior was selected as a Spotify EQUAL Asia ambassador for the month, with her profile featured on Spotify playlists in Singapore and Malaysia and on digital billboards in New York Times Square. In the same month, she traveled to London for a one-month professional training, during which she planned and held a free-entry solo showcase.

On July 4, Dior made her debut performance of original works in Singapore at the Sundown Festival as the only invited Malaysian singer. On August 8, 8TV Starfluencer Awards 2025 she received four awards, which are Top 30 Starfluencer, Top 10 Chinese Song for "If That Call Had Been Answered" and "See You" (有天会再相见), and Top 10 Chinese New Year Song for "Le You You" (乐油油). By winning four awards, she became one of the biggest winners of the night. She also held her first unannounced solo showcase in Taiwan as a small-scale live performance on November 17.

On December 13 of the same year, Dior held her first solo concert since her debut, Kampung Girl, at the Arena of Stars, Genting Highlands. Before the concert began, she announced that she would officially launch the Kampung Girl World Tour next year. The Sarawak stop is scheduled for March 14, 2026, followed by a performance in Singapore on March 28. Other tour cities include Taipei, Bali, London, and Melbourne, among others.

=== 2026: Began World Tour ===
On March 14, 2026, Dior performed at the Miri Indoor Stadium in Miri, Sarawak for the Kampung Girl World Tour Sarawak stop. This concert marked the first show of the world tour. To make the show in Miri same as the one in Genting, she and the organizer transported the stage lift all the way from Kuala Lumpur, making sure local fans could enjoy a production on the same scale as the Genting performance. During the concert, she performed "Dear My Crush" (给我的Crush) and "Lifetime of Us" (人的这一生) live for the first time, with the latter marking its first live performance since the song's official release. The concert perform lasted over three hours.

Following the Sarawak stop, the Singapore stop of the Kampung Girl World Tour was held on March 28 at The Star Theatre. This concert was the first overseas stop of the tour and marked Dior’s first solo overseas concert. During the performance, she sang several exclusive songs, including "Like Sunday, Like Rain" (像晴天像雨天), "Like a Swallow" (如燕) and "The Next Dawn" (下一个天亮). She also shared her past experiences and anecdotes in Singapore. Besides, she mentioned that her next Singapore concert will be held at the Singapore Indoor Stadium.

The tour later continued to Taipei, with shows held on April 16 and 17 at Zepp New Taipei. Tickets sold out quickly, leading to the addition of an extra show on April 16. Her singles "Save Some" (节约用爱), "See You" and "If That Call Had Been Answered", achieved high streaming numbers in Taiwan, gradually building a local listener base. On the first day, she performed a new single, "Mutual Friends" (靠关系), which was her third collaboration with Alex Chang Jie. The music video surpassed 1 million views on YouTube within 8 days of its release. On the second day, she performed "Almost, But Still Here" (欲落未落), an unreleased song, marking its first live performance.

Following the Taipei stop, she held the Bali stop on June 6 at Lotus Pond, GWK, in Bali, Indonesia. The Bali performance marked Dior's first outdoor solo concert. She also became the first Malaysian Chinese singer to stage a solo concert on the island. To accommodate the outdoor venue environment, the concert production team redesigned the stage and visual effects, utilising the hillsides on both sides of the venue for large-scale projection displays, and adjusted about 50% of the performance repertoire. During the finale, a firework display was presented as a closing segment of the show. On June 13, she performed at the 21st KKBOX Music Awards at Taipei Arena, where she also received the Top 100 Artists award. That evening, in addition to performing her signature songs, she performed a collaboration stage with Trevor Kuo marking their first live performance in Taiwan of "A Few Days" (过了几天). The song previously reached No. 1 on YouTube trending in Malaysia, Singapore, and Taiwan, while its music video surpassed 10 million views within four months of release. It later entered the top 10 of the 2025 KKBOX Top Mandarin Yearly Singles Chart. On June 27, the Penang stop was held at SPICE Arena. Penang was where Dior began her music career and made her debut. During the performance, in addition to performing exclusive songs, she performed her new single "She Is Not That Girl Anymore" (她已不再是那个女孩) live for the first time. The song entered No. 4 on the KKBOX Top Mandarin Weekly New Singles Chart in its first week of release.

== Discography ==
=== Singles ===
List of singles, with details and selected chart positions
Title	Details	Lyricist	Composer	Note
"Love Myself More" (爱自己更深)	Released: January 13, 2020; Label: Music Bravo	KC PNG	KC PNG	Debut Work
"How to Forgive" (该怎么原谅)	Released: June 10, 2020; Label: Music Bravo	KC PNG	KC PNG	
"More Love This New Year" (新的一年更有爱)	Released: January 1, 2022; Label: Muar Yuen Chen Siang	Dior	Dior	Chinese New Year Single
"Divorce in Ghana" (在加纳共和国离婚) (with Firdhaus Farmizi)	Released: August 14, 2023; Label: Loolala Music	Firdhaus	Firdhaus	
"I've Been Better" (你最近过得好吗？)	Released: December 12, 2023; Label: DANG Studio	Dior	Dior	Dior's First Original Single
"Happy Go Lucky" ft. GoHell Holiday	Released: January 1, 2024; Label: DANG Studio	Dior, Daniel	Dior, Daniel	Chinese New Year Single
"If That Call Had Been Answered" (如果那通电话有接通)	Released: May 12, 2024; Label: DANG Studio	Dior	Dior	
"See You" (有天会再相见)	Released: September 2, 2024; Label: DANG Studio	Dior	Dior	
"Go Slow to Go Fast" (花期不同)	Released: October 10, 2024; Label: DANG Studio	Dior, Daniel	Dior	
"Telepathy" (with Priscilla Abby)	Released: November 29, 2024; Label: Warner Music Taiwan / Prodigee Asia Talent	Gaston Pong, Chris M. Yong, Priscilla Abby	Gaston Pong, Chris M. Yong, Priscilla Abby	
"A Few Days" (过了几天) (with Trevor Kuo)	Released: December 22, 2024; Label: JSJ International Entertainment	Trevor Kuo	Trevor Kuo	Duet Version; 2025 KKBOX Top 100 Madarin Songs (No. 10)
"Yi Qi Le Tuan Yuan" (一七乐团圆) ft. GoHell Holiday	Released: January 1, 2025; Label: LostControl	Dior, Daniel	Dior, Daniel	Chinese New Year Single
"Le You You" (乐油油) ft. Dior's Family	Released: January 10, 2025; Label: LostControl	Dior, Daniel	Dior, Daniel	Chinese New Year Single
"See Kin Nah" (阿呆)	Released: February 26, 2025; Label: LostControl	Dior	Dior	
"YOLO" (人醒着不过一万多天)	Released: March 31, 2025; Label: LostControl	Dior, Daniel, 兔子爱吃蒜	Dior, Daniel	
"Save Some" (节约用爱)	Released: June 3, 2025; Label: Sony Taiwan Music	Alex Chang Jien, Dior	Alex Chang Jien	2025 KKBOX Top 100 Mandarin Songs (No. 26)
"Proud Of Myself"	Released: August 9, 2025; Label: LostControl	Dior	Dior	
"LOUISE" (with Louise)	Released: September 9, 2025; Label: LostControl	Dior	Dior	Dior's First Original English Single
"John's Bar" (with Elliot Cox)	Released: October 20, 2025; Label: LostControl	Elliot Cox, Kelsey Berrington	Elliot Cox, Kelsey Berrington	English Single; Duet Version
"Adult Joy" (大人的快乐)	Released: November 14, 2025; Label: Sony Taiwan Music	Alex Chang Jien	Alex Chang Jien	
"Dear My Crush" (给我的Crush)	Released: November 14, 2025; Label: LostControl	Dior	Dior, Zi Xuen	
"Kampung Girl 普通人"	Released: December 1, 2025; Label: LostControl	Dior	Dior	Dior's Concert Theme Song
"LOSTCONTROL" (我要发疯) (with Jess佳仙)	Released: December 16, 2025; Label: 鲸鱼向海	未子夫	未子夫	Cover by Dior; Original: 六仔哥
"Spring Breeze Arive My Kampung" (春风来到我Kampung) ft. Dior's Family	Released: January 30, 2026; Label: LostControl	Dior, Daniel, WeiC, Yee Xing	Dior, Daniel, WeiC, Yee Xing	Chinese New Year Single
"Lifetime of Us" (人的这一生)	Released: February 20, 2026; Label: LostControl	Dior, Daniel	Dior, Daniel	3 Good Guys OST
"Out of Place" (脱臼) (with Feng Ze)	Released: March 4, 2026; Label: Reason Entertainment	Feng Ze, David Kuo	Feng Ze, Hoong	
"Mutual Friends" (靠关系)	Released: April 14, 2026; Label: Sony Music Taiwan	Alex Chang Jien, Dior	Alex Chang Jien	
"She Is Not That Girl Anymore" (她已不再是那个女孩)	Released: June 29, 2026; Label: LostControl	Dior	Dior	
"Almost, But Still Here" (欲落未落)	Released: October 26, 2026; Label: LostControl	Dior	Dior	
"Thought We Would Marry" (我以为我们会结婚) (with Trevor Kuo)	Released: November 22, 2026; Label: LostControl	Trevor Kuo, Dior	Trevor Kuo, Dior	

=== Soundtrack appearances ===
List of singles, with year released and name of the album
Title	Year	Album	Note
"Alone" (一个人)	2020	Ladies in Beijing OST	Movie; Theme Song
"Paper Butterfly" (纸蝴蝶)	2024	In Between OST	Web Series; Insert Song
"Lifetime of Us" (人的这一生)	2026	3 Good Guys OST	Movie; Insert Song

== Concert ==
- Single concert

KAMPUNG GIRL
Date	Country	City	Venue	Note
December 13, 2025	Malaysia	Genting Highlands	Arena Of Star	First solo concert

- Tour

KAMPUNG GIRL World Tour
Date	Country	City	Venue	Note
March 14, 2026	Malaysia	Miri	Miri Indoor Stadium	
March 28, 2026	Singapore	Singapore	The Star Theatre	
April 16–17, 2026	Taiwan	Taipei	Zepp New Taipei	
June 6, 2026	Indonesia	Bali	Lotus Pond, GWK	
June 27, 2026	Malaysia	Penang	SPICE Arena	
August 25, 2026	Australia	Sydney	Roundhouse	
August 27, 2026	Australia	Melbourne	Forum Theatre	
September 2, 2026	United Kingdom	London	Clapham Grand	
October 3–4, 2026	Hong Kong	Hong Kong	Macpherson Stadium	
December 12–13, 2026	Malaysia	Kuala Lumpur	Unifi Arena	

== Filmography ==
=== Variety shows ===
List of variety shows, with year aired, character played and channel
Year	Variety show	Role	Channel	Ref.
2019	Produce KOL Trainee Musical	Contestant	Stardust Online TV, JOOX Malaysia	
2021	Yeah Pay! S2	Contestant	Astro AEC、Xuan	
2024	Family Singing Show S5	Contestant	8TV、Tonton	
2024	The Music Journey EP4	Guest Star	Astro AEC, Sooka	
2024	The Greatest of Us S2	Special Guest	8TV、Tonton	
2024	Let's Go, Big Shots!	Headlining Singer	Astro AEC, Sooka	

=== Film ===
List of films, with year aired and character played
Year	Film	Role	Notes	Ref.
2025	Money Games	Live Streaming Influencer	Cameo appearance	
2026	3 Good Guys	Tuk-tuk Driver	Cameo appearance	
