= Gordon Teoh =

- Born: 7 May 1974
- Origin: Malaysia
- Genres: R&B, folk, pop/rock, hip-hop
- Occupations: Singer, songwriter, composer
- Instrument: Guitar
- Years active: 1996–present
- Labels: EMI Music (1996–1998), ZCN Music/Sony BMG (2004)
- Website: zhangjuelong.com

Chinese name
- Traditional Chinese: 張覺隆
- Simplified Chinese: 张觉隆
- Hanyu Pinyin: Zhāng Juélóng
- Hokkien POJ: Tiuⁿ Kak-liông

Gordon Teoh (張覺隆; born 7 May 1974), also known as Zhang Juelong, is a Malaysian composer and entertainer. He is also a music producer with experience in music technologies and techniques. Teoh has composed, arranged, and produced music in styles ranging from pop/rock, R&B, folk, and TV/radio musicals to world music, ambient/experimental music, and dance music.

He has written hit songs for Daniel Lee Chee Hun (Malaysian Idol Season 2 winner), namely "Are You Happy On Your Birthday?" (你的生日快樂嗎？; Nǐ De Shēngrì Kuàilè Ma?), "Organic Love" (有機; Yǒu Jī) and "I Love To See You Now" (現在，很想見你; Xiànzài, Hěn Xiǎng Jiàn Nǐ).

== Awards ==
- 1996 The Best Newcomer
- 1996 Malaysia Top Ten Artist
- 1997 321 Action Awards The Best Newcomer
- 1998 AIM Awards The Best Male Artist
- 1998 Malaysia Top Ten Artist
- 1998 321 Action Awards Top Ten Creation Song "篮球教练"
- 1999 Malaysia Top Ten Artist
- 1999 The Best Composer "廉价的灯"
- 2000 PWH Awards The Best Song of the Year "因为我蓝"
- 2001 Millennium Singer Awards "千禧年之星"
- 2002 PWH Awards The Best Kids Song of the Year "全班第一名"
- 2004 PWH Awards Top Ten Creation Song "我是酱的咯"
- 2004 Red Box The Best Improvement Artist of the Year
- 2005 Malaysia Top Ten Artist
- 2006 PWH Awards Top Ten Creation Song "有机"

== Discography ==
- 1996 自我流放 EMI Music 发行
- 1997 。。这就是生活。。EMI Music 发行
- 1998 蓝 EMI Music 发行
- 2002 我就是酱的咯 滚石唱片发行
- 2004 关键时刻 ZCN Music/Sony BMG 发行

== Product/event endorsement ==
- 1998 Salem Cool Planet Malaysia Live Tour
- 2002 XES 鞋子连锁 XES Appeal
- 2004 大马元首杯篮球宣传大使
- 2004 Haier
- 2004 Society for the Prevention of Cruelty to Animals
