= David L. Knight =

American politician (1950–2007)

Member of the New Hampshire House of Representatives from the Cheshire 9th district
- In office 1974–1976

Personal details
- Born: February 13, 1950
- Died: October 28, 2007 (aged 57)
- Party: Republican
- Education: Keene State College

David L. Knight (February 13, 1950 – October 28, 2007) was an American politician. He served as a Republican member for the Cheshire 9th district of the New Hampshire House of Representatives.

== Life and career ==
Knight attended Marlborough High School and Keene State College.

In 1974, Knight defeated Roland E. Mitchell in the general election for the Cheshire 9th district of the New Hampshire House of Representatives, winning 68 percent of the votes.

Knight died on October 28, 2007, at the age of 57.
