= David Knight (musician) =

American singer-songwriter

- Birth name: David Lloyd Knight
- Born: October 24, 1978 (age 46)
- Origin: San Jose, California, USA
- Genres: Ambient, electronic, alternative
- Instrument(s): Vocals, guitar, keyboards, sampler, bass, drums and percussion, sequencing
- Years active: 2000–present
- Website: music.sleepcomabath.com

David Lloyd Knight (born October 24, 1978) is an American singer-songwriter, composer, and music producer. His music is a fusion of acoustic and electronic elements, blending self-produced live and sampled music with multiple instruments.

He was the lead singer of ambient rock band Day One Symphony until early 2008, when the group disbanded. He has continued to release music as a solo artist, and joined the band Low Roar in 2017 as a touring member. In 2021, Knight began releasing music with former Day One Symphony drummer Steve Barry under the name Jymno.

== Career ==
=== Musical beginnings ===
Knight has a BA in Audio Production from San Francisco State University. In 2002, he helped form Day One Symphony. The four-member band went on to enjoy a steady growth of popularity in the Bay Area. In 2005, the band released an EP titled A Vicious Circle and went on tour with dredg and Circa Survive. Aaron Axelsen, music director at LIVE 105.3, played tracks from the EP and invited the band to play on air and participate in some Bay Area concerts.

In May 2006, while on their way to a dredg concert in San Francisco, the members of the band met with a road accident. Knight, who was driving, suffered a broken leg and collapsed lung while the rest sustained injuries leading all of them to be hospitalised. The car crash forced the cancellation of the band's scheduled appearance at LIVE 105's annual BFD concert at Shoreline Amphitheater.

Unable to regroup after the trauma of the accident, Day One Symphony disbanded in early 2008.

=== Solo works ===
In 2008, Knight began to create his own music, blending acoustic and electronic instruments. A one-month trip to Malaysia, in which he performed his new music and collaborated with local singer-songwriter Jerome Kugan in Kuala Lumpur, and attended the Rainforest World Music Festival in Kuching, left him inspired and propelled him to hone his solo music.

He released his first solo EP titled Mandala over three parts online from late 2008 to early 2009, capturing his experience in the Asian country and his journey as a solo independent musician.

Before returning to Kuala Lumpur for a tour in late 2009, Knight released a five-track EP titled The Sensation of Flying that brings the storytelling quality of his music to the forefront with a focus on breezy melodies and their accompanying words.

Knight's music combines his expertise in electronic programming with his skills as a multi-instrumentalist. A typical live performance sees him surrounded by an assortment of equipment including guitar, sampler, kalimba and flute on stage. The result is an integration of homemade samples, live looping and vocal layering.

== The Malaysia connection ==
In Malaysia, Knight has become a familiar name in the Kuala Lumpur singer-songwriter circuit. He has performed in notable music festivals, such as the annual KL Sing Song and Moonshine, as well as popular music venues including No Black Tie, Cloth and Clef and Laundry. Some of his solo shows featured collaborations with Malaysian singer-songwriters Jerome Kugan and Yuna. To date, he has toured Malaysia twice.

In 2007, Knight produced music for the stage adaptation of Edgar Allan Poe’s The Tell-Tale Heart directed by Gavin Yap and staged at the Kuala Lumpur Performing Arts Centre.

== Discography ==
=== Albums ===
- Mandala (2008)
- Isles (2018)
- Only Shadows (Jymno) (2021)
- Pelangi (2022)

=== EPs ===
- A Vicious Circle (Day One Symphony) (2005)
- Lost EP (Day One Symphony) (2007)
- Ambient Works 2003-07
- Collected Works 2005-08
- The Sensation of Flying (2009)
- Evacuate (2010)

=== Singles ===
- Rounds (Jymno) (2020)
- Blue Light Dream (Jymno) (2021)
- Free Fall (remix) (Jymno) (2021)
- Destroyer (2022)
- Mantra (2022)
