= M-Girls =

Malaysian girl group

- Origin: Malaysia
- Genres: Mandopop; Hokkien pop Chinese new year songs
- Years active: 2001–2010; 2013–2017
- Labels: Wayang Tinggi (2001–2008); Starmedia (2009–2015); MG Entertainment (2016–2017)
- Past members: Queenzy Cheng (deceased); Angeline Khoo; Cass Chin; Crystal Ong
- Website: Wayback Archive

Chinese name
- Traditional Chinese: 四個女生
- Simplified Chinese: 四个女生
Transcriptions
Standard Mandarin
- Hanyu Pinyin: Sì gè Nǚshēng
Yue: Cantonese
- Jyutping: Sei3 Go3 Neoi5-saang1
Southern Min
- Hokkien POJ: Sì-ê Lú-seng

M-Girls (Chinese: 四个女生) were a Malaysian girl group consisting of Queenzy Cheng, Angeline Khoo, Cass Chin and Crystal Ong. The group was formed in 2001.

The group released over 20 studio albums under Starmedia Entertainment, primarily featuring festive pop arrangements of traditional Mandopop and Hokkien pop songs. Their albums saw distribution across Malaysia, Singapore, Indonesia, and Chinese diaspora markets.

Although M-Girls studio albums have been officially released in many different parts of the world, the group has been a longstanding victim to piracy and unlicensed, illegal distribution significantly impacted revenue, with Starmedia estimating 80% of their albums were illegally reproduced during peak years. As a result, the group's music company, Starmedia, decided to stop producing additional M-Girls albums in 2014. This announcement came out during the release of the Chinese New Year album True Happiness (真歡喜) in February 2014, weeks after the release of their EP, My Way.

In 2015, M-Girls released one last CNY album, New Spring Holiday (新春佳期), through Starmedia. Afterwards, the group later on decided to part ways with the music company and established their own company, MG Entertainment. This new company's first album release was entitled The New Year is Coming (年來了), which came out in 2016.

As of 2017, the members of M-Girls are taking a break from working together as a group and would not be producing any albums together. Instead, everyone is currently pursuing solo projects and endeavors for the time being.

In November 2023, Cheng died at the age of 37 while filming a video production.

== Career ==
=== Pre-debut ===
Prior to the group's formation, all members originally were under Ya-Ko Enterprise, with Khoo debuting in 7-member girl group known as Seven Fairies (七仙女).

=== 2001–2005: Debut and Chin's departure ===
M-Girls debuted in 2001 with the Chinese New Year Song, "Happily Welcoming the Harvest Year" (開心迎接豐收年). It set sales records and sold over 50,000 copies, receiving platinum status. In 2004, M-Girls released a Chinese New Year album with Four Golden Princess titled "Flowers Blossom in the Spring" (春風催花開). Their title music video set a new Malaysia Book of Records at the time for the most number of lion dancers in a music video with 108 lion dancers. The former record holding music video had 88 which was shot around two years before. In 2005, with the release of "Happy Year" (開心年) which was filmed in Australia, Chin announced that she would leave the group to concentrate on her studies.

=== 2005–2012: "Nile River" and Cheng's departure ===
After Chin left, M-Girls released "Nile River" (尼罗河) in 2005, becoming their last mandopop album release until "My Way". After the release of their 2010 Chinese New Year album "Abundant Wealth" (金玉满堂), Cheng left the group following the end of her contract with the company.

=== 2014: "True Happiness", "New Spring Holiday", appearance on Nick & Stella & "The New Year Is Coming" ===
On 27 November 2014, their 2014 Chinese New Year album "True Joy" (眞歡喜) was shown on Starmedia Distribution, which was known as Wayang Tinggi Corporation back then. Its distribution is from PMP Entertainment. One day later, pre-release was announced for their new Chinese New Year album. This would be M-Girls' final Chinese New Year album as their albums are heavily shared online, which affected their album sales, causing Starmedia to stop producing their Chinese New Year albums.

On 23 February 2015, M-Girls had their final concert for Hai-O at the HGC Convention Centre in Malaysia. After mass online speculation, it was revealed that they will indeed release Chinese New Year 2015 album "New Spring Holiday" (新春佳期). This year for the first time M-Girls cover an English song called Happy CNY, and also a Hokkien song called 發大財 which translates to fortune.

Filming for their 2016 Chinese New Year album began on 8 September 2015. Recording started the previous month. Angeline and Crystal also made an appearance in Nick and Stella Chung's CNY album, "New Year Reunion" (新年團圓). The advertisement of the release of their latest Chinese New Year album titled "年來了" which translates to Year is Coming was released on 21 November 2015. This is the first time they have released an album since they left their former company Starmedia.

In 2017, it was announced that M-Girls would take a break to focus on solo activities.

=== Members ===
- Queenzy Cheng (莊群施) (2001–2010, 2013–2017; died 2023)
- Angeline Khoo (阿妮) (2001–2010, 2013–2017)
- Cass Chin (燕子) (2001–2005, 2013–2017)
- Crystal Ong (王雪晶) (2001–2010, 2013–2016)

== Albums ==
=== Non-Chinese New Year albums ===
Album title	Release date
Dance with Me	2001
Playful Tricks (耍花样)	2003
Silly Goldfish (笨金魚)	2004
Love Code (愛情密碼) (Karaoke VCD)	2004
Nile River (尼罗河)	2005
M-Girls EP (M-Girls 四个女生 同名迷你专辑)	2013

=== Chinese New Year albums ===
Album title	Release date	Notes
Happily Welcoming the Harvest Year (開心迎接丰收年)	2001	
Leaping New Year (飛跃新年)	2002	
New Year Yeah! (新年 Yeah!)	2003	featuring Nick, Winnie
Spring Breeze and Blooming Flowers (春風催花開)	2004	featuring Four Golden Princess
Happy Year (開心年)	2005	
Have Fun Together (同歡共樂)	2006	featuring Four Golden Princess
Paradise (世外桃源)	2007	featuring Four Golden Princess, Sha Jia Wei
Good Day (好日子)	2007	featuring Eight Superstars
Fu Lu Shao Xing/Flower Fairy (福禄寿星拱照/花仙子)	2008	featuring Kint, Milk, Prince
Peach Blossom (桃花開了)	2009	
Full of Gold and Jade (金玉满堂)	2010	
Reunion (團聚)	2013	
Very Happy (真歡喜)	2014	
New Spring Holiday (新春佳期)	2015	
Through the Years (年來了)	2016	
Red New Year (过年要红红)	2017	

=== Other albums ===
Prior to the formation of M-Girls, the members started producing albums at the age of around 6–10 years old. Listed are the albums that they released before the group formation, and also other albums not as the group M-Girls. All Chinese New Year albums are produced months before the release date, but are released for the next year.

==== Queenzy Cheng ====
- 1995. 雙星報喜 Vol.1 Double Stars Bring Luck Vol.1 (feat. Crystal Ong)
- 1995. 雅歌群星龍獅會 Ya-Ko Stars Lion Dance (feat. Crystal Ong and other Ya-Ko artists)
- 1995. 金童玉女 Golden Girl and Pearl (feat. Su Li Da)
- 1996. 賣餛飩 Selling Wonton (Queenzy Solo Album)
- 1996. 雙星報喜 Vol.2 Double Stars Bring Luck Vol.2 (feat. Crystal Ong)
- 1996. 雅歌群星賀新年 Ya-Ko Stars Celebrate the New Year (feat. Ya-Ko artists)
- 1996. 花花絮絮 Highlights (Queenzy & Crystal)
- 1997. 新春嘉年華 Chinese New Year Carnival (feat. Chen Jia Lin)
- 1997. 神奇電腦 Magical Computer (Queenzy Solo Album)
- 1998. 三星報喜 Three Stars Bring Luck (feat. Guo Su Yun and Xu Jing Yi)
- 1999. 兔氣揚眉慶豐年 Tu Qi Yang Mei Qing Feng Nian (feat. Crystal Ong and Cassandra Chin)
- 1999. 山歌黃梅調 Huang Mei Diao Mountain Songs (feat. Crystal Ong and Cassandra Chin)
- 2000. 三星拱照慶龍年 Three Stars Celebrate the Year of the Dragon (feat. Crystal Ong and Cassandra Chin)
- 2000. 民謠 Folk Songs 2 in 1 (feat. Crystal Ong and Cassandra Chin)
- 2012. 年味 Festive (feat. Wei Wei)
- 2017. 愛 Don't be Shy Love: Don't be Shy (feat. Tom)
- 2018. 今年你最好 You Are The Best!
- 2018. Salam Aidilfitri (Digital Single)
- 2019. 招财进宝 Lucky Fortune (Digital Single) (With Crystal Ong)
- 2019. 春天的愿望 Spring Wishes
- 2019. 回家过年 Home for Lunar New Year (feat. TR Chen and Melody)
- 2019. Harapan Aidilfitri (Digital Single)
- 2020. 春风笑了 Joyful Spring Breeze
- 2020. Kemenangan Aidilfitri (Digital Single)
- 2021. 牛起来 Happy Niu Year
- 2021. Melodi Aidilfitri (Digital Single feat. Veron Lin of Q-Genz)
- 2022. 好好好 Good, Better, Best!
- 2022. Ü虎加把劲 Ü Tiger Work Harder (feat. My Astro)
- 2022. Lebaran Aidilfitri (Digital Single)
- 2023. 兔年回家快乐 Happy Homecoming
- 2023. Indahnya Aidilfitri (Digital Single)
- 2023. 一跃前进 旺兔 GOLD Leap Forward Prosperous GOLD Rabbit (feat. My Astro)
- 2024. 开心龙龙Way Happy Dragons 2024 (feat. My Astro)
- 2024. 好运气 Good Luck (Digital Single)
- 2024. Keluarga Aidilfitri (Digital Single)
- 2024. Syawal Aidilfitri (Digital Single)

==== Angeline Khoo ====
- 1993. 古代經典名曲 Ancient Classics (Seven Fairies 七仙女)
- 1993. 回顧93’熱門龍虎榜 93 Pick of the Pops (Seven Fairies 七仙女)
- 1994. 仙女下凡賀新歲 Fairy Lunar New Year (Seven Fairies 七仙女)
- 1994. 校園民謠 Vol.1 Campus Folk Vol.1 (Seven Fairies 七仙女)
- 1994. 校園民謠 Vol.2 Campus Folk Vol.2 (Seven Fairies 七仙女)
- 1994. 校園民謠 Vol.3 Campus Folk Vol.3 (Seven Fairies 七仙女)
- 1995. 中國95新年山歌黃梅調 China 95 Huang Mei Diao Mountain Chinese New Year Songs (Seven Fairies 七仙女)
- 1995. 94回顧龍虎榜 94 94 Pick of the Pops (Seven Fairies 七仙女)
- 1995. 校園民謠 Vol.4 Campus Folk Vol.4 (Seven Fairies 七仙女)
- 1995. 展現精粹名曲 Post-Production Album (Seven Fairies 七仙女)
- 1995. 歡天喜地 Vol.1 Bliss Vol.1
- 1995. 歡天喜地 Vol.2 Bliss Vol.2
- 1996. 24首串燒cha-cha迎新年 24 Non-Stop Cha-cha New Year Songs (feat. Ting Ting of Seven Fairies and Happy Little Angels)
- 1996. 懷念天皇巨星鄧麗君之歌 Songs to Remember Teresa Teng (feat. Ting Ting of Seven Fairies)
- 1996. 福建古早歌 Old Hokkien Songs (feat. Ting Ting of Seven Fairies)
- 1996. 福建燒滾滾 Hot Hokkien Songs (feat. Ting Ting of Seven Fairies)
- 1996. 24首串燒Cha-cha鄧麗君名曲 24 Non-Stop Teresa Teng Cha-cha Songs (feat. Ting Ting of Seven Fairies)
- 1997. 福建新年歌 Hokkien New Year Songs
- 1997. 三代仙女同慶新年 Three Generations of Fairies New Year's Celebration
- 1997. 歡天喜地 Vol.3 Bliss Vol.3
- 1997. 知心朋友 True Friend
- 1998. 新年金曲和新歲 Golden New Year Songs
- 1999. 天皇童星攜手賀新年 Great Child Stars Join to Celebrate the New Year (feat. Cassandra Chin and Crystal Ong)
- 1999. 夢幻舞台 Dream Stage
- 2000. 麗聲雙星報喜 Soundlife Double Stars Bring Luck (feat. Ting Ting of Seven Fairies)
- 2000. 龍獅鼓迎慶千禧年 Lion Dance Welcoming the New Millennium (feat. Soundlife Stars)
- 2000. 福建經典名曲對對唱 Classic Hokkien Duet (feat. Crystal Ong)
- 2002. 福建古早歌 Old Hokkien Songs
- 2011. 舞動春天 Dancing Spring (Three Trump Cards 三大皇牌)
- 2012. 四海歡騰 Whole World Celebration (Three Trump Cards 三大皇牌)
- 2013. 穿越新年 Cross The New Year (feat. Nick Chung)
- 2012. I am Solo (EP)
- 2016. 新年團圓 New Year Reunion (feat. Nick and Stella Chung)
- 2018. 喜臨大地幸福來 Happiness Comes To The Earth
- 2018. 新年無限好 Perfect New Year (feat. Nick and Stella Chung)
- 2019. 恭喜发财利是来 Congratulations Lucky Money Coming (Angeline 阿妮)
- 2019. 新年快樂我的愛 Happy New Year My Love (feat. Nick and Stella Chung)
- 2020. 浓浓新年庆团圆 Strong New Year Reunion
- 2020. 八面威風 Prestigious Dimension (feat. Eight Superstars 八大巨星)
- 2021. 春天*打满好运气 Spring * Good Luck
- 2022. 团团和圆圆 Tuan Tuan and Yuan Yuan
- 2022. 五谷丰登 Good Harvest (feat. Crystal Ong)
- 2022. 春节新年好 Good New Year Spring Festival (feat. Raymond Ng)
- 2022. 亲爱的她｜甜蜜情歌 1.0 Dear Her｜Sweet Love Song 1.0 (feat. Raymond Ng)
- 2023. 发发发发发 Send Send Send Send Send
- 2023. 名扬四海旺盛年 Year of Fame and Prosperity (feat. Raymond Ng)
- 2023. 迎春争辉唱新年 Welcoming the Spring Festival and Singing the New Year (feat. Five Lucky Stars)
- 2023. 今夜星光 Starlight tonight (Single)
- 2024. 桃花开开开 Peach blossoms are blooming
- 2024. 龙年显威风 The Year of the Dragon Shows Prestige (feat. Three Lucky Stars)
- 2025. 蛇兄弟 Snake Brothers
- 2025. 一家大小熱鬧鬧 The Whole Family Is Bustling (feat. Three Lucky Stars)
- 2025. 好运步步高 Good Luck is Increasing Step by Step (Digital Single) (feat. Nancy Sit, Aniu, Alann Tan, Jaspers Lai)
- 2026. 发大财 Make A Fortune
- 2026. 万马冲冲冲 (feat. Three Lucky Stars)
- 2027.福气

==== Cassandra Chin ====
- 1997. 飛燕登陸 Flying Swallow
- 1997. 雙星再報喜 Lucky Double Stars Again (feat. Crystal Ong)
- 1998. 雙星報雙喜 Double Stars Bring Double Luck (feat. Crystal Ong)
- 1999. 天皇童星攜手賀新年 Greatest Child Stars Join to Celebrate the New Year (feat. Angeline Khoo and Crystal Ong)
- 1999. 兔氣揚眉慶豐年 Rabbits Celebrates the Harvest Year (feat. Queenzy Cheng and Crystal Ong)
- 1999. 山歌黃梅調 Huang Mei Diao Mountain Songs (feat. Queenzy Cheng and Crystal Ong)
- 2000. 三星拱照慶龍年 Three Stars Celebrate the Year of the Dragon (feat. Queenzy Cheng and Crystal Ong)
- 2000. 民謠 Folk Songs 2 in 1 (feat. Queenzy Cheng and Crystal Ong)
- 2023. 兔年回家快乐 Rabbit Year Happy Homecoming (feat. Queenzy Cheng)
- 2024. High Five CNY
- 2025. 新年来来来 New Year Come Come Come (feat. Nick Chung, Stella Chung)
- 2025. 喜乐乐 SHARE 丰年 Joyful Share Good Harvest (feat. My Astro)

==== Crystal Ong ====
- 1994. 茶葉青 Green Tea Leaves
- 1995. 魚兒那裡來 Where Do Fish Come From?
- 1995. 大家來環保 Come On, Let's Be Environmentally Friendly
- 1995. 雙星報喜 Vol.1 Double Stars Bring Luck Vol.1 (feat. Queenzy Cheng)
- 1995. 雅歌群星龍獅會 Ya-Ko Stars Lion Dance (feat. Queenzy Cheng and other Ya-Ko artists)
- 1996. 雙星報喜 Vol.2 Double Stars Bring Luck Vol.2 (feat. Queenzy Cheng)
- 1996. 雅歌群星賀新年 Ya-Ko Stars Celebrate the New Year (feat. Queenzy Cheng)
- 1996. 花花絮絮 Highlights (feat. Queenzy Cheng)
- 1996. 飛越西洋 Flying Towards the West Ocean (feat. Huang Ke Qiu)
- 1996. 彩色精靈 Colorful Wizard (Volume 1 and 2)
- 1997. 雙星再報喜 Double Stars Bring Luck Again (feat. Cassandra Chin)
- 1997. 美少女戰士 Sailor Moon
- 1998. 雙星報雙喜 Double Stars Bring Double Luck (feat. Cassandra Chin)
- 1999. 天皇童星攜手賀新年 King Child Stars Together Wishing a Happy New Year (feat. Angeline Khoo)
- 1999. 兔氣揚眉慶豐年 Rabbits Celebrate the Harvest Year (feat. Queenzy Cheng and Cassandra Chin)
- 1999. 青蘋果 Green Apple (Volume 1 and 2)
- 1999. 山歌黃梅調 Huang Mei Diao Mountain Songs (feat. Queenzy Cheng and Cassandra Chin)
- 2000. 三星拱照慶龍年 Three Stars Celebrate the Year of the Dragon (feat. Queenzy Cheng and Cassandra Chin)
- 2000. 粉紅世界 Pink World (Crystal Solo Album)
- 2000. 福建經典名曲對對唱 Fujian Classics Duets (feat. Angeline Khoo)
- 2000. 民謠 Folk Songs 2 in 1 (feat. Queenzy Cheng and Cassandra Chin)
- 2011. 舞動春天 Dancing Spring (feat. San Da Huang Pai)
- 2011. 天天好天好福氣 Everyday is a Great Day with Good Fortune (feat. My Astro)
- 2012. 四海歡騰 Whole World Celebration (feat. San Da Huang Pai)
- 2016. 新年團圓 New Year Reunion (feat. Nick and Stella Chung)
- 2017. Renée
- 2019. 招财进宝 Lucky Fortune (Digital Single) (With Queenzy Cheng)
- 2019. 恭喜发财利是来 Congratulations on Making Money (feat. Angeline Khoo)
- 2020. 天子盛世 Prosperous Dynasty (feat. Nick and Stella Chung)
- 2020. 金鼓凤鸣迎新岁 Golden Drum Fengming Welcome the New Year
- 2021. 美不胜收 So Beautiful
- 2022. Ong Ong (feat. Nick and Stella Chung)
- 2022. Ü虎加把劲 Ü Tiger Work Harder (feat. My Astro)
- 2022. 五谷丰登 Five Fields
- 2023. 一跃前进 旺兔 GOLD Leap Forward Prosperous GOLD Rabbit (feat. My Astro)
- 2023. 祝福你 Bless You (Digital Single)
- 2024. 开心龙龙 Way Happy Dragons 2024 (feat. My Astro)
- 2024. 从东京走到纽约 Walk from Tokyo to New York (Digital Single) (feat. Lin Xin Tian)
- 2024. 有你一起 I Got You With You Together I Got You (Digital Single)
- 2025. 疯狂新年 Crazy New Year
- 2025. 喜乐乐 SHARE 丰年 Joyful Share Good Harvest (feat. My Astro)
- 2026. 哈哈新年好
