= Firdhaus Farmizi =

Malaysian singer-songwriter (born 1998)

Firdhaus
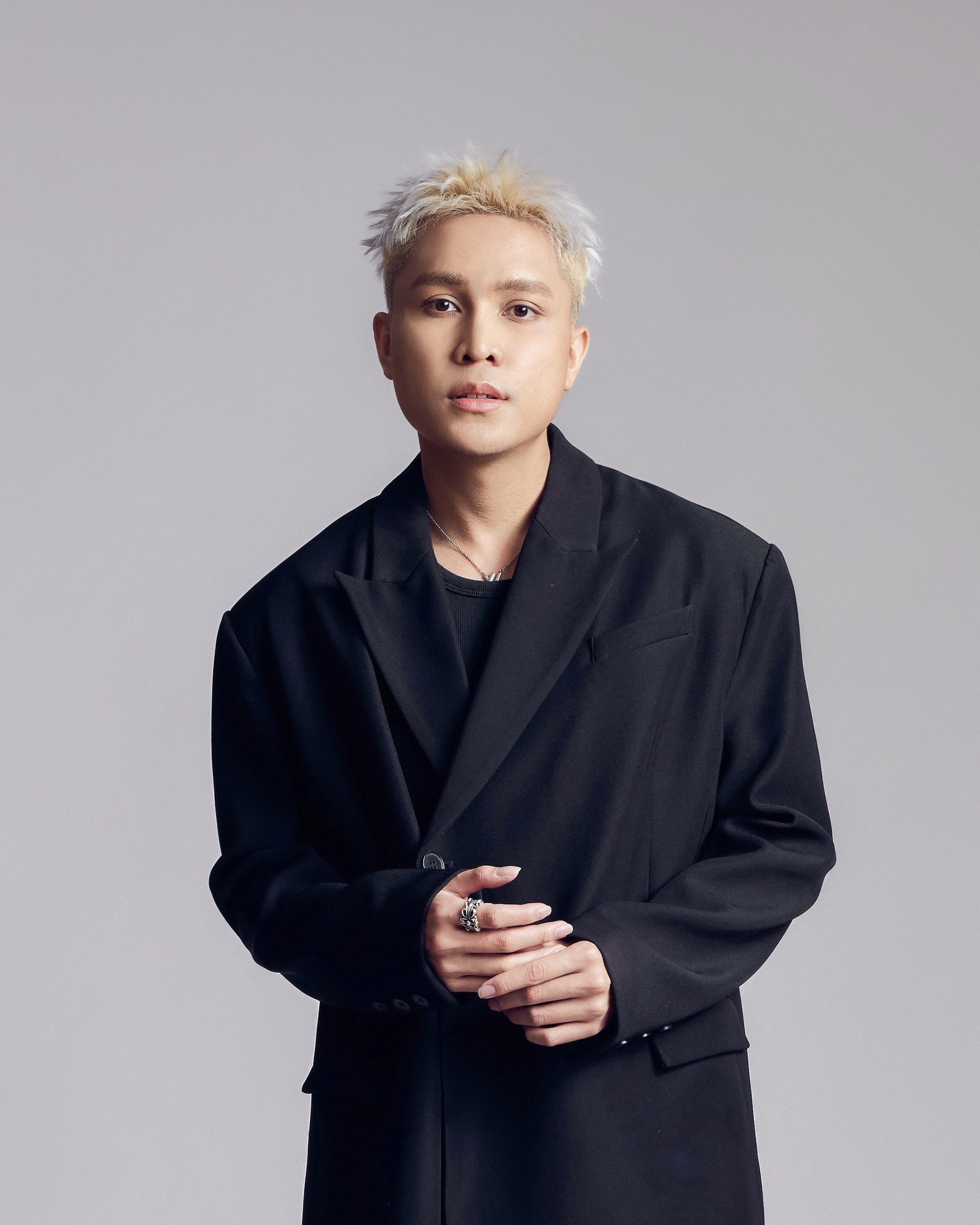
- Firdhaus in 2025
- Born: Muhammad Firdhaus bin Farmizi; 21 November 1998 (age 27); Kulai, Johor, Malaysia
- Occupation: Singer-songwriter
- Years active: 2020–present
- Musical career
- Origin: Kuala Lumpur, Malaysia
- Genres: Mandopop; R&B; rock
- Instrument: Vocals
- Label: Loolala Music
- Website: loolalamusic.com
- Website: fffirdhaus.com

Muhammad Firdhaus bin Farmizi (Chinese: 菲道尔; pinyin: Fēidàoěr; born 21 November 1998), known professionally as Firdhaus, is a Malaysian singer-songwriter. He debuted in the Mandopop industry under Loolala Music in 2020. His debut studio album, Up & Down, was released in October 2022.

== Biography ==
=== Early life ===
Firdhaus was born in Kulai, Johor, Malaysia. He became fluent in Mandarin Chinese as a consequence of attending a Chinese independent school from kindergarten to the secondary level. Firdhaus noted that having numerous Chinese acquaintances also aided in his language acquisition, yet he can still communicate in his native tongue. He said he would always be Malay and that he spoke his native tongue fluently, as well as singing in Malay. His environment and social media followers are primarily Chinese, therefore, he concentrates on singing in Mandarin so they can comprehend what he is trying to say.

=== Career ===
Firdhaus gained an interest in music after listening to Eric Chou, a Mandopop singer. He is signed with Loolala Music. His ballad "Gulf of Alaska" went viral in 2020, receiving over 700 thousand views on Douyin. Berita Harian states that he is the first Malay singer to accomplish such a feat. When the movement control order (MCO) was put in place in March 2020 as a result of the COVID-19 epidemic, he became increasingly active on social media. He shares covers of various Mandarin, English, and Korean songs on his Instagram page, in addition to his own original music.

== Discography ==
=== Studio albums ===
List of studio albums
Title	Album details
Up & Down (人生 起起落落落落)	Released: 21 October 2022; Label: Loolala Music; Formats: CD, digital download, streaming

List of studio albums
Title	Album details
619 (六一九)	Released: 16 September 2025; Label: Loolala Music; Formats: CD, digital download, streaming

=== Extended plays ===
List of extended plays
Title	Album details
A Letter	Released: 20 November 2020; Label: Loolala Music; Formats: Digital download, streaming

=== Singles ===
List of singles, with selected chart positions
Title	Year	Peak chart positions					Album
Title	Year	MLY	MLY Chin.	SGP	SGP Reg.	TWN	Album
"The Light of Hope" (疫外之光)	2020	—	—	—	—	—	Non-album single
"My Type" (My菜)	2020	—	—	—	—	—	In & Out
"Gulf of Alaska" (阿拉斯加海湾)	2020	—	9	—	—	—	A Letter
"If I Die Pls Tell My Mom I Love Her"	2020	—	—	—	—	—	Non-album singles
"Aku Gila Kamu" (MFMF. Remix)	2021	—	—	—	—	—	Non-album singles
"Sakura For You" (樱为你) (feat. Britney)	2021	—	—	—	—	—	Non-album singles
"See You" (早点回家)	2022	—	—	—	—	—	Up & Down
"Stay Safe" (乖乖好不好)	2022	—	—	—	—	—	Up & Down
"LDR" (异地恋)	2022	—	—	—	—	—	Up & Down
"Up & Down" (人生，起起落落落落落?)	2022	—	6	—	—	—	Up & Down
"Table For Two"	2022	—	—	—	—	—	Up & Down
"WMXGHZYSQN" (我没想过会这样失去你)	2023	—	5	—	—	—	Non-album singles
"Divorce in Ghana" (在加纳共和国离婚) (with DIOR)	2023	14	1	13	4	1	Non-album singles
"Kyoto."	2023	—	—	—	—	—	Non-album singles
"We're Only Human" (我们都是第一次做人)	2023	—	—	—	—	—	Non-album singles
"Eternal Friend with Friendship " (友谊长存)	2024	7	1	— (Note: "Eternal Friendship" did not chart on the RIAS Top Streaming Chart, but it peaked at number 12 on the component Top Regional Chart.)	12	16	Non-album singles
"Neng Yujian, Jiu Hen Bucuo Le" (能遇见, 就很不錯了)	2024	25	1	—	14	14	Non-album singles
"Bu Xihuan Jiu Qing Zhi Shuo" (不喜欢就请直说) (featuring No Time for Silence)	2024	—	—	—	—	—	Non-album singles
"—" denotes the release did not chart.

== Concert tours ==
- We're Only Human《我们都是第一次做人》 (2023-2024)
  - Malaysia, Zepp Kuala Lumpur (22 December 2023)
  - Singapore, Esplanade Theatre (13 and 14 June 2024)
- "Hello Again" Asia Tour (《能遇见，就很不错了》亚洲巡回演唱会)（2024-2025）
  - China, Guangzhou Livehouse (4 August 2024)
  - Malaysia, Arena Of Stars (31 August and 1 September 2024)
