= MeleTOP =

Malaysian television programme

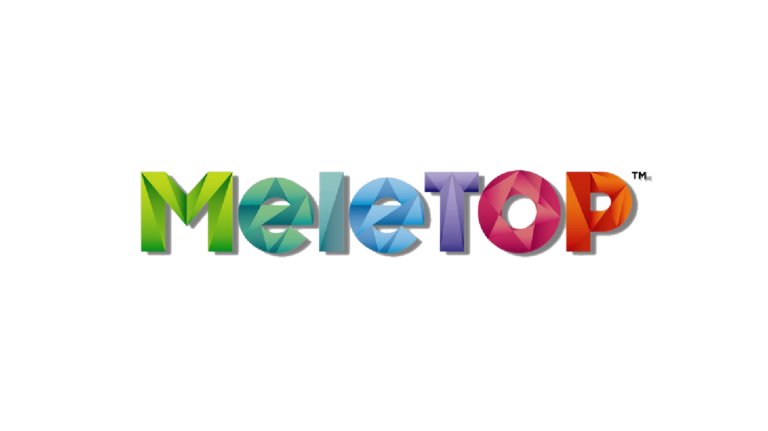
- Original MeleTOP Logo From (2012–Present)
- Genre: Talk show; Variety show
- Created by: Astro; Aznil Nawawi
- Directed by: Adlan Shaharir (2012–2014)
- Presented by: Neelofa (formerly); Nabil Ahmad; Namie
- Country of origin: Malaysia
- Original language: Malay
- No. of seasons: 15
- No. of episodes: 693 (list of episodes)

Production
- Camera setup: Multi-camera
- Running time: 60 minutes
- Production company: ASTRO

Original release
- Network: Astro Ria
- Release: October 30, 2012 – present

MeleTOP (or MeleTop; also stylized as Mele10P for its 10th anniversary) is a Malaysian television infotainment talk show and variety show aired weekly on Astro Ria. From its debut in 2012, it was hosted by the same two presenters, female host Neelofa, and male host Nabil Ahmad, until Neelofa left in 2019. It has held the annual Anugerah MeleTOP ERA (MeleTOP ERA Awards) jointly with Malaysian radio station, ERA since 2013.

== Program history ==
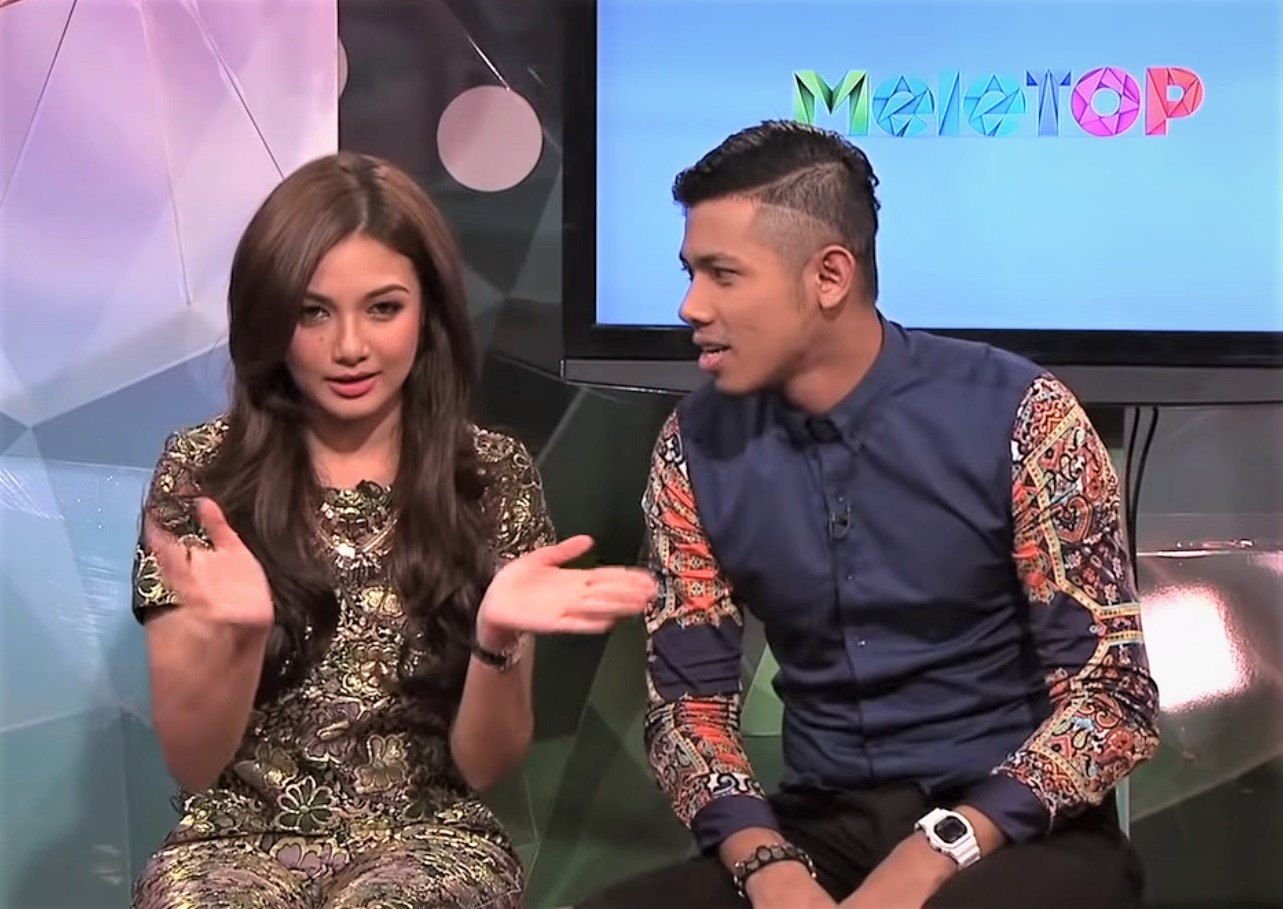
Neelofa and Nabil on MeleTOP episode 100 in 2014

MeleTOP (sometimes stylised MeleTop) is a Malaysian television infotainment talk show and variety show, aired every Tuesday on Astro Ria. The name of the show is a play on the Malay word "meletup", meaning "explosive". MeleTOP first aired in 2012, with host Neelofa and Nabil Ahmad as hosts. The program usually includes banter between the co-hosts, a comedic parody ("Parodi") segment, and celebrity guests from the Malay-speaking entertainment industry promoting their work. The program is broadcast live, and was performed before a studio audience until March 2020, when it was recorded in an empty studio due to the COVID-19 pandemic.

In 2016, MeleTOP apologized for airing a video with an actor in blackface. The video was intended to parody Malaysian singer Yuna and African-American singer Usher performing the song "Crush", in Philadelphia, which had drawn criticism in Malaysia for the pair hugging on stage.

Neelofa left the show in December 2019, with an announcement during the programme, surprising the audience and her co-host. Since then her role has been filled by a series of rotating celebrity guest hosts, including Erra Fazira, Shweta Sekhon, Nora Danish, Elly Mazlein and Sherry Alhadad.

In 2022, the series celebrates 10th anniversary, and at the same time, former TV3 personality, Hawa Rizwana became the new co-host of the series, replacing Neelofa who left in 2019.

== Hosts ==
Main Host	Host Not Following Season

- Latest Host MeleTOP

Season
Season 1	Season 2	Season 3	Season 4	Season 5	Season 6	Season 7	Season 8	Season 9	Season 10	Season 11	Season 12	Season 13	Season 14	Season 15
Year
(2012)	(2013)	(2014)	(2015)	(2016)	(2017)	(2018)	(2019)	(2020)	(2021)	(2022)	(2023)	(2024)	(2025)	(2026)
(Main Host MeleTOP)
Nabil Ahmad (2012–Present)
Yes	Yes	Yes	Yes	Yes	Yes	Yes	Yes	Yes	Yes	Yes	Yes	Yes	Yes	Yes
Neelofa (2012–2019)
Yes	Yes	Yes	Yes	Yes	Yes	Yes	Yes	No	No	No	No	No	No	No
Hawa Rizwana (2022–Present)
No	No	No	No	No	No	No	No	No	No	Yes	Yes	Yes	Yes	Yes
Namie Smy (2023–Present)
No	No	No	No	No	No	No	No	No	No	No	Yes	Yes	Yes	Yes

=== Guest Host MeleTOP ===
- Adibah Noor
- Lisa Surihani
- Nad Zainal
- Dato' AC Mizal
- Haniff Hamzah
- Hanis Zalikha
- Yana Samsudin
- Datuk Aznil Hj Nawawi
- Achey Bocey
- Jihan Muse
- Zizan Razak
- Sharifah Sakinah
- Abam Bocey
- Sharnaaz Ahmad
- Shahrol Shiro
- Mira Filzah
- Fad Bocey
- Imam Muda Asyraf
- Siti Nordiana
- Scha Al-Yahya
- Siti Elizad
- Nabila Huda
- Mat Dan
- Awal Ashaari
- Dzawin Nur
- Awie
- Erra Fazira
- Sherry Alhadad
- Kamal Adli
- Nabila Razali
- Jaa Suzuran
- Nora Danish
- Elfira Loy
- Tya Arifin
- Remy Ishak
- Farah Nabilah
- Sangeeta Krishnasamy
- Hani Fadzil
- Ain Edruce
- Khai Bahar
- Elfarabi Faeez
- Amelia Henderson
- Radin Amir Affendy
- Dato' Sri Siti Nurhaliza
- Elly Mazlein
- Raja Azura
- Shweta Sekhon
- Uyaina Arshad
- Zulin Aziz
- Wany Hasrita
- Mimi Lana
- Ramona Zamzam
- Wawa Zainal
- Michael Ang
- Cik Manggis
- Zara Zya
- Zizi Kirana
- Cik B
- Daiyan Trisha
- Zahirah MacWilson
- Ummi Nazeera
- Heliza Helmi
- Fakhrul Radhi
- Hetty Koes Endang
- Phoon Chi Ho
- Tracie Sinidol
- Kashika Selvam
- Keanu Azman
- Bell Ngasri
- Namie Smy (Regular Guest Host)
- Sean Lee
- Sharif Zero
- Diana Danielle
- Neelofa
- Hady Mirza
- PU Amin
- Revath (Saravedi Special Merdeka)
- Dr. Ram (Saravedi Special Merdeka)
- Joey (Curry Fishball Special Merdeka)
- Haziq Hussni
- Mierul Aiman
- Ceddy Ang
- Amira Othman
- Ustaz Fareez Izmir
- Cheryl Toh (MeleTOP TVS)
- Fattah Bolh (MeleTOP TVS)
- Ghaz Zawawi (MeleTOP TVS)
- Shashic Iewan

== Episodes ==
=== Season 1 (2012) ===
List of MeleTOP episodes (2012)

No. Episodes	Broadcast Date/Day	Hosts	Guest Stars	Musical Guests
1	30 October 2012; (Tuesday)	Nabil Ahmad; Neelofa	Farid Kamil; Black Hanifah	—
Segment 1: Nabil & Neelofa interviewed with; Farid Kamil; Black Hanifah.; Segment 2: Nabil & Neelofa interviewed Farid Kamil, he telling about the latest updates and promotes his film namely, Lagenda Budak Setan 2: Katerina, which published by (Astro Shaw). This film will begin cinemas across Malaysia starting on (29 November 2012). Additionally, he also telling the story of the character he portrays and the film's synopsis.; Segment 3: Nabil & Neelofa interviewed Black Hanifah he telling about her latest updates and promotes his latest single, "Teman Pengganti". Black Hanifah he telling the story behind the song and performed in the MeleTOP studio.
2	6 November 2012; (Tuesday)	Nabil Ahmad; Neelofa	Najwa Latif; Kumpulan Klangit; Aznil Nawawi; Alyah	—
Segment 1: Nabil & Neelofa interviewed with; Najwa Latif; Kumpulan Klangit; Aznil Nawawi; Alyah.; Segment 2: Nabil & Neelofa conducted an exclusive phone call interview with Najwa Latif to tells the story of her preparations for the Sijil Pelajaran Malaysia (SPM2012) examination.; Segment 3: Nabil & Neelofa conducted an exclusive phone call interview with the group Klangit to address rumors that they were acting arrogantly. The allegations stemmed from their refusal to perform two songs as promised to the organizers, citing the reason that the stage was not attractive enough.; Segment 4: Nabil & Neelofa conducted an exclusive phone call interview with Aznil Nawawi. They also wished Aznil a happy 50th birthday.; Segment 5: Nabil & Neelofa interviewed Alyah he telling about her latest updates and promotes his latest single, "Kau Yang Terindah". Alyah he telling the story behind the song and performed in the MeleTOP studio.
3	13 November 2012; (Tuesday)	Nabil Ahmad; Adibah Noor	Neelofa; Hanez Suraya; Zahiril Adzim; Hazama	—
Segment 1: Nabil & Adibah Noor interviewed with Neelofa; Hanez Suraya; Zahiril Adzim; Hazama; Segment 2: Nabil & Adibah conducted an exclusive phone call interview with Neelofa.; Segment 3: Adibah Noor promoted the 19th Music Industry Awards and he telling about spoke about her preparations as the host for the awards night.; Segment 4: Nabil & Adibah conducted an exclusive phone call interview with Hanez Suraya. She to address rumors that which states that the gossip about surrounding the issue involving Amy Search's wife—specifically the claim that she couldn't be bothered to care about the matter. Hanez stated that she did not understand the problem Amy Search's wife had with her, noting that while she had met the woman in person, the latter had been unwilling to engage. The interview also touched upon rumors of a renewed feud between Hanez Suraya and Amy Search.; Segment 5: Nabil & Adibah conducted an exclusive phone call interview with Zahiril Adzim. Nabil and Adibah congratulated Zahiril Adzim following the news that his wife, Shera Ayob, is five weeks pregnant.; Segment 6: Nabil & Adibah interviewed Hazama, he telling about his latest updates—including his nominations for the Music Industry Awards (19thAIM), specifically in the Best Vocal Performance in a Song (Male) category—and promoted his latest single, "Majnun". Hazama he telling about the story behind the song and performed in the MeleTOP studio.
4	20 November 2012; (Tuesday)	Nabil Ahmad; Neelofa	Shuk Sahar; Leuniey Natasha; Dato' AC Mizal	—
Segment 1: Nabil & Neelofa interviewed with Shuk Sahar; Leuniey Natasha; Dato' AC Mizal.; Segment 2: Nabil & Neelofa conducted an exclusive phone call interview with Shuk Sahar, he telling about address rumors that which states that the gossip about Did the group Balas disappoint the audience with a crude comedy performance He had previously performed on the Maharaja Lawak Mega (2012) stage.; Segment 3: Nabil & Neelofa conducted an exclusive phone call interview with Leuniey Natasha to address rumors that she and Khairul Fahmi Che Mat are set to married this Disember, and the couple he telling about their wedding preparations.; Segment 4: Nabil & Neelofa interviewed Dato' AC Mizal, he telling about the latest updates and promoted the Astro reality television show namely Maharaja Lawak Mega (2012).
5	27 November 2012; (Tuesday)	Nabil Ahmad; Neelofa	Kumpulan Ungu	—
Segment 1: Nabil & Neelofa interviewed with; Kumpulan Ungu.; Segment 2: Nabil & Neelofa interviewed The band Ungu, he telling about the latest updates the band Ungu to promote their latest album, "Timeless", and the band he telling about the stories behind the song; they also performed at the Anugerah Carta Borneo Era (2012) performed in the MeleTOP studio studio his latest single, "Percaya Padaku".
6	4 December 2012; (Tuesday)	Nabil Ahmad; Neelofa	Lisa Surihani; Rafidah Ibrahim; Afdlin Shauki; Ella Aminuddin; Azhar Husaini Ghazali	Edrie Hashim
Segment 1: Nabil & Neelofa interviewed with; Lisa Surihani; Rafidah Ibrahim; Afdlin Shauki; Ella Aminuddin; Azhar Husaini Ghazali.; Segment 2: Nabil & Neelofa interviewed Lisa Surihani, he telling about the latest updates and promoting his, which his film namely Instabul Aku Datang!, which published by (Grand Brilliance) & (Redfilms). This film has already been screened cinemas across Malaysia starting on (8 November 2012). Additionally, he also telling the story of the character he portrays and the film's synopsis.; Segment 3: Nabil & Neelofa conducted an exclusive phone call interview with Rafidah Ibrahim. Rafidah addressed rumors that she had been attacked by Zalif Sidek's girlfriend. She explained that their budding romance had faced numerous obstacles; a woman had tried to interfere in the relationship and threatened her with abusive language over the phone, demanding she stay away from Zalif. Consequently, Rafidah was left traumatized by the incident and now maintains that she and Zalif are merely friends.; Segment 4: Nabil & Neelofa conducted an exclusive phone call via interview with Afdlin Shauki to get the latest updates on the humanitarian mission to Gaza via Egypt. During the interview, they asked about the journey and the mission's progress, as well as the conditions encountered while there. Afdlin also he telling about information on the current status of the humanitarian mission and his experiences while participating in it.; Segment 5: Nabil & Neelofa interviewed Ella Aminuddin and Azhar Husaini Ghazali he telling about her latest updates and promotes his latest single, "Patience". Ella & Azhar he telling the story behind the song and performed in the MeleTOP studio.
7	11 December 2012; (Tuesday)	Nabil Ahmad; Neelofa	Nadiya Nisaa; Hanez Suraya; Johan As'ari; Awie	—
Segment 1: Nabil & Neelofa interviewed with; Nadiya Nisaa; Hanez Suraya; Johan As'ari; Awie.; Segment 2: Nabil & Neelofa interviewed Nadiya Nisaa, he telling about the latest updates and promoting the drama series Adam & Hawa, which is broadcast on the channel (Astro Mustika HD) channel. This drama has already premiered on (27 Ogos 2012). Additionally, he also telling the story of the character he portrays and the drama's synopsis.; Segment 3: Nabil & Neelofa interviewed Hanez Suraya, he telling about the latest updates and promoting the drama series Dalam Hati Ada Taman, which is broadcast on the channel (Astro Ria) channel. This drama has already premiered on (29 Oktober 2012). Additionally, he also telling the story of the character he portrays and the drama's synopsis.; Segment 4: Nabil & Neelofa conducted an exclusive phone call interview with Johan As'ari. He to address rumors that she he telling about the gossip surrounding his relationship with Nabila Huda; while there was talk that his career had stagnated because of the romance, Johan insisted that Nabila was not the cause of the slump.; Segment 5: Nabil & Neelofa conducted an exclusive phone call interview with Awie, during which he addressed rumors—specifically denying allegations—that he telling about had been involved in a fistfight in Langkawi. Awie questioned when such a fight supposedly took place, noting that he hadn't even set foot in Langkawi for a long time due to his busy schedule.
8	18 December 2012; (Tuesday)	Nabil Ahmad; Neelofa	Hafiz Suip; Hatta Dolmat; Datin Zaiton Mohd Jiwa; Najwa Latif	—
Segment 1: Nabil & Neelofa interviewed with; Hafiz Suip; Hatta Dolmat; Datin Zaiton Mohd Jiwa; Najwa Latif.; Segment 2: Nabil & Neelofa interviewed Hafiz Suip, he telling about the latest updates and Hafiz recently won awards at the Anugerah Planet Muzik (2012) Among the categories he won was Best Male Artist (11th APM) and he telling spoke about his victories.; Segment 3: Nabil & Neelofa conducted an exclusive phone call interview with Hatta Dolmat. Hatta addressed rumors that two renowned fashion designers were dissatisfied with Alyah regarding her outfits; specifically, Rizman Ruzaini and Hatta Dolmat were reportedly frustrated after she failed to wear the sponsored garments at the Anugerah Planet Muzik awards ceremony.; Segment 4: Nabil & Neelofa conducted an exclusive phone call interview with Datin Zaiton Mohd Jiwa. They inquired about the condition of Dato' Khalid Mohamad Jiwa, who had been involved in a road accident in New Zealand; he has been suffered a fractured shoulder and underwent surgery.; Segment 5: Nabil & Neelofa interviewed Najwa Latif he telling about her latest updates and promotes his latest single, "Sahabat". Najwa he telling the story behind the song and performed in the MeleTOP studio.
9	25 December 2012; (Tuesday)	Nabil Ahmad; Neelofa	Mejar Dr. Faiz Khaleed; Ezlynn	—
Segment 1: Nabil & Neelofa interviewed with; Mejar Dr. Faiz Khaleed; Ezlynn; Segment 2: Nabil & Neelofa interviewed Faiz Khaleed and Ezlynn he telling about her latest updates Faiz and Ezlynn Them too promoted the Astro reality television show namely Fear Factor Malaysia: Celebrity (season 1), he telling about the program and their experiences as contestants. Faiz was eliminated in the Episode 4, while Ezlynn was eliminated in the Episode 6.

=== Season 2 (2013) ===
List of MeleTOP episodes (2013)

No. Episodes	Broadcast Date/Day	Hosts	Guest Stars	Musical Guests
10	1 January 2013; (Tuesday)	Nabil Ahmad; Neelofa	Ezani MasterChef Malaysia (2); Adira Suhaimi; Aweera	—
Segment 1: Nabil & Neelofa interviewed with; Ezani MasterChef Malaysia (2); Adira Suhaimi; Aweera.; Segment 2: Nabil & Neelofa interviewed Ezani, he telling about the latest updates and Ezani was recently crowned the winner of the Astro reality cooking show namely MasterChef Malaysia (season 1). She telling about the show and her experience as a participant emerging as the season's champion.; Segment 3: Nabil & Neelofa interviewed Adira Suhaimi and Aweera, they telling about the latest updates and Adira promoted the soundtrack (OST) for the film Ombak Rindu as well as her latest single, also titled "Ombak Rindu", and he telling the story behind the song . Meanwhile, Aweera promoted his latest single, "Andai Ku Bercinta Lagi", and he telling the about behind that song. They also performed in the a medley of the song in the MeleTOP studio.
11	8 January 2013; (Tuesday)	Nabil Ahmad; Neelofa	Aaron Aziz; Kumpulan Sleeq	—
Segment 1: Nabil & Neelofa interviewed with; Aaron Aziz; Kumpulan Sleeq.; Segment 2: Nabil & Neelofa interviewed Aaron Aziz, he telling about the latest updates and promoting the drama series Adam & Hawa, which is broadcast on the channel (Astro Mustika HD). This drama has already premiered on (27 Ogos 2012). Additionally, he also telling the story of the character he portrays and the drama's synopsis.; Segment 3: Nabil & Neelofa interviewed Aaron Aziz and Kumpulan Sleeq they telling about his latest updates and promotes his latest single, "Salam Semua". Aaron Aziz and Kumpulan Sleeq he telling the story behind the song and performed in the MeleTOP studio
12	15 January 2013; (Tuesday)	Nabil Ahmad; Neelofa	Shahz Jaszle; Liyana Jasmay	—
Segment 1: Nabil & Neelofa interviewed with; Shahz Jaszle; Liyana Jasmay.; Segment 2: Nabil & Neelofa interviewed Shahz Jaszle, he telling about the latest updates and promoting the drama series Sehangat Asmara, which is broadcast on the channel (Astro Mustika HD). This drama series will begin airing (21 Januari 2013). Additionally, he also telling the story of the character he portrays and the drama's synopsis.; Segment 3:
13	22 January 2013; (Tuesday)	Nabil Ahmad; Neelofa	Kumpulan Shiro; Tauke Jambu; Najwa Mahiaddin	—
14	29 January 2013; (Tuesday)	Nabil Ahmad; Neelofa	Anuar Zain; Shae	—
15	5 February 2013; (Tuesday)	Nabil Ahmad; Neelofa	Rashidi Ishak; Usop Wilcha	—
16	12 February 2013; (Tuesday)	Nabil Ahmad; Neelofa	Fahrin Ahmad; Ainan Tasneem	—
17	19 February 2013; (Tuesday)	Nabil Ahmad; Neelofa	Dato' Fazley Yaakob; Dato' Siti Nurhaliza	—
18	26 February 2013; (Tuesday)	Nabil Ahmad; Neelofa	Alif Hadi; Gambit Saifullah; Pekin Ibrahim; Zahiril Adzim	—
19	5 March 2013; (Tuesday)	Nabil Ahmad; Neelofa	Arja Lee; Alam Wakaka; Faizal Hussein; Hans Isaac; Harith Iskander	—
20	12 March 2013; (Tuesday)	Nabil Ahmad; Neelofa	Dafi; Zoey Rahman; Scha Alyahya; Yusry KRU	—
21	19 March 2013; (Tuesday)	Nabil Ahmad; Neelofa	Elfira Loy; Ajak Shiro; Rita Rudaini; Nur Fereena Ezlin; Misha Omar	—
22	26 March 2013; (Tuesday)	Nabil Ahmad; Neelofa	Akhmal Nazri; Aedy Ashraf; Kumpulan Estranged	—
23	2 April 2013; (Tuesday)	Nabil Ahmad; Neelofa	Dazrin Kamarudin; Hairul Azreen; Yasmin Hani; Afgan	—
24	9 April 2013; (Tuesday)	Nabil Ahmad; Neelofa	Eravengers; Adi Putra; Sein Ruffedge	—
25	16 April 2013; (Tuesday)	Nabil Ahmad; Neelofa	Afiq Muiz; Rozita Che Wan; Kumpulan Wings	—
26	23 April 2013; (Tuesday)	Nabil Ahmad; Neelofa	Lydiawati; Yassin Yahya; Kumpulan Pretty Ugly	—
27	30 April 2013; (Tuesday)	Nabil Ahmad; Neelofa	Chef Mohd Johari Edrus; Chef Adu Amran Hassan; Chef Zubir Md. Zain; Zain Saidin; Keroz Nazri; Dira Abu Zahar; Judika	—
28	7 May 2013; (Tuesday)	Nabil Ahmad; Neelofa	Sathiya; Ammar Alfian; Mizz Nina; Ziana Zain; Dayang Nurfaizah	—
29	14 May 2013; (Tuesday)	Nabil Ahmad; Neelofa	Sherry Ibrahim; Awie; Harun Salim Bachik; Shuib Sepahtu	—
30	21 May 2013; (Tuesday)	Nabil Ahmad; Neelofa	Sasi The Don; Norish Karman; Awal Ashaari; Dato' Jamal Abdillah	—
31	28 May 2013; (Tuesday)	Nabil Ahmad; Neelofa	Radhi OAG; Harris Alif; Azrul Zaidi; Fouziah Gous; Adira Suhaimi	—
32	4 June 2013; (Tuesday)	Nabil Ahmad; Neelofa	Izzue Islam; Kumpulan Hujan; Kumpulan Love Me Butch; Ahmad Idham; Maya Karin	—
33	11 June 2013; (Tuesday)	Nabil Ahmad; Neelofa	Dato' AC Mizal; Hanis Zalikha; David Teo; W.A.R.I.S	—
34	18 June 2013; (Tuesday)	Nabil Ahmad; Neelofa	Atilia Haron; Yasmin Hani; Dynas Mokhtar; Stacy; Syamsul Yusof; Nashrudin Elias	—
35	25 June 2013; (Tuesday)	Nabil Ahmad; Neelofa	Hanez Suraya; Baim Wong; Elfira Loy; Pierre Andre; Kumpulan Bunkface	—
36	5 July 2013; (Tuesday)	Nabil Ahmad; Neelofa	Hazama; Syura Badron; Yana Samsudin; Shila Amzah	—
37	9 July 2013; (Tuesday)	Nabil Ahmad; Neelofa	Azrul Zaidi; Jihan Muse; Sherry Ibrahim; Tomok	—
38	16 July 2013; (Tuesday)	Nabil Ahmad; Neelofa	Fizo Omar; Diana Amir; Hafiz Hamidun	—
39	23 July 2013; (Tuesday)	Nabil Ahmad; Neelofa	Shaheizy Sam; Along Cham; Kumpulan Hyper Act	—
40	30 July 2013; (Tuesday)	Nabil Ahmad; Neelofa	Hans Isaac; Natassia Malthe; Vicha Saywho	—
41	6 August 2013; (Tuesday)	Nabil Ahmad; Neelofa	Hafiz Suip; Yana Samsudin; W.A.R.I.S; Tauke Jambu	Rody; Acap; Afiez; Khecik; Arul
MeleTOP Raya Special (Part 1).
42	10 August 2013; (Saturday)	Nabil Ahmad; Neelofa	Nazirah Ayub; Mikayla; Intan Ladyana; Kumpulan Shiro; Shac Era; Azrul Zaidi; Jihan Muse; Shasha Alkhred	Rody; Acap; Afiez; Khecik; Arul
MeleTOP Raya Special (Part 2).
43	20 August 2013; (Tuesday)	Nabil Ahmad; Neelofa	Syazwan Zulkifly; Didie Alias; Lisa Surihani; Serina Redzuawan	—
44	27 August 2013; (Tuesday)	Nabil Ahmad; Neelofa	Adi Fashla; Almy Nadia; Afdlin Shauki; Rahim Sepahtu; Harun Salim Bachik; Firman Siagian	—
45	3 September 2013; (Tuesday)	Nabil Ahmad; Neelofa	Kumpulan Kotak; Faizal Tahir; Sofi Jikan; Adam Corrie; Datuk Yusof Haslam; Datuk Rosyam Nor	—
46	10 September 2013; (Tuesday)	Nabil Ahmad; Neelofa	Nabila Huda; Liyana Jasmay; Kumpulan Mojo	—
47	17 September 2013; (Tuesday)	Nabil Ahmad; Neelofa	Nad Zainal; Izzue Islam; Terryana Fatiah	—
48	24 September 2013; (Tuesday)	Nabil Ahmad; Lisa Surihani	Kilafairy; Intan Ladyana; Tegar Septian	—
49	1 October 2013; (Tuesday)	Nabil Ahmad; Neelofa	Rozita Che Wan; Farid Kamil; Nora Danish; Zizan Razak; Kaka Azraff	—
50	8 October 2013; (Tuesday)	Nabil Ahmad; Neelofa	Fizz Fairuz; Melly Goeslaw; Altimet; Awi Rafael	—
51	15 October 2013; (Tuesday)	Nabil Ahmad; Neelofa	Aeril Zafrel; Tasha Shilla; Shahir Zawawi; Hafiz Suip	—
52	22 October 2013; (Tuesday)	Nabil Ahmad; Neelofa	Shukri Yahaya; Syarif Sleeq; Dato' AC Mizal; Mawi	—
53	29 October 2013; (Tuesday)	Nabil Ahmad; Neelofa	Rashidi Ishak; Dina Nadzir; Pria Band	—
54	5 November 2013; (Tuesday)	Nabil Ahmad; Neelofa	Ayai Illusi; Altimet; Johan Raja Lawak; Jep Sepahtu	—
55	12 November 2013; (Tuesday)	Nabil Ahmad; Neelofa	Mawar Abdul Karim; Fizo Omar; Dato' Siti Nurhaliza	—
56	19 November 2013; (Tuesday)	Nabil Ahmad; Neelofa	Faizul Sany; Kumpulan Azhael; Kumpulan Repvblik	—
57	26 November 2013; (Tuesday)	Nabil Ahmad; Neelofa	Fasha Sandha; Izzue Islam; Dato' Rossa	—
58	3 December 2013; (Tuesday)	Nabil Ahmad; Neelofa	Johan Raja Lawak; Raykarl Iskandar; Kumpulan Jambu; Akim Ahmad	—
59	10 December 2013; (Tuesday)	Nabil Ahmad; Neelofa	Sharnaaz Ahmad; Nelydia Senrose; Emma Maembong; Hazama	—
60	17 December 2013; (Tuesday)	Nabil Ahmad; Neelofa	Azwan Ali; Michael Ang; Shila Amzah	—
61	24 December 2013; (Tuesday)	Nabil Ahmad; Neelofa	Aril Pilus; Puteri Erma Edlinda; Joe Flizzow; Altimet; SonaOne	—
62	31 December 2013; (Tuesday)	Nabil Ahmad; Nad Zainal	Fizz Fairuz; Dato' Fazley Yaakob	—

== MeleTOP ERA Awards ==
MeleTOP and Astro Radio-owned Malay radio station ERA jointly hold the annual "Anugerah MeleTOP ERA" (MeleTOP ERA Awards), which awards prizes based on public voting in several categories in music, film, and television entertainment. The awards have been held annually since 2014, with the 2013 awards being held in February 2014.

In 2017, Neelofa, who was one of the hosts of the awards program, won the Top Top Meletop main award for a female celebrity. In 2018, while again hosting the program, she won four awards, for best fashion, television actress, television drama, and Top Top Meletop. Neelofa acknowledged that many Malaysians questioned her winning at the same time she hosted, but said that there was no impropriety since the awards were determined by fans, not by the show.
