= Elly Mazlein =

Malaysian media entertainer

- ايللي مذليين
- Born: Sharifah Aida Mazlina binti Syed Hanafi; 17 December 1980 (age 45); Slim River, Perak, Malaysia
- Other name: Kak Lina Pom Pom/Rokiah
- Education: Malaysian Certificate of Education (SPM)
- Occupations: Singer; Actress; TV Host; Comedian; Radio Presenter
- Years active: 1997–present
- Employer: Astro Audio (2022–2025)
- Height: 165 cm (65 in)
- Spouses: Azmi Mohd Hatta (m. 2014; div. 2015) Mohamad Azlan Che Nuh (m. 2020)
- Children: 1. Puteri Sara; Sefhia Azmi; (daughter); 2. Haider Mateen Mohamad Azlan (son)
- Parents: Syed Hanafi Syed Abdullah (father); Sabariah Ahmad (mother)
- Musical career
- Genres: Pop; Ballad
- Instrument: Vocal
- Labels: NAR Records; KRU Records; LIFE Records

Comedy career
- Medium: Television, film, and internet
- Genres: Stand-up comedian, drama, sketch comedy
- Subject: Comedy

YouTube information
- Genre: Vlog
- Subscribers: 221 thousand
- Views: 12.3 million
- Last updated: 10 March 2021

Sharifah Aida Mazlina binti Syed Hanafi or better known as Elly Mazlein (Jawi: ايلي مضلين, born 17 December 1980) is a Malaysian female singer, actress, host, comedian and radio presenter.

She signed a recording contract with NAR Records in 1997 and has released 4 solo studio albums over the 5 years of the contract. When she was a singer, she was often compared to her contemporaries' teenage singers such as Siti Nurhaliza and Liza Hanim. Even so, in 2001 she created her own record when her third album titled Elly managed to become one of the 10 best-selling Malaysian albums that year with sales exceeding 60,000 units. The success repeated the success of her previous album titled Satu Persatu which also sold 50,000 units. Elly managed to popularize songs such as "Usah Diduk Bara Yang Tersimpan", "Janji Kekasih" and "Bungaku Bakawali" which at that time dominated the country's radio charts. Her music career came to a halt in 2005 due to market factors and recording contracts.

As an actress, she began her acting career after being drafted by famous actor and director, Datuk Yusof Haslam to star in the drama series Gerak Khas and since then, she has made a name for herself as one of the best-selling female TV actresses in Malaysia.

== Early life ==
Elly Mazlein was born on 17 December 1980 in Kampung Behrang, Slim River, Perak to Syed Hanafi Syed Abdullah and Sabariah Ahmad. She graduated with a Sijil Pelajaran Malaysia (SPM).

== Career ==
=== Music ===
At the age of 17, Elly Mazlein signed a contract with NAR Records and recorded her debut album, Sutera Kasih with the song of the same title and "Biar Pilu Ada Penawarnya" were released as singles. This album was a commercial failure, but did not discourage Elly from being active in the music field. Her second album, Satu Persatu was released two years later. "Usah Diduk Bara Tersimpan" and "Janji Kekasih" were released as singles. The album became a commercial success when it sold 50,000 units.

Elly then collected new material for her third album, Elly which the recording process was carried out during the fasting month of 2000. Released on 26 March 2001, this album was touched by various composers and famous producers include Azmeer, Azman Abu Hassan and Eddie Hamid. Among the songs included in this album are "Bungaku Bakawali", "Cintaku Untuk Bahagia" and "Gerimis". Elly created its own record when it managed to become one of the 10 best-selling Malaysian albums with sales reaching 60,000 units. Satu Persatu and Elly also received Platinum certification from the Recording Industry Association of Malaysia (RIM).

Her first compilation album, Elly: The Best Ballads was released in 2002, bringing together a collection of the best songs from her three previous albums. It received a Gold certification. On 14 July 2002, Elly and the group Exists performed the charity concert Konsert Amal Afganistan – Exists 2002 which took place in Kuching, Sarawak.

In April 2003, Elly performed at the Sure Heboh Carnival (now Jom Heboh Carnival) in conjunction with TV3's 19th anniversary which took place at Dataran Sejarah, Ayer Keroh, Melaka. Apart from her, among the artists who participated were Ezlynn, Phyne Ballerz, Apacian, Chakra Sonic, Antz, Nora, Platinum, Sarah, Handy Black, Elyana, Siti Nordiana, Boboy, Ali (XPDC), Abot, Winnie Kok and Mamat.

Elly then made preparations to record her fourth album, Atas Nama Cinta. For this album, she carried out a careful song selection process. This album was released in September 2003 with the songs "Merry Go Round" and "Pendita Penipu" released as singles. Among the composers and producers who contributed to this album are Aidit Alfian, Azlan Abu Hassan, LY and Eddie Hamid.

After achieving success in the music industry for 7 years, Elly Mazlein's music career came to a halt due to market factors and recording contracts, and she took a long break from her singing career. Five years later, in 2010, Elly returned to music by releasing two new singles titled "Please Forgive Me" and "Kata Saja I Love You".

In March 2013, she released a single titled "Sabarlah Hati" which is a ballad genre under KRU Music, this song was created by Manusia Putih. She was quoted by the entertainment portal Sensasi Selebriti as saying: "Elly feels excited to be with KRU Music in promoting the latest single and always expects the best from KRU Music".

In October 2016, she became one of the contestants of the third season of Gegar Vaganza after receiving an offer from Astro to participate in the show. She announced her withdrawal after the fourth week's concert because she was said to be disappointed by the comments from the permanent judge, Ramli M.S..

On 26 April 2017, Elly released her latest single titled "Jeritan Hati" which is based on her life story. The single launch ceremony was held at Platinum Superstar Karaoke, Setapak Sentral, it was her first single in four years since "Sabarlah Hati".

She, together with Faizal Tahir and Zizi Kirana, re-recorded the classic song "Empat Dara" originally written by Atan Penambang and Ahmad Yusoh with the title "Empat Dara 2020". Since its official launch on YouTube in November 2020, the music video for this song has become the number two trending song on the Malaysian YouTube platform with the number of views reaching 4.5 million with over 9,400 comments from viewers who were generally entertained and gave very positive support. This song was also performed live at the 33rd Berita Harian Popular Star Awards.

On 26 February 2021, Elly appeared with The latest single, "Dusta Cinta" is a cover of Aina Abdul with lyrics written by Wan Zakaria. He said about this song: "I am sure that Aina (Abdul)'s talent and ability is quite great. So, it is not wrong for me to support and trust her. The work she sings herself is also great. I also hope that luck will be on my side. I see Aina as very creative. Aina is extraordinary and her touch is poisonous,".

=== Acting ===
Elly first tried her hand at acting in 1999 through the special telefilm Gerhana Di Mata Kabus Di Hati broadcast on RTM. However, Elly's acting career seriously began in 2002 when actor, director and producer Yusof Haslam invited her to star in the police drama series Gerak Khas playing the role of Detective Mazlein. It was her first drama to act in. However, she left the series three years later.

He was then offered to star in his first acting film, Janji Diana directed by Yusof and starring Rosyam Nor and Erra Fazira where he played the role of Etty. Released on 24 July 2003, the film became a commercial success when it managed to collect RM1.3 million.

In an interview with Utusan Malaysia on 6 July 2003, Elly said that she was honest about becoming an actress with the desire to try her luck in acting and improve her abilities in both fields that she was involved in. In the interview, she said: "At that time I didn't consider it something serious. I just wanted to try something new [...] Acting is now my second field after singing".

After Janji Diana, she was then offered the lead role in the film Tangkai Jering directed by Abdul Razak Mohaideen in the role of Shakila. Elly was paired with Yassin Yahya, a former member of the group Senario. Despite playing the main role, the scenes involving her were filmed for only 10 days. In that short time, she had to make commitments on location. This film was released on 20 December 2004.

Elly returned to her role as Detective Mazlein in GK3 The Movie which was released on 9 February 2005. From 22 October 2007 to 31 January 2008, Elly became one of the six main actors of the first season of Spa Q together with Norish Karman, Farahdhiya, Betty Banafe, Nisha Dirr and Intan Azura where she played the role of Farah, one of the Spa Q staff. She then appeared in the drama Bella on Slot Akasia TV3' by playing two characters, namely the title character and Tengku Julia Sandra, then appeared in her first telefilm, Pelita Buluh.

In 2010, she played the title character in the drama Na O Mei directed by Fairuz Loy with a script by Rozie Rashid which was inspired by a true story about a Siamese girl who married a Malay man and had a child named Na O Mei. In this drama, Elly was paired with Adi Putra and Iqram Dinzly.

Elly and Iqram then worked together again by starring in the horror drama Amukan Pocong together with Azhan Rani and Ezany Nizariff. She plays the role of Long Jamilah, this drama aired on slot Seram from 15 March to 7 June 2012. A year later, Elly acted alongside Scha Al-Yahya in the film Awan Dania The Movie, an adaptation of the Astro Ria drama series with the same title. It was his first film in 8 years since GK3 The Movie. She said about her character in this film: "I enjoyed playing the role of Tania and hope that fans will like the difference that I tried to highlight through my character this time.".

In 2014, Elly played the role of Mona in the drama Kristal Maya directed by her then-husband, Azmi Hatta, starring Amyra Rosli and Shahz Jaszle, and then played the role of Jenny in the drama Cinta Ibadah which contained 175 episodes.

Four years later, she became one of the main actors in the drama Vila Ghazara directed by Feroz Kader which also starred Shukri Yahaya, Hafeez Mikail, Amirul Faqeem, Mustapha Kamal and Haleeda. She plays the role of Maria, the second wife of Dr. Ghaz played by Mustapha Kamal. In addition, she also acted in Teratai Kemboja as Hanani and Aku Cinta Dia as Rima.

2019 was the busiest year in Elly's acting career where she acted in 7 television dramas and 2 telefilms. Among her acting dramas throughout the year were Patah Sayap Bertongkat Paruh in the MegaDrama slot Astro Ria starring Aaron Aziz and Fasha Sandha, she played the role of Hanani and Kau Yang Pertama in the Akasia slot TV3 starring Fikry Ibrahim and Farah Nabilah playing the role of Kak Zaza. Her biggest success in her acting career came through her role as Mona/Minah in the comedy drama Kampung People which paired her with Rashidi Ishak and new actors, Riena Diana and Hun Haqeem. Produced by KL Motion Pictures, the drama which aired on TV3's Lestary slot from 11 December 2019 to 8 January 2020 became a commercial success and received positive reviews from television critics and warganet. She also appeared in two telefilms that year, Siapa Dia Sebenarnya and Maaf Dari Khilaf.

Elly next acted alongside Aeril Zafrel and Nabila Razali in the drama adaptation of the novel, Seindah Tujuh Warna Pelangi playing the role of Maryam. She then returned to play the role of Mona in Kampung People 2, followed by the role of Sheila in Keluarga Epik.

=== Presentation ===
Completing her career portfolio, Elly Mazlein took on the role of one of the 12 award presenters at the Screen Awards 2018 and Screen Awards 2019 where she was paired with Shuk Sahar. He then hosted the 32nd Berita Harian Popular Star Awards with AC Mizal which took place on 22 December 2019.

He also served as a regular host of the reality TV show Lagu Cinta Kita with Azwan Ali and Michael Ang as co-hosts. It is adapted from the show Love At First Sight published by CJ ENM. Starting 1 March 2021, he became the host of the show Borak Kelamin with Awal Ashaari on Astro Ria. This show discusses topics about marriage related to household issues that are often considered taboo or sensitive to discuss openly.

Elly then hosted a casual cooking show, Kampung Pom Pom Letops! which began premiering on Naura HD starting 21 August 2021. Since 2021, she has been a permanent host of MeleTOP, replacing Neelofa who left the show in December 2019.

In 2022, Elly became the new host of Gegar Vaganza to replace Jihan Muse.

In 2023, Elly was paired with Amelia Henderson, Sean Lee and Radin ERA for the Gempak Most Wanted Awards 2022 and then paired with Rina Nose to host the Big Stage season five program.

=== Sponsorship and Community Service ===
- Malaysian Red Crescent Society – Campaign Ambassador – 2002–2004
- Safi Balqis – Spokesperson and Product Ambassador – 2004 – 2007
- Lentik Dara by Ayden Rizqi – Product Ambassador – 2017–2019
- Minyak Masak Kijang Gold – Product Ambassador – 2021 – present

== Personal life ==
Elly has been married twice. She married drama director, Azmi Hatta, on 9 November 2014. However, their marriage only lasted 11 months. Their marriage resulted in the birth of a daughter, Princess Sara Sefhia. Elly reportedly said in an interview with Berita RTM that she is already in love with a man.

After 5 years of being alone, Elly has met the love of her life, Mohamad Azlan Che Nuh, an educator who teaches the subject of Geography and is also 10 years younger than Elly. On 18 January 2020, they decided to get married. She announced her second pregnancy in April 2021.

On 23 October 2021, Elly and her husband Mohamad Azlan were blessed with a baby boy, who was named Haider Mateen.

== Discography ==
=== Studio album ===
1. Sutera Kasih (album) (1997)
2. Satu Persatu (album) (1999)
3. Elly (album) (2001)
4. Elly:Best of Ballads (2002)
5. Atas Nama Cinta (album) (2003)

== Filmography ==
=== Films ===
Year	Title	Character	Notes
2003	Janji Diana	Etty	First acting film
2004	Tangkai Jering	Syakila	
2005	GK3 The Movie	Detektif Mazlin	
2013	Awan Dania The Movie	Tania	
2015	Kapsul	Rahimah	
2021	Hantu Ke Lima	Kam	
2023	Gui	Rasyidah	

=== Drama ===
Year	Title	Character	TV Channel	Notes
2002–2005	Gerak Khas	Detective Mazlein	TV2	First drama
2005–2006	Bukan Yang Pertama	Yasmin	TV2	
2005–2007	Sembilu Kasih	Mastura	TV3	
2008	Bella	Bella/ Tengku Julia Sandra	TV3	
2008	Spa Q	Farah	TV3	
2008	Cinta Batu Belah	Saffiya	TV3	
2009	Amanah Karmila	Karmila	TV2	
2009	Senandung Si Dayang	Megasari	TV3	
2009	Sampai Syurga	Saniah	TV3	
2009	Keliwon (Season 1)	Suri/ Vampire	TV3	Episode: "Pontianak"
2009	Keliwon (Season 2)	Sarah/ Penanggal Ghost	TV3	Episode: "Tikar Mengkuang"
2009	Keliwon (Season 2)	Mastura/ Grave Ghost	TV3	Episode: "Hantu Kubur"
2009	Sumpah Bunian	Azeera	TV3	
2010	Na O Mei	Na O May	TV3	
2010	Ulek Mayang	Princess Mayang Sari	TV3	
2011	Mistik Alam Hitam	Ros	Astro Ria & Astro Prima	Episode: "Polong Bealan"
2012	Amukan Pocong	Long Jamilah	TV3	
2013	Firdausi Cinta		TV1	
2013–2015	Ema Emyliana	Rina	TV3	
2014	Kristal Maya	Mona	TV3	
2014	Mencari Cinta	Maira	TV1	
2014–2015	Cinta Ibadah	Jenny	Astro Prima	
2015	Doa Tiga Wanita		TV1	
2016	Amsyar	Karmila	TV9	
2018	Teratai Kemboja	Hanani	TV3	
2018	Vila Ghazara	Maria	TV3	
2018	Jenaka Kampung Pisang (Season 4)	Luna	TV3	Episode: "Mencari Rezeki"
2018	Mencari Qiblat		TV3	
2018	Aku Cinta Dia	Rima	TV3	
2019	Payah Sayap Bertongkat Paruh	Hasnah	Astro Ria	
2019	Diari Ramadhan Rafique Reunion	Jiha	TV3	
2019	Ajari Playboy Itu	Haliza	TV3	
2019	Kau Yang Pertama	Kak Zaza	TV3	
2019	Dapur Kita	Elyana	TV3	
2019	Pengantin Lelaki Untuk Cik Gadis	Yasmin	Astro Ria	
2019–2020	Kampung People	Mona/ Minah	TV3	
2020	Seindah Tujuh Warna Pelangi	Maryam	TV3	
2020	Kampung People (Season 2)	Mona/ Minah/ Meringue	TV3	
2020	SMK (Season 2)	Cikgu Aini	Astro Ceria	
2021	Keluarga Epik	Sheila	TV3	
2021	Ramadan Pertama Edi	Naemah	Astro Ria	
2022	Lockdown 2		Astro Ria	
2022	SMK (Season 4)	Teacher Aini	Astro Ceria	
2022	Kampung People (Season 3)	Mona/ Meringue/ Moni Segamat	TV3	
2022	Gila Viral	Dr. Zara	Astro Warna	
2023	One Million Dollar Voice	Miss Lina	Astro Ria	
2023	Sherry Supir	Sherry	TV Okey	
2025	Juwatan Ekspres		Astro Ceria	
2025	Hikayat Batu Belah Batu Bertangkup	Grandmother	Astro Ceria	
TBA	Misi Solat 5 Waktu		Astro Ceria	

=== Telefilm ===
Year	Title	Character	TV Channel	Notes
1999	Gerhana Di Mata Kabus Di Hati		TV1	First telefilm
2007	Pelita Buluh	Engku Zarina	TV3	
2009	Pulangkan...		Astro Ria	
2011	Hantu Gigi	Ain	Astro Prima	
2011	Zuriat Suamiku	Sarah	TV9	
2012	Calon Suamiku	Dr. Aida	Astro Prima	
2012	Demi Suffian	Salmah	TV3	
2014	Sepahtu Kepok Bonda	Elly	Astro Warna	
2016	Opah Bahulu Lola Cupcake	Intan	TV1	
2016	Jatuh Cinta Buta	Herself	Astro Ria	Special appearance
2017	Ketupat Buat Nenek	Maria	TV9	
2017	Riuh Raya Kak Mah	Sofia	Astro Warna	
2017	Asam Pedas Pewitt	Nuri	TV3	
2017	Siapa Dia Sebenarnya	Prof. Julia	TV3	
2019	Maaf Dari Khilaf	Rosnah	TV3	
2020	Ratahan Al-Marid	Nina	Astro Citra	
2022	Puaka Janda	Mariam	Astro Citra	
2024	Terompak Sana Tertukar Sini	Julia	Astro Warna	

=== Television ===
Year	Title	Role	TV Channel	Notes
2016	Gegar Vaganza (season 3)	Participants	Astro Ria	
2016	MeleTOP	Guest Artist	Astro Ria	
2017	Maharaja Lawak Mega 2017	Guest Artist	Astro Warna	Week 7 (Theme: Ayat Power), with the Puteh group
2017	MeleTOP	Guest Artist	Astro Ria	
2017	Ketuk-Ketuk Ramadan	Guest Artist	TV1	Episode 3
2018	Bintang Bersama Bintang	Guest Artist	TV3	
2018	Wanita Hari Ini	Guest Artist	TV3	Criteria for Preferred Match
2018	Mentor Otai	Host	TV3	with Haziq Hussni
2018	Drop The Beat	Participants	NTV7	
2018	Game Time	Guest Artist	NTV7	
2018	Borak Kopitiam	Guest Artist	TV3	
2018	Melodi: KFC Membawang Dalam Kereta	Guest Artist	TV3	
2018	Anugerah Skrin 2018	Host	TV3	with Shuk Sahar
2019	Muzikal Lawak Superstar (Season 2)	Participants	Astro Ria	Libra group
2019	Wanita Hari Ini	Guest Artist	TV3	
2019	Mentor Milenia	Host	TV3	with Shuk Sahar
2019	Senang Terhibur	Guest Artist	TV3	Episode 4 (with Ruhainies and W.A.R.I.S)
2019	32th Berita Harian Popular Star Award	Host	TV3	with Dato' AC Mizal
2019	5 Rencah 5 Rasa	Guest Artist	TV3	Episode 2
2019	Screen Award	Host	TV3	with Shuk Sahar
2019	The Sherry Show	Guest Artist	TV3	Episode 9
2019	Bintang Bersama Bintang (Season 2)	Host	TV3	
2020	Mahligai Cinta	Himself	TV3	Elly Mazlein & Mohd Azlan Che Nuh's Wedding
2020	MeleTOP	Guest Artist	Astro Ria	
2020	Wanita Hari Ini	Guest Artist	TV3	
2020	Keringat Selebriti	Himself	Awesome TV	Episode 3
2020	Masak Apa Tu?	Himself	TV3	Episode 8
2020	Wanita Hari Ini	Guest Artist	TV3	
2020–2021	Lagu Cinta Kita (Season 2)	Host	TV3	with Azwan Ali
2020–2021	Muzikal Lawak Superstar (season 2)	Host	Astro Warna	with Nabil Ahmad
2021	Borak Kelamin	Host	Astro Ria	with Awal Ashaari
2021	Malaysia Hari Ini	Guest Artist	TV3	
2021	Senduk Kuali Kak Lina Pom Pom	Host	TV1	
2021	Perang Prank	Host	Astro Warna	
2021	Kampung Pom Pom Letops!	Host	Naura HD	
2021	Gegar Vaganza (season 8)	Guest Host	Astro Ria	
2021–present	MeleTOP	Guest Host	Astro Ria	
2021–2023	Sumbang Suara	Host	TV3	
2022	Melodi	Guest Host	TV3	
2022	Big Stage (season 4)	Guest Host	Astro Ria	
2022	Mic ON! (Season 2)	Guest Host	Awesome TV	
2022	Mana Satu	Host	Astro Ria	
2022	Kelentang Kelentung Pom Pom	Host	Astro Ria	
2022	Gegar Vaganza Semangat Nak Raya	Host	Astro Ria	with Nabil Ahmad
2022	Muzikal Lawak Superstar (Season 3)	Host	Astro Warna	with Sharnaaz Ahmad
2022	Gegar Vaganza (season 9)	Host	Astro Ria	with Nabil Ahmad
2022	Ceria Popstar Xtra 2022	Host	Astro Ceria	with Nabil Ahmad
2022–2023	All Together Now Malaysia (season 2)	Jury	Astro Ria	
2022–2023	The Masked Singer Malaysia (season 3)	Jury	Astro Warna	
2023	Gempak Most Wanted Awards 2022	Host	Astro Ria	with Radin Era, Amelia Henderson & Sean Lee
2023	Yang Paling Padu	Host	Astro Ria	with Nabil Ahmad
2023	Big Stage (season 5)	Host	Astro Ria	Host with Rina Nose
2023	Sepahtu Reunion Live 2023	Zack/ Zakiah	Astro Warna	Guest Artist: Episode "Izinkan Aku Berubah"
2023	Dapur Vaganza	Host	Astro Ria	
2023	All Stars Gegar Vaganza	Host	Astro Ria	with Nabil Ahmad & Jihan Muse until week 3
2023	The Masked Singer Malaysia (season 4)	Jury	Astro Warna	
2024	Yak Yak Yey!	Various	Astro Warna	
2024	No Filter	Host	Astro Ria	
2024	Kilauan Emas	Host	Astro Prima	Season 6
2025	Big Stage Alpha	Host	Astro Ria	with Rina Nose

=== As a participant ===
Gegar Vaganza (season 3)
Sunday	Theme	Song	Decision	Ref
Week 1	Kembali Menyengat	"Usah Ditambah Bara Yang Tersimpan originally song by Elly Mazlein	SAFE	
Week 2	Memori Berkasih	"Berpisah Jua" original song Ziana Zain	SAFE	
Week 3	Ada Bran?	"Perawan Atau Janda" original song Cita Citata	SAFE	
Week 4	Duet Vaganza	"Jangan Menangis Sayang" original song Safura & Oney (duet with Acong Sweetchild)	PULL YOURSELF	

Drop The Beat
Sunday	Round	Theme	Song	Decision
Week 1	Round 1	KPOP	"I Will Show You" original song Ailee	WINNER
Week 1	Round 2	SPONTAN	"Pudariginal song Rossa	WINNER
Week 8	Round 1	BOLLYWOOD'	"Ladki Badi Anjani Hai" originally sung by Kumar Sanu & Alka Yagnik	3RD PLACE
Week 8	Round 2	HIP HOP'	"Lose My Breathe" original song Destiny's Child	3RD PLACE

== Radiography ==
=== Radio ===
Year	Title	Station
9 October 2022 – 8 November 2025	Carta Era 40	Era

== Awards and nominations ==
=== Recording Industry Association of Malaysia (RIM) ===
Recording Industry Association of Malaysia (RIM)
Year	Product	Certificate	Note
2000	Satu Persatu	1 x Platinum	Physical sales – 50,000 units
2002	Elly	2 x Platinum	Physical sales – 60,000 units
2003	Best of Ballads	1 x Gold	Physical sales – 25,000 units

Award	Year	Category	Recipient/Nominated work	Results	Ref.
Berita Harian Popular Star Award	2024	Popular TV Host	Elly Mazlein	Nominated	—N/a
Berita Harian Popular Star Award	2023	Popular TV Host	Elly Mazlein	Won	—N/a
Berita Harian Popular Star Award	2020	Popular Female TV Actress	Elly Mazlein	Nominated	
Berita Harian Popular Star Award	2020	Popular Versatile Artist	Elly Mazlein	Nominated	
Berita Harian Popular Star Award	2020	Popular TV Host	Elly Mazlein	Nominated	
Berita Harian Popular Star Award	2020	Popular Drama Matching	Elly Mazlein & Rashidi Ishak via Kampung People	Nominated	
ERA Digital Muzik Awards	2020	ONZ Viral Song	"Empat Dara 2020" (duet with Faizal Tahir and Zizi Kirana)	Nominated	—N/a
MeleTOP Era Awards	2020	Versatile MeleTOP Artist SYOK	Elly Mazlein	Nominated	—N/a
Seri Angkasa Awards	2016	Best Female Radio Actress	Elly Mazlein through the radio drama Detik Itu broadcast on Radio Klasik	Won	—N/a
Drama Festival Kuala Lumpur	2015	Choice Drama Cast	Shahz Jaszle, Amyra Rosli, Elly Mazlein, Ryzal Jaafar, Erry Putra, Syatilla Melvin and Amar Baharin through the drama Kristal Maya	Nominated	—N/a
Entertainment Media Awards	2002	New Talented Actor	Elly Mazlein	Nominated	—N/a
Anugerah Juara Lagu	2000	Separuh Afir Muzik Muzik (Ballad)	"Usha Duduk Bara Yang Tersimpan"	Nominated	—N/a
