= Namie Smy =

Namie
- Born: Najmi bin Shaharudin; 17 September 1996 (age 28); Batu Kikir, Negeri Sembilan, Malaysia
- Occupations: Actor; Comedian; Host Television; Singer; Radio Presenter
- Years active: 2022–present
- Employer: Astro Radio (since 2023)
- Spouse: Izzatul Akma (m. 2021)
- Musical career
- Instrument: Vocal
- Labels: Rusa Music

Najmi bin Shaharudin or better known as Namie (born 17 September 1996) is a Malaysian actress, comedian, host, singer, and radio presenter.

== Discography ==
=== Single ===
Year	Title	Composer	Lyricist	Notes
2020	In the Beginning	Himself & Faez Farhan		
2023	Chegu	Zai Hamzah & Triplouz A	Achoi Floor 88, Triplouz A, Matzen & Himself	
2024	Raya Ya Ya Ya (feat. Fariq, Aidilia Hilda, Keka & Qistina Khaled)	Zai Hamzah	Aideed Albasyier, Mat Zen & Muhammad Fakikh	
2024	Apa Lagi	Aepul Roza	Aepul Roza & Himself	

== Filmography ==
=== Movies ===
Year	Title	Character	Note
2022	Gadis Jolobu The Movie		The first movie
2023	Bawang Putih Bawang Holland	Mat Psiko	
2024	Yie Prehhh	Pok Yie	
2024	Manaf, Zahir and Bunian	Manaf	
2024	Rampok		

=== Drama ===
Year	Title	Character	TV channels	Note
2025	Siapa Viral?	Ran Ranger	Suria Mediacorp	The first play; Singapore drama

=== Telemovie ===
Year	Title	Character	TV Channel	Notes
2023	Hentian Gerik	Shakir	Astro Warna	First telemovie

=== Television ===
Year	Title	As	Group	TV Channel	Notes	Results
2022	Muzikal Lawak Superstar (season 3)	Contestants	Ubi	Astro Warna	With Fad & Sharif Zero	Winner
2023–present	Ubi Superstar Live	Various Characters		Astro Warna		
2023	Mic ON! Selebriti	Participant		Awesome TV		
2023	Gelak 90 Saat	Participant		Astro Warna	With Achey Bocey	
2023	The Chosen One (Season 1)	Host		Astro Ceria	With Alif Satar	
2023–24	The Masked Singer Malaysia (season 4)	Participant (Mat Helang)		Astro Warna		Runner-up
2023–present	MeleTOP	Guest Host		Astro Ria		
2024	Muzikal Lawak Superstar (season 4)	Participants	Paddy	Astro Warna	With Fad & Are Toy	Runner-up
2024	90 Seconds of Laughter 2	Lawyer		Astro Warna	With Issey	

== Radiography ==
=== Radio ===
Year	Title	Station
11 February 2023 – present	Sabtu Pagi ERA	Era
4 March 2025 – 4 April 2025	3 Pagi Era	Era
