= Siti Elizad =

Malaysian actress

- سيتي ايليزد
- Born: Siti Elizad binti Mohd Sharifuddin; 25 May 1984 (age 42); Kuala Lumpur, Malaysia
- Other names: Elizad Sharifuddin, Ejad
- Education: Sijil Pelajaran Malaysia (SPM)
- Occupations: Actor; Host Television; Radio Presenter; Singer
- Years active: 1994–present
- Employer: Astro Radio (2019-23)
- Height: 5 ft 7 in (1.70 m)
- Spouse: Shamsul Baharin Rahman (m. 2015)
- Parent(s): Mohd Sharifuddin Baharuddin (father); Nazariah Mohd Salleh (mother)

Siti Elizad Mohd Sharifuddin (born 25 May 1984) is a Malaysian actress, host and radio presenter. She began her acting career as a child actor since 1994. She was introduced through the film directed by Bade Hj. Azmi, Berlari Ke Langit as the main character.

In addition, her name rose again through the drama series slot Akasia on TV3, namely the drama Teman Lelaki Upahan, playing the role of Kyra Lydia. Among her famous dramas are Lambaian Ramadan, Sikolot Suamiku, Syurga Yang Kedua, Aku Yang Kau Tinggalkan and Mentua.

Siti Elizad became a female radio presenter on Sinar. FM from 2019 to 2023 for the Duo Sinar segment with Hefny Sahad and also the morning segment, Pagi Di Sinar with Jep Sepahtu, Rahim R2 and Angah.

Her appearance in the 1990s was contemporary with Bell Ngasri, Anne Ngasri, Zul Huzaimy, Shaheizy Sam, Zizie Ezette, Lisa Surihani and Liyana Jasmay as well as other actors who began to be active since the 1990s.

== Early life ==
Siti Elizad, more affectionately known as Ejad, was born on 25 May 1984 in Kuala Lumpur and is the fourth child of five siblings to the couple Mohd Sharifuddin Baharuddin (born 1947) and Nazariah Mohd Salleh (1951-2013), she is the only daughter in her family and also graduated with a Sijil Pelajaran Malaysia (SPM).

== Career ==
Siti Elizad began her acting career in 1994 at the age of 10 as a child actress on TV Pendidikan owned by the Education Technology Division, Ministry of Education Malaysia. However, she left acting because she wanted to focus on her studies.

In 1998, at the age of 14, she participated in the 'Asia Bagus' competition in Singapore. Not stopping there, she also tried her luck by attending the auditions for the third season of the show 'One in a Million' which aired in 2008.

After completing Form 5, Siti Elizad returned to active life in 2002 by working as a model and once participated in Puteri Era Felisa and was crowned the third place winner. In 2004, she starring in his debut film, Running to the Sky directed by Bade Hj. Azmi, played by Datuk Rosyam Nor, Fasha Sandha and Hasnul Rahmat, in this film, he plays the role of Zulhijjah. Next, in 2005, he starred in two films — Gangster' directed by Bade Hj. Azmi and 'Rock directed by Mamat Khalid.

He then took a break from the entertainment industry for seven years from 2006 to 2013 to take care of his mother, the late Nazariah Mohd Salleh, until her mother died.

Siti Elizad became the main lead in the drama adaptation of the 2014 novel titled Teman Lelaki Upahan by Azura Rasiddin for Slot Akasia TV3, where she played the role of Kyra Lydia. She was paired with actor Ungku Ismail Aziz, and then she appeared in the supertelefilm Travelling Beruang which also created a cancer awareness campaign with the same name, where every fund raised was channeled to the National Cancer Council (MAKNA).

After Teman Lelaki Upahan, she appeared in two more drama series, 'Dia Isteri Luar Biasa' and 'Aku Pilih Kamu as well as the film 'Coverina with Pekin Ibrahim. Elizad once again teamed up with Ungku Ismail in the telefilm Jubah Untuk Airin which filled the drama slot of Panggung Seri on 16 July, at 9.30 pm on TV1. This telefilm directed by Mohd Al-Bakari Harith and produced by Ardwerk Production Sdn Bhd revolves around the conflicts and confusion that beset Airin in her life, also starring Uqasha Senrose, Ammar Titan and Mubarak Majid.

She is also talented in the field of music when she participated in the reality TV show Gempak Superstar which aired on Astro Ria. She was crowned the champion and received RM100,000 in cash along with a trophy donated by Astro. Her own mother, the late Hamah Nazariah, during her lifetime once expressed her dream of seeing Elizad make a name for herself in the field of voice art.

In 2016, she appeared in the drama 'Lambaian Ramadan in conjunction with the month of Ramadan, and then acted with Amar Baharin in the drama series 'Si Kolot Suamiku on Astro Ria. In the drama, which was adapted from the novel of the same title by Fazlyn Ridz, Elizad plays the role of Tengku Nur Edrina, a stubborn child with a high ego because her father is of royal lineage and her mother was born among the nobility. However, the friendly acting between Elizad and Amar in the drama has caused some viewers to feel uncomfortable because of Elizad's status as someone's wife.

In 2019, Siti Elizad appeared in the Slot Widuri RTM drama, Aku Yang Kau Tinggalkan where she played the role of Nia Athirah, paired again with Ungku Ismail Aziz who played the role of Zaril Ikhwan. This drama was also said to be hot, and was subsequently nominated in the Best Series Drama category at the 2019 Screen Awards.

From 15 July 2019 to 24 November 2023, she was one of the female radio presenters on Sinar FM radio. He then took a break from acting to focus on his career as a radio presenter. However, after stopping his career as a radio presenter, Elizad returned to his original passion, which was acting. starring in a TV3 drama in the Lestary slot titled Mentua with Fauziah Ahmad Daud and Syarul Ezani.

== Gempak Superstar ==
=== Performance ===
During her performance at Gempak Superstar, Siti Elizad sang the following songs:

1. Week 1: "Tiada Lagi" original song by Mayang Sari
2. Week 2: "Ku Bahagia" original song by Melly Goeslaw
3. Week 3: "Pengemis Cinta" original song by Ella
4. Week 4: "I'ris" original song by Awie and "Cintaku 100%" original song by Mas Idayu
5. Week 5: "Gerimis Mengundang" original song by Slam (duet with Ronnie Hussein)
6. Week 6: "Makhluk Tuhan Paling Sexy" original song by Mulan Jameela and "Ketulusan Hati" original song by Anuar Zain

=== Elimination chart ===
Week:		1 (10/Apr)	2 (April 17)	3 (April 24)	4 (1/May)	Semi-Final (8/May)	End (May 15)
Position	Participant	Results					
1	Siti Elizad'	Stay	First	2nd	2nd	3rd (3rd Last)	Champion

== Personal life ==
Elisad's parents have health problems. Her father, Mohd Sharifuddin Baharuddin, has an eye disease, while her mother, Nazariah Mohd Salleh, has Parkinson's disease and died in January 2013. Elizad is the niece of actress Asmahani Hussein.

Elizad married on 11 January 2015 with a single vow. Her wedding ceremony was held privately with only her closest family members in attendance.

== Filmography ==
=== Films ===
Year	Title	Character	Notes
2004	Berlari Ke Langit	Zulhijjah	First film
2005	Gangster	Ria	
2005	Rock	Khatijah @ Kathy	
2006	Bilut	Mariam	
2006	Main-Main Cinta	Sarimah	
2007	Cinta Yang Satu	Jamilah	
2009	Lembing Awang Pulang Ke Dayang	Dayang	
2012	Mael Lambong	Awek Cun	Special appearance
2014	Tembus	Anissa	
2015	Coverina	Rina	
2016	Harmonika	Ika	
2017	Kolestrol vs Cinta	Suria	
2018	Takdir The Movie	Soffiya	Charity Film Screening
2021	18 Puasa Di Kampong Pisang	Kiambang	Astro First
2021	Antara Pintu	Ibu	Astro Gempak Shortfilm
2021	Kampong Pisang Muzikal Raya Istimewa	Kiambang	Astro First

=== Drama ===
Year	Title	Character	TV Channel	Notes
2006	Ejen 016	Alpha 0146	TV3	First Drama
2007	Mas Kahwin	Mas	Astro Prima	
2007	Bayang-Bayang Musyrik		TV1	
2008	Ezora	Farah/Sarah	TV3	
2009	La Dolce Amira	Maznah	TV3	
2009	Rempit vs Impak Maksima	Fila	TV3	
2010	Adnan Sempit the Series		Astro Warna	
2011	Cinta Antara Kita	Dania	TV3	
2011	Jamilah I Love You		Astro Ria	
2011	Antara Garisan		Astro Ria	
2012	Opah: Hadirmu Satu Anugerah		TV1	
2013	Iman Nabila	Yasmin	TV3	
2013	Tanah Kubur (Season 8)	Faridah	Astro Oasis	Episode: "Zalim Dusta"
2013	Jihad Iskandar	Mila	Astro Prima	
2013	Aku Isterinya	Lisa	TV3	
2013	Kerana Lelaki Itu	Diana	TV9	
2014	Jiwa	Fara	TV3	
2014	Tanah Kubur (Season 10)	Murni	Astro Oasis	Episode: "Pukau Jin"
2014	Alam Maya	Kina	TV9	
2014	Tanah Kubur (Season 12)	Mariam	Astro Oasis	Episode: "Fitnah"
2014	Kerana Terpaksa Aku Relakan	Ilyana	TV3	
2014	Masihkah Ada Cinta	Leen	TV3	
2015	Teman Lelaki Upahan	Kyra Lydia	TV3	
2015	Dia Isteri Luar Biasa	Kak Long Zahra	TV3	
2015	Aku Pilih Kamu	Nadiya	TV3	
2015	Kifarah Mistik	Milah	TV3	Episode: "Mandi Bunga"
2015	Sirah	Niza	TV3	Episode: "Cukur Jambul"
2016	Bodyguard		TV3	
2016	Lambaian Ramadan	Shila	TV3	
2016	Si Kolot Suamiku	Tengku Edrina	Astro Ria	
2017	Papa Ricky	Zara	Astro Prima	
2017	My Darling, Inspector Daniel	Inspector Hannah	Astro Ria	
2017	Syurga Yang Kedua	Sabrina	Astro Prima	
2018–2020	Gerak Khas	Sophia	TV2	Guest actor
2018	Dian	Dian	ntv7	
2018	Dapur Kongsi	Mia	ntv7	
2019	Cinta Tanpa Henti	Maya	TV3	
2019	Aku Yang Kau Tinggalkan	Nia Athirah	TV1	
2019	Puteri Yang Ditukaran	Aini/Ustazah Ainol	Astro Prima	
2020	Safi Elixir ke Hatimu	Elisa	TV3	
2020	Bila Cupid Jatu Cinta	Sheila	TV3	Special appearance
2020	Jalan Sesat Ke Syurga	Inara	Astro Prima	
2021	Sayap Bagimu	Kak Siti	TV3	Sitcom
2021	Hati Yang Dikhianati	Tasya	Astro Prima	
2024	Mentua	Emilia	TV3	
2024	Berbahagi Suami	Bella	Astro Prima	

=== Web drama ===
Year	Title	Character	Network	Notes
2018	Ghaib	Inspektor Anita	Tonton	Drama adapted from the novel Projek Seram Terowong
2024	Restu	Sara	IQIYI	

=== Telefilm ===
Year	Title	Character	TV Channel
2012	Bersalji Di Kuala Lumpur	Nadia	Astro Citra
2013	Korban Kasih	Amanina	TV AlHijrah
2013	Mr Feminin	Lisa	TV9
2014	Pilihan Rozana	Suraya	TV3
2014	Mambo No. 5		
2014	Kekabu Anjang		TV2
2014	Angsa Masak Chibai	Lisa	TV3
2014	Anak Aku Bukan Milik Aku	Maya	TV3
2015	Sebelum Takbir Bergema	Asmira	TV3
2015	Kasih Kamelia	Kamelia	TV3
2015	Hanya Suara	Aina	TV1
2015	Pencinta	Arissa	TV1
2015	Mimi Tapau	Salmi	TV3
2015	Isteriku Bukan Tukang Masak	Hana	Astro Maya HD
2015	Traveling Beruang	Miss Kat	TV3
2015	Bukan Wanita Sempurna	Liza	TV3
2016	Dendam Manisa	Manisa	TV3
2016	Ayah Den Lopeh	Siti	Astro Ria
2016	Jubah Untuk Airin	Airin	TV1
2016	Janji Hati	Karmila	TV2
2016	Duit Raya	Syarmin	TV9
2016	Payung Emas	Nora	TV AlHijrah
2017	Berebut Kasih	Hawa	TVi
2017	Poisi Sadih Al-Kitab	Nadirah	TV3
2017	Rasuk	Marina	Astro Citra
2017	Menuntu Malam Raya	Leha	Astro Ria
2018	Kampung Kuala Lambat	Murni	Astro Citra
2018	Setan Dalam Poket	Yati	Astro Citra
2018	Tulus Cinta	Maira Suraya	TV3
2018	Telingkah	Tun Fatimah	TV2
2019	Selai Selendang Putih	Zahra	TV3
2019	Kipas Belum Mati	Eliza	Astro Citra
2021	Angkara Dendam	Manja	Astro Citra
2023	Sepahtu Rewang Kampung Kenangan	Kak Ejad	Astro Warna
2024	Kasihnya Angah	Shida	TV3
2024	Overnight Wali	Juni	Astro Ria
2024	Antara Pilihan	Hani	TV1

=== Television ===
Year	Title	Role	TV Channel	Notes
2016	Betul Ke Bohong?	Couple Group	Astro Warna	Episode 13 (Final)
2016	Gempak Superstar	Contestants	Astro Ria	Winner
2016	Sepahtu Reunion Live 2016	Sabariah	Astro Warna	Guest Artist: Episode "Alahai Kasim"
2017	Super Spontan Superstar	Guest Artist	Astro Warna	
2017	Sepahtu Reunion Live 2017	Fatimah	Astro Warna	Guest Artist: Episode "Dari Keratong ke Kota London"
2017	Perang Jantina	Host	Astro Ria	
2017	29th Malaysian Film Festival	Host	Astro Ria	Co-host Zizan Razak
2017	Rockanova 2017	Guest Jury	Astro Prima	
2017	MeleTOP	Host	Astro Prima	Guest host with Nabil Ahmad
2018	Super Spontan Xtravaganza	Participants	Astro Warna	Sotong Kangkung Group
2018	The Sherry Show & Friends	Host	TV3	Guest host with Sherry Alhadad
2019	Mingguan Wanita (Season 2)	Host	Astro Prima	
2019	Sepahtu Reunion Live 2019	Maria	Astro Warna	Guest Artist: Episode "Apa Dosaku"
2020	Warna Pecah Raya	Guest Artist	Astro Warna	
2020	Apa Ada Dengan Dot dot dot	Host	Astro Ria	
2021	Panggong Karoot	Guest Artist	Astro Warna	
2021	Apa Ada Dengan Dot dot dot (Season 2)	Host	Astro Ria	
2021	Bawang Live	Host	Astro Ria	Guest Lawyer
2021	Tak Kot Raya	Guest Artist	Astro Warna	
2021	Anugerah Malam Ini	Guest Artist	Awesome TV	
2021	Luahan Selebriti	Guest Artist	Astro Ria	
2021	Music Video Playback (MVP)	Host	Astro 100	
2021	Apa Ada Dengan Dot dot dot (Season 3)	Host	Astro Ria	
2021	Finding the Lost Sepahtu	Guest Jury	Astro Warna	
2022	Sepahtu Reunion Live Tour	Arinah	Astro Warna	Guest Artist: Episode "A Father's Mistake"
2024	Sahur Chat	Guest Artist	TV3	

=== Theater ===
Year	Title	Role	Venue
2006	Suzanna@60	Zunika	Istana Budaya

=== Music video ===
Year	Song title	Guest artist
2019	"Ratu"	Faizal Tahir

== Radiography ==
=== Radio ===
Year	Title	Station
15 July 2019 – 26 August 2022	Duo Sinar	Sinar
29 August 2022 – 24 November 2023	Pagi Di Sinar	Sinar

== Discography ==
Single
Year	Song title	Recording company	Notes
2016	"Haiyaya"	Paranormal Records	OST drama Encik Suami Mat Salih Celup

== Awards and nominations ==
Year	Awards	Category	Nominated work	Results
2015	29th Berita Harian Popular Star Awards	Popular Female TV Actress	—N/a	Nominated
2016	29th Berita Harian Popular Star Awards	Popular Female TV Actress	—N/a	Nominated
2017	2017 Kuala Lumpur Festival Drama Awards	Choice Actress	Lambaian Ramadan	Nominated
2018	2018 Screen Awards	Best Actress in a Drama	Tulus Cinta	Nominated
2020	33rd Daily News Popular Star Award	TV Actor, Host, Radio Presenter, Versatile Artist & Compatible Drama Couple	—N/a	Nominated
2021	Asia Contents Awards 2021	Best Short-form / Web Drama	Antara Pintu	Nominated
2023	35th Daily News Popular Star Award	Popular Radio Presenter	—N/a	Nominated
