= Farah Nabilah =

Malaysian actress and model (born 1992)

- فاره نبيله
- Born: Farah Nabilah binti Saipuddin; 10 March 1992 (age 34); Petaling Jaya, Selangor, Malaysia
- Other name: Fawa
- Education: Bachelor of Psychology
- Alma mater: SEGi University; Upper Iowa University, United States
- Occupations: Actress; Model
- Years active: 2012–present
- Height: 1.60 m (5 ft 3 in)
- Spouse: Mohammed Amirul Yunus (m. 2019)
- Children: 2
- Parents: Datuk Saipuddin Ahmad (father); Datin Haslina Ismail (mother)
- Family: Firdaus Affan (sister); Firdaus Azraai (sister); Farah Shahirah (sister); Firdaus El Muheymin (sister); Firdaus Adam (sister)

Farah Nabilah Saipuddin (born 10 March 1992) is a Malaysian actress and model. Starting her career in commercials in 2011, Farah's acting career began in 2012. She achieved commercial success and rose through her acting dramas including Titian Cinta (2017), Papa Ricky (2017) and Halalkan Hati Yang Ku Curi (2018). Among the awards she won include MeleTOP New Artist at the MeleTOP Era Awards 2018 and Popular Female New Artist at the 31st Berita Harian Popular Star Awards.

== Early life ==
Farah Nabilah was born on 10 March 1992 (corresponding to 6 Ramadan 1412 AH) in Petaling Jaya, Selangor. She is the eldest of six siblings, four boys and two girls, to Datuk Saipuddin bin Ahmad and Datin Haslina binti Ismail. Both of her parents are government retirees. She grew up in a Kelantan Malays family because both of her parents came from the Jelawat district, Kelantan who migrated to Selangor. She graduated with a Bachelor's Degree in Psychology from the Upper Iowa University Malaysia Campus Program and SEGi University.

== Career ==
Farah Nabilah, affectionately known as Fawa, began her entertainment career in 2011 as a model, but temporarily stopped because she was pursuing her Bachelor's Degree in Psychology at the University of Upper Iowa: Malaysia Campus Program, SEGi University. Four years later, she won the Aurawhite Face Search Program and has since become the spokesperson for Aurawhite products. In the early years of her career, she used the name Fawa before adopting her birth name as her stage name.

Farah's film career began with a successful role as a receptionist in a film directed by A. Razak Mohaideen Mana Mau Lari as a special appearance.

Her name first gained attention through the main role as Kathy in the drama series Papa Ricky starring Fadlan Hazim and Siti Elizad which was broadcast on Astro Ria. Farah was later paired with Zul Ariffin in the prime time drama Titian Cinta which was broadcast on Slot Akasia TV3. Her pairing with Zul earned Farah a nomination for Best Couple at the Kuala Lumpur Festival Drama Awards 2018 and won MeleTOP New Artist at the MeleTOP Era Awards 2018.

She starred with Aliff Aziz in the drama adaptation of Mia Kiff's novel, Halalkan Hati Yang Ku Curi, plays the role of Delisha. This drama tells the story of a married couple, Faiq (Aliff) and Delisha (Farah), who love freedom, luxury, and unlimited fun.

He together with Fikry Ibrahim became the presenter of the award for the Best Artist category at the Planet Music Awards 2018 which took place on 28 September 2018.

Farah acted with Fikry in the drama Cik Reen & Encik Ngok Ngek, which was adapted from the novel The Misadventures of Cik Reen & Encik Ngok Ngek by Maya Adira.

== Personal life ==
Farah Nabilah got engaged to Malaysia Airlines pilot Mohammed Amirul Yunus on 23 October 2019 and married on 20 December 2019. She announced her pregnancy on 10 June 2020.

Farah and husband, Amirul were blessed with a son, Andre Omar who was born on 22 October 2020.

== Humanitarian activities ==
Apart from being an actress, Farah Nabilah is also active in humanitarian activities. He was appointed as an ambassador for the Asia Africa Development Relief Foundation (ADRF), where he was involved in various programs involving children, Malay and English language teaching classes and other community activities.

== Filmography ==
=== Films ===
Year	Title	Characters	Notes
2014	Mana Mau Lari	Receptionist	First film, special appearance
2017	Baby Bro	Baby Sitter	Special appearance
2021	Dekatnya Cinta	Zulaika	

=== Drama ===
Year	Title	Character	TV channels	Note
2012		Gina	TV3	The first drama
2016	Imam Mudaku Romantis	Martyr	Astro Oasis	
2016	Inikah Cinta	Rose Adeline	TV3	
2017	Ustaz Pink	Zaharah	TV1	
2017	Papa Ricky	Kathy	Astro Prima	
2017	Titian Love	Rahadatul Aisy	TV3	
2017	Mocha Kau Bahagia	Melur	TV3	
2018	Mr. Grey	Talitha	Astro Ria	
2018	Halalkan Hati Yang Ku Curi	Delisha	TV3	
2018	Cik Reen & Encik Ngok Ngek	Azreen Che Azhan (Reen)	Astro Ria	
2018	Mocha Kau Bahagia 2	Melur	TV3	
2018	Amira Rose	Amira Rose	TV3	
2019	Kau Yang Pertama	Rose Natasha	TV3	
2022	Scammer 2	Liya	Astro Ria	
2025	Jadikan Aku Bidadari	Ezzatul	TV3	

=== Telefilm ===
Year	Title	Character	TV Channel
2016	Tersuka Tanpa Sengaja Raya	Melati	Astro Ria
2016	Mati, Tunggu Sekejap	Aishah	Astro Prima
2016	Tumbang Masjid Al-Ansar	Suraya	Astro Oasis
2016	Bidadari	Che Ah	Astro Citra
2018	Adakah Aku Bersalah	Tia	TV3
2020	Hantu Ustazah Supiah	Ustazah Supiah	Astro Citra
2020	Validasi	Muna	TV3

=== Television ===
Year	Title	Role	TV Channel	Notes
2017	Sepahtu Reunion Live 2017	Sofia	Astro Warna	Guest Artist: Episode: "Boxer Rabak"
2018	Anugerah Planet Muzik	Award Presenter	TVRI, Astro Ria & Mediacorp Suria	Presenting the Award with Fikry Ibrahim
2018	Bintang Bersama Bintang	Guest Jury	TV3	
2019	MeleTOP	Guest Host	Astro Ria	Being a Guest Host with Nabil Ahmad
2019	Sepahtu Reunion Live 2019	Bella	Astro Warna	Guest Artist: Episode "Korban Kasih Ayah"
2019	Cinta Overhaul Aidilfitri	Dhiya	Astro Warna	
2025	Sepahtu Reunion Live 2025	Misha	Astro Prima	Guest Artist: Episode "Maaf Yang Bermakna"

== Videography ==
=== Music video ===
Year	Title	Artist	Role
2012	"Jangan Ganggu Pacarku"	Aliff Aziz	Teman Wanita
2016	"Bayang"	Khai Bahar	Isteri Orang
2018	"Sejarah Cinta"	Syalyn Band	Bekas Kekasih
2018	"Meskipun Kau Tahu"	Projector Band	Bekas Kekasih

== Awards and nominations ==
Year	Award	Category	Nomination	Results
2018	MeleTOP Era Awards 2018	MeleTOP New Artist	Titian Cinta	Won
2018	5th Kuala Lumpur Festival Drama Awards	Choice Actress	Titian Cinta	Nominated
2018	5th Kuala Lumpur Festival Drama Awards	Choice Couple (with Zul Ariffin)	Titian Cinta	Nominated
2018	Berita Harian Popular Star Awards 2017	Popular Female TV Actress	Titian Cinta	Nominated
2018	Berita Harian Popular Star Awards 2017	Popular Female New Artist	Titian Cinta	Won
2018	Berita Harian Popular Star Awards 2017	Compatible Couple in Drama (with Zul Ariffin)	Titian Cinta	Nominated
2019	7th EH! Style Awards	Choice Promising Celebrity	—N/a	Nominated
2019	2019 Berita Harian Popular Star Awards	Couple Drama Compatible (with Fikry Ibrahim)	Ms. Reen & Mr. Ngok Ngek	Nominated
