= Zizi Kirana =

Malaysian musical artist (born 1985)

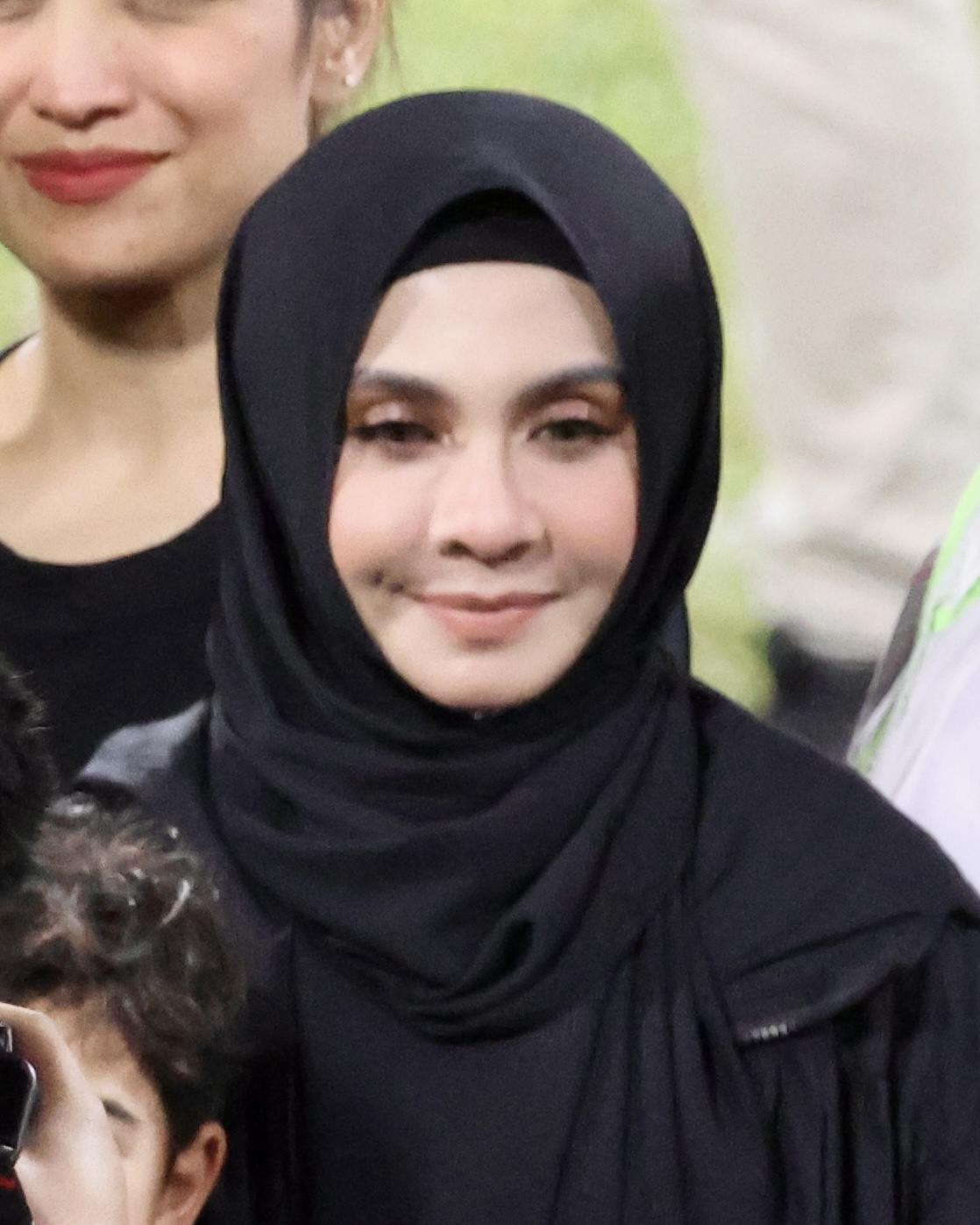
- Zizi in 2024.
- Born: Nur Fazelah binti Mad Tahil; 23 January 1985 (age 41); Semporna, Sabah, Malaysia
- Other names: Zizi AF7; Zizi The Fabulous Cats; Kirana
- Occupations: Singer; rapper; actress; host television
- Years active: 2009–present
- Spouse: Yusuf Bahrin (m. 2021; div. 2026)
- Parents: Mad Tahil (father); Fatimah Kassim (mother)
- Musical career
- Genres: Hip hop; rap; pop; R&B; ballad
- Instrument: Vocal
- Labels: Alibi; Mixology; Def Jam Recordings; Warner Music; Sony Music

Nur Fazelah binti Mad Tahil (born 23 January 1985) or better known as Zizi Kirana is a Malaysian singer, rapper, actress, product ambassador and female host.

She is a former participant of Akademi Fantasia in 2009 and a former member of the hip hop group, The Fabulous Cats. In addition, she also participated in the second season of the Indonesian reality television show, D'Academy Asia where she represented Malaysia.

== Music career ==
Zizi's singing career began after she joined Akademi Fantasia seventh season. However, her journey in AF7 came to an end in the fourth week concert when she was eliminated due to an SMS vote that was not in her favor at that time. After finishing AF7, Zizi joined the group The Fabulous Cats, which was pioneered by Cat Farish, Adeep Nahar and Wangi Julianda. With the group, she recorded several singles including "Cinta Kosmik" and "Pergilah Ayu" as well as the album Fabulousity. However, her relationship with The Fabulous Cats did not last long when the group disbanded in 2015.

Zizi then joined the group Nukilan, while with Nukilan, she rapped efficiently. However, Zizi's relationship with the group also did not last long when they disbanded. Zizi then participated in an Indonesian reality TV competition, D'Academy Asia season two, starting from this show she was known to fans both in Malaysia, and Indonesia.

=== Akademi Fantasia 7 ===
In 2009, Zizi was successfully selected as one of 14 students accepted into AF7. However, her journey stopped at the fourth week concert with another student from the same state as her, namely Rubisa. Here are her performances in the academy:

Concert	Original song & singer	#
Week 1	"Molek" song by Elyana	5th
Week 2	"Sembilu" song by Ella / "Wonder Women" sung by Mulan Jameela	6th
Week 3	"Ini Rindu" song by Farid Harja	7th
Week 4	"Aku Dah Bosan" song by Amy Search	Eliminated

=== D'Academy Asia 2 ===
Concert	Song	The original singer	Results
Top 36	"Hujan"	Erie Suzan	Safe
Top 36	"Bumi Semakin Panas"	Cucu Cahyati	Safe
Top 24	"Wassini"	Waheeda	Safe
Top 24	"Akhir Sebuah Cerita"	Evie Tamala	Safe
Top 18	"Maling"	Nita Thalia	Eliminated
Top 18	"Kun Anta"	Humood Alkhuder	Eliminated

== Personal life ==
=== Marriage ===
Zizi married actor Yusuf Bahrin on 19 September 2021; the couple divorced on 2 April 2026 with talak satu.

=== Activism ===
In August 2025, Zizi announced that she would join the Global Sumud Flotilla in order to bring humanitarian aid to the Gaza Strip and to break Israel's blockade of Gaza.

== Anugerah Juara Lagu ==
At the end of 2020, her song "Eh" finally qualified for the final stage of the 35th Juara Lagu Award, although initially many parties disputed the eligibility of the song "Eh" to the prestigious award stage. This was her first appearance on the AJL stage after almost 11 years as an artist.

== Discography ==
Album with The Fabulous Cats

- Fabulousity (2013)

Single with The Fabulous Cats

Year	Song	Album
2010	"Cinta Kosmik"	"Fabulousity"
2010	"Pergilah Ayu"	"Fabulousity"
2011	"Muncul Kamu"	Single
2013	"Sebulatnya"	Single

Single solo

Year	Song	Album
2017	"Rahsia Hati"	Single
2018	"Siapa Yang Bap Bap"	Single
2018	"NakKeTakNak"	Single
2018	"Boleh Jalan"	Single
2018	"Let"	Single
2019	"Gasoline"	Single
2019	"Eh"	Single
2021	"Tentu"	Single
2022	"Pijak"	Single

Collaborative single

Year	Song	Collaborate together	Single
2016	"Levitasi"	Fynn Jamal & Kaka Azraff	Single
2018	"Terkemuka"	Benzooloo & Sandra Dianne	Single
2019	"Yang Legit, Yang Legend"	Hael Husaini	Theme Song MeleTOP 2019
2019	"Starlela"	Ifa Raziah & Bella Astillah	Single
2019	"Mintak Lagi"	AVDR	Single
2019	"Khatulistiwa"	Haqiem Rusli	RTM Advertisement Theme Song

== Filmography ==
=== Movie ===
Year	Title	Role
2010	Cuti-Cuti Cinta	Faustina
2011	Hantu Bonceng	Mimi

=== Drama ===
Year	Title	Role	TV Channel	Notes
2021	Jamu Nesan	Madam Zoora	Unifi TV	First drama

=== Telefilm ===
Year	Title	Role	TV Channel	Notes
2013	Pian Kenan Balik Raya	Lydia	Astro Warna	First telefilm
2020	Bujang Raya Bersama	Tunang Eddy	TV1, TV2, TV Okey	

=== Television ===
Year	Title	Role	TV Channel	Notes
2009	Akademi Fantasia (season 7)	Participant	Astro Ria	Eliminated from Week 4 Concert
2015	Betul ke Bohong? (Season 7)	Guest Artist	Astro Warna	Episode 7
2016	D'Academy Asia (season 2)	Participant representing Malaysia	Indosiar	Eliminated from the Top 18 concert
2020	Shuk Nak Tanya	Guest artist	Awesome TV	Guest guest episode 9
2021	Tok Kata	Guest artist	Awesome TV	
2022	The Last Trio Standing	Host	Astro Ria	With Awal Ashaari
2023	The Masked Singer Malaysia (season 3)	Participant	Astro Warna	Sebagai Bertih Jagung
2024	The Hardest Singing Show	Participant	Astro Ria	
2025	Salam Baitullah	Host	TV1	With Fakhrul Radhi & Ustaz Jalal Zaiki

== Videography ==
=== Music video ===
Year	Song	Notes
2017	"Rahsia Hati"	
2018	"Siapa Yang Bap Bap"	
2018	"NakKeTakNak"	
2018	"Boleh Jalan"	
2019	"Yang Legit, Yang Legend"	
2019	"Starlela"	
2019	"Eh"	
2021	"Tentu"	
2022	"Pijak"	

== Achievements ==
Year	Award	Category	Nominated work	Results
2020	35th Song Champion Awards	Best Performance	"Eh"	Won

== Controversy ==
Contract breach issue
In October 2021, Zizi Kirana's name was hotly debated when the director and producer of the drama Jamu Nesan, Dato' Rafiena Ezanee Ramli, claimed that Zizi had breached the contract by wearing a hijab before the filming process of the drama was completed. The drastic action taken by Zizi Kirana made Dato' Rafiena claim that she had suffered losses and she was forced to drop Zizi's name as the main actress of the drama and replace her with Didi Astillah. However, Zizi later came forward to explain that she had asked for the views and opinions of the mufti regarding the ruling on wearing a wig to make the character successful and the mufti had explained that it was haram even if it was done on a work basis. This was because Dato' Rafiena had previously suggested that Zizi wear a wig to make the character as a mafia leader successful and at the same time wanted to complete the filming process of the drama.

However, Dato' Rafiena once again came forward to explain that she would sue Zizi Kirana due to Zizi's delay in responding to her previously on whether she wanted to continue filming or not. However, Zizi Kirana appealed for Dato' Rafiena not to sue her and to understand her situation now that she is wearing a hijab.
