= Cik Manggis =

- چئ مڠڬیس
- Born: Nurshazwani binti Shamsuddin; 2 September 1989 (age 37); Kuala Lumpur, Malaysia
- Other name: "Cik Manggis De Fam"
- Education: Creative and Artistic Technology, Sail Art
- Alma mater: Mara University of Technology (UiTM), Puncak Perdana
- Occupations: Singer; Actress; Host Television
- Years active: 2015–present
- Musical career
- Genres: DJ, R&B
- Instrument: Vocal

Nurshazwani Shamsuddin (born 2 September 1989) or better known as Cik Manggis or Manggis "De Fam" is a Malaysian singer, actress and host. She is best known as a member of the group De Fam where she is the oldest member of the group, which also includes Sophia Liana and Azira Shafinaz. Apart from singing, Cik Manggis is also an actress and once hosted an Astro program with her group.

== Early life ==
Nurshazwani Shamsuddin, born on 2 September 1989 in Kuala Lumpur, is the second of three siblings.

Cik Manggis is the daughter of Zurah II drummer Shamsuddin Idris (Sam) and married former Kuala Lumpur FA footballer Syazmin Firdaus Aminuddin on 18 October 2014.

== Career ==
Cik Manggis through the group De Fam has been nominated in two categories 22nd Music Industry Awards (AIM22) through Best New Artist and Best Group Vocal Performance in a Song.

=== Acting field ===
Before starting her career with De Fam, Cik Manggis first made a name for herself as an actress.

Cik Manggis's first drama was a drama produced by Zeel Production in collaboration with Ika Nabila. Most of the dramas that Cik Manggis acts in are produced by Zeel Production, to the point that some fans consider her to be the "golden child" of the production.

After several times acting in supporting roles, Cik Manggis was entrusted by Datuk Yusry Abdul Halim to play the main role in a serial drama broadcast on Astro Warna titled Saka Sisters, paired with Sara Ali.

=== Dance ===
Cik Manggis's dream of having her own dance class came true when she was entrusted by the 2Twenty2 dance studio to run a choreography class specifically for women every Saturday.

== Discography ==
Here are the singles with De Fam.

- "#Supergirls" (2015)
- "With You" (2016)
- "Bila Ada Kamu" (2017)
- "Panas" (2019)
- "Berubah" (2022)
- "Mula" (2024)
- "Alamak Raya Lagi" (2024)
- "Anak Raja" (2025)

== Filmography ==
=== Drama ===
Year	Title	Character	TV channels	Note
2015	B.I.B.	Ezzaura	Unifi TV	The first drama
2015	Eksperimen Cinta	Tengku Amelisha	TV3	
2017	Jejak Karmila	Syarifah Aniza (teenager)	TV3	
2017	Kisah Dari Mekah	Dare	Astro Oasis	Episode: "Door No.9"
2017	Kisah Dari Mekah	Sara	Astro Oasis	Episode: "My Repentance Is Dirty"
2017	Kisah Dari Mekah	Mila	Astro Oasis	Episode: "Invitation to Umrah by Izrail"
2017	Saka Sisters	Suri	Astro Warna	
2018	Papa Nak Menantu	Fatimah/Tim	TV3	
2018	Vila Ghazara	Mastura	TV3	
2018	Klik! Pengantin Musim Salju	Nana	Astro Ria	
2018	Alamatnya Cinta	Emma	Astro Ria	
2021	Kita Regu	Cempaka	Astro Arena	
2022	Beriani Gam Kak Asparela	Ukisya	Astro Ria	
2022	The Pak Mat Clan	Alissa	TV3	

=== Telefilm ===
Year	Title	Character	TV Channel	Notes
2015	Dalam Perlukan Ramadan	Saliza	Astro Ria	First telefilm
2017	Pintu No.9 Masjid Nabawi	Wani	Astro Citra	
2021	Bayang	Lisa	Astro Citra	

=== Television ===
Year	Title	As	TV Channel	Notes
2016	Kelab Komedi	Guest Artist	TV9	
2016	Dangdut Star	Host	Astro Prima	with Sophia Liana, Azira Shafinaz & Tauke Jambu
2016	Bonda Bonding	Guest Artist	Astro Prima	with Azira Shafinaz
2017	Temasya Sukan Kelaut	Guest Artist	Astro Warna	
2017	Perang Jantina	Guest Artist	Astro Ria	
2017	Jalan Makan Tido	Guest Artist	Astro Ria	
2017	CCTV	Guest Artist	Astro Ria	To promote the drama Saka Sisters
2018	Wanita Hari Ini	Guest Artist	TV3	Topic: Is it necessary to know about the past of a couple?
2018	Resepi Memikar Isteri	Guest Artist	Astro Ria	with his partner, Syazmin Firdaus
2018	Pop Rumble	Participants	NTV7	
2018	CCTV	Guest Artist	Astro Ria	Invited 2 times in 2018 The first time to promote the drama Klik! Pengantin Musim Salju the second time to promote the drama Alamatnya Cinta
2018	MeleTOP	Guest Artist	Astro Ria	Promotion of the drama Alamatnya Cinta with Hisyam Hamid and Alicia Amin
2018	Bawang Live	Guest Artist	Astro Ria	With the actors of Alamatnya Cinta
2019	Rasa Anak Emak, Anak Bapak	Himself	Astro Prima	With his father Shamsuddin Idris (drummer of The Zurah II).
2021	Teroka Lokal	Guest Artist	Naura HD	
2021	Sepahtu Reunion Live 2021	Atia	Astro Warna	Guest Artist: Episode "Mengharapkan Pagar"
2024	The Hardest Singing Show	Participants	Astro Ria	De Fam Group
