= Fad Bocey =

Malaysian comedian, actor, host and radio presenter (born 1991)

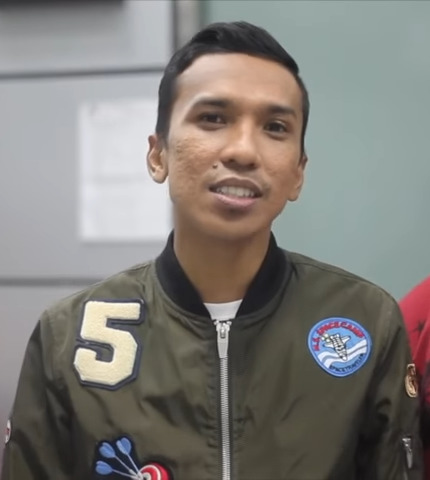
- Born: Muhammad Fadzlie bin Mohd Nizam; 1 February 1991 (age 35); Tampoi, Johor Bahru, Johor, Malaysia
- Other name: Fad Bocey
- Occupations: Comedian; Actor; Host Television; Radio presenter
- Years active: 2012–present
- Employers: Astro Radio (2016-19); Media Prima Audio (2021-23)
- Spouse: Nur Syahirah A. Rahman (m. 2015)
- Children: 5
- Parent(s): Mohd Nizam Mohd Khalid; Mutiara Mohammed
- Relatives: Faridzul Mohd Nizam (brother)

Comedy career
- Medium: Television, film
- Genres: Comedy, sketch
- Members: Bocey

Muhammad Fadzlie Mohd Nizam or better known as Fad Bocey (born 13 February 1991) is a Malaysian comedian, actor, host and radio presenter. He is a member of the group Bocey with Achey and Abam. He is also a former participant in the first season of the reality TV show Bintang Mencari Bintang published by TV3.

== Personal life ==
Fad married Nur Syahirah A. Rahman in 2015, they were blessed with 5 children.

== Filmography ==
=== Films ===
Year	Title	Character	Notes
2013	Hantu Tok Mudim		First film, additional actor
2014	Kawan Aku Mati Dalam Rumah Sewa	Remy	
2014	Suatu Malam Kubur Berasama 2	Man Auto	
2016	Warna Cinta Impian	Ashraf	
2016	Zack Kapcai	Zack	
2025	Martabat: Misi Berdarah	Iedil	
2025	Impak Maksima 2	Naim	

=== Telefilm ===
Year	Title	Character	TV Channel
2014	Samba Bola Kampung	Malim	Astro Prima
2014	Homestay Berhantu	Din	TV9
2014	Bocey Beraya	Fad	Astro Warna
2015	Salah Susuk Raya	Akmal	Astro Prima
2016	Bocey Mencecey	Fad	Astro Warna
2018	Tiga Bahadol	Malim	Astro Warna
2023	Raya Heist	Agus	Watch

=== Television ===
Year	Title	Role	TV Channel	Notes
2014	Betul Ke Bohong? (Season 5 Special)	Guest Artist	Astro Warna	Episode 1&2
2015	Betul Ke Bohong? (Season 7)	Guest Artist	Astro Warna	Episode 6
2015	Sembang Pacak	Guest Artist	Astro Warna	
2015	Buana Oh Buana	Various characters	Astro Warna	
2016	Trek Selebriti	Guest Artist	Astro Ria	
2016	Lawak Komedi	Co-host Johan Raja Lawak	Astro Warna	
2016	Bocey & Friends	Various characters	Astro Warna	
2018	Bocey & Friends Live	Various characters	Astro Warna	
2018	Gegar Lawak	Co-host Kamal Adli	Astro Warna	
2021	Layan Karok	Co-host Mark Adam and Shuk Sahar	Awesome TV	
2023–present	Ubi Superstar Live	Various characters	Astro Warna	
2023	MeleTOP	Guest Host	Astro Ria	
2023	Hiburan Minggu Ini	Host	TV2	

=== Participants ===
Year	Title	Group
2012	Raja Lawak Season 6	Selak
2013	Bintang Mencari Bintang (Season 1)	Bocik
2013	Maharaja Lawak Mega 2013	Bocey
2014	Super Spontan 2014	Mawas Berduri
2014	Maharaja Lawak Mega 2014	Bocey
2015	Juara Parodi	Right handed
2016	Maharaja Lawak Mega 2016	Bocey
2016	Super Spontan Superstar	Hipster Tiger
2017	Maharaja Lawak Mega 2017	Bocey
2017	Super Spontan Superstar 2017	King Weasel
2018	Super Spontan Xtravaganza	Lobster Leler
2018	Maharaja Lawak Mega 2018	Bocey
2019	Muzikal Lawak Superstar (season 1)	UNI
2019	Maharaja Lawak Mega 2019	Bocey
2020	Muzikal Lawak Superstar (season 2)	UNI
2021	Maharaja Lawak Mega 2021	Boro
2021	Gema Lawak Superstar	UNI
2022	Muzikal Lawak Superstar (season 3)	TUBI
2024	Muzikal Lawak Superstar (season 4)	Paddy

=== Siniar ===
Year	Title	Role	Channels	Notes
2024	Bocey Comeback	Himself	YouTube	with Achey

== Radiography ==
=== Radio ===
Year	Title	Station
2016–2019	Petang Era	Era
1 March - 30 July 2021	Jam Hot	Hot FM
2 August 2021 - 29 July 2022	Rakyat Rangers	Hot FM
1 August - 30 December 2022	Sembang Squad	Hot FM
2–6 January 2023	Hot Squad	Hot FM

== Awards and nominations ==
- Runner-up - Bintang Mencari Bintang 2013 - Bocik Group
- Third Place - Maharaja Lawak Mega 2013 - Bocey Group
- Fifth Place - Maharaja Lawak Mega 2014 - Bocey Group
- Fifth Place - Juara Parodi 2015 - Righthanded Group
- Champion - Maharaja Lawak Mega 2016 - Bocey Group
- Fourth Place - Super Spontan Superstar 2016
- Champion - Maharaja Lawak Mega 2017 - Bocey Group
- Runner-up - Super Spontan Superstar 2017
- Champion - Super Spontan Xtravaganza 2018
- Runner-up - Maharaja Lawak Mega 2018 - Bocey Group
- Third Place - Maharaja Lawak Mega 2019 - Bocey Group
- Runner-up - Muzikal Lawak Superstar (2019) - UNI Group
- Runner-up - Muzikal Lawak Superstar 2 (2020) - UNI Group
- Third Place - Maharaja Lawak Mega 2021 - Boro Group
- Champion - Muzikal Lawak Superstar 3 (2022) - UBI Group
- Runner-up -Muzikal Lawak Superstar 4 2024 - Padie Group

Year	Award	Category	Nomination	Results
2018	31st Daily News Popular Star Awards	Popular Comedy Artist	—N/a	Nominated
