= Haniff Hamzah =

Malaysian radio presenter (born 1984)

- Born: Haniff bin Hamzah; 19 October 1984 (age 41); Federation of Malaya (now Malaysia)
- Occupations: Radio Presenter; Host Television
- Years active: 2004–present
- Employers: Astro Audio (2008-2024); Media Prima Audio (2024-2026)
- Spouse: Wan Nor Katherin (m. 2010)
- Children: Tuah Kaliff; Jebat Kaliff
- Parents: Late Hamzah Hassan (father); Rosnah Mohd Zain (mother)
- Family: Hisham Hamzah

Haniff Hamzah (born 19 October 1984) is a Malaysian radio presenter and host.

== Career ==
Haniff is best known as a radio presenter starting his career on XFresh FM (later known as XFM) in 2008, before moving to Era from 2010 to 2024. In 2024 he went to the English language Fly FM to present the breakfast show with Ean Nasrun. In March 2026, he announced his departure from Fly FM, and moved to Hot FM.

Haniff has hosted a number of television shows. He also worked as a voice dubbing actor for films.

== Personal life ==
Haniff married Wan Nor Katherina in 2010. They have two children.

== Filmography ==
=== Movies ===
Year	Title	Role	Note	Ref.
2012	The Smurfs	Henry	Voice dubbing in Malay	
2013	Madagascar 3: Europe's Most Wanted	Comandante	Voice dubbing in Malay	
2013	Planes	Dusty Crophopper	Voice dubbing in Malay	
2014	Despicable Me 2	Silas Ramsbottom	Voice dubbing in Malay	
2015	Transformers: Age of Extinction	Ratchet	Voice dubbing in Malay	
2018	Lee Chong Wei: Rise of the Legend	The audience	Special Appearances	

=== Television ===
Year	Title	Role	TV Channel	Notes
2012	Betul Ke Bohong? (Season 2)	Guest Artist	Astro Warna	Episode 3
2013	Betul Ke Bohong? (Season 3)	Guest Artist	Astro Warna	Episode 4
2013	Frust Gila	Host	Astro Warna	hosted with Ray Dapdap
2013	Super Spontan 2013	Host	Astro Warna	hosted with Ray Dapdap
2013	Betul Ke Bohong? (Season 4)	Guest Artist	Astro Warna	Episode 13 (Final)
2014	Betul Ke Bohong? (Season 5)	Guest Artist	Astro Warna	Episode 11 (Quarter Final)
2014	Super Spontan 2014	Host	Astro Warna	co-host
2014–2022	MeleTOP Era Awards	Guest host	Astro Ria	
2015	Betul Ke Bohong? (Season 6)	assistant captain Achey Bocey	Astro Warna	Group Leader Ray Dapdap & Angah Raja Lawak
2015	Betul Ke Bohong? (Season 7)	assistant captain Achey Bocey	Astro Warna	Group Leader Ray Dapdap & Angah Raja Lawak
2015	Super Spontan All Stars	Jury	Astro Warna	jury with Dato' Afdlin Shauki
2015	Betul Ke Bohong? (Season 8)	Couples	Astro Warna	Episode 1
2021	All Together Now Malaysia (season 1)	Jury	Astro Ria	
2021	34th Daily News Popular Star Award	Popular Radio Presenter	TV3	
2022	Anugerah Industri Muzik	Presenter	Astro Ria	
2024	36th Daily News Popular Star Award	Host	TV3	with Didie Alias & Riena Diana
2024–2025	Calips Soda One in a Million (Season 4)	Host	TV3	with Fiza Frizzy

=== Radio ===
Year	Title	Station
2008 – May 2010	"Morning People X"	X FM
June 2010 – 2 July 2024	Riuh Pagi Era, JoHaRa Pagi Era, 101 Era & Evening Era	Era
5 August 2024 – 27 March 2026	EH! It's Ean & Haniff on the Fly Breakfast	Fly FM
4 May 2026	Hot Vibe Club	Hot FM
