= Radin (disambiguation) =

Radin is a surname.

Radin may also refer to:

- Radin, Yiddish name of Radun, Belarus
- Radin Yeshiva
- Radin!, French film

== Given name ==
- Gost Radin (Radin Butković) was a gost of Bosnian Church during the 14th century in medieval Bosnia.
- Radin Amir Affendy, radio presenter and host in Malaysia.
- Radin Inten II, national hero of Indonesia
- Radin Jablanić, Bosnian nobleman,
- Radin Umar Radin Sohadi, Malaysian academic administrator

== See also ==
- Radin Mas, Singapore
