= Fakhrul Radhi =

Malaysian singer and television host

- Born: Mohd Fakhrul Radhi bin Khamarudin; April 6, 1985 (age 41); Alor Setar, Kedah, Malaysia
- Other name: Fakhrul UNIC
- Education: Bachelor's Degree in Usuluddin, Insaniah University College (KUIN), Kedah; Diploma in Tahfiz Quran and Qiraat, Insaniah University College (KUIN) Kedah
- Occupations: Executive director; Singer; Preacher; Television host; Qari; Al-Quran teaching staff
- Years active: 2008–present
- Employer: UNIC DotMy Pro Sdn. Bhd.
- Known for: group UNIC; The champion of the Al-Quran Academy third season competition.
- Spouse: Syahirah Sohimi
- Children: 2

Mohd Fakhrul Radhi bin Khamarudin', affectionately called Fakhrul (born 6 April 1985 in Alor Setar, Kedah), is a member of UNIC who was new in 2008 and made his first appearance in UNIC's last album under the label Hijjaz Records which was the album Langkah Tercipta in 2009. Apart from singing, he is also active in preaching and has been a motivational expert. He is currently hosting the show Bismillah Ad-Duha with PU Amin, Yana Samsudin and Diana Amir besides teaching the Quran as a sideline. He is also the champion of the third season of the Akademi Al-Quran competition and most recently he and the UNIC group won the first season of the Gema Gegar Vaganza competition.

== Personal life ==
He has married Syahirah Sohimi and has two children.

== Filmography ==
=== Drama ===
Year	Title	Character	TV Channel	Notes
2024	Budak Bedak The Series		Astro Gempak	

=== Television ===
Year	Title	As	TV Channel	Notes
2014-2017, 2024-present	Nasi Lemak Kopi O	Host	TV9	
2017-present	Tazkirah Malam Jumaat	Host	Astro Oasis	
2017-2018	Bismillah Ad-Duha	Host	Astro Oasis	with PU Amin, Yana Samsudin & Diana Amir
2018	Gema Gegar Vaganza (season 2)	Host	Astro Oasis	with Fikry Ibrahim & Siti Nordiana
2020–present	Geng Ngaji	Host	Astro Oasis	
2021–present	Salam Baitullah	Host	TV1 & Berita RTM	
2023	Akademi Qurra’’ (season 1)	Host	TV Alhijrah	
2023	Rancangan Khas MeleTOP	Host	Astro Ria	with Dato' AC Mizal, Elly Mazlein, Hawa Rizwana & Nabil Ahmad
