= Achey Bocey =

Malaysian male comedian, actress, singer and host (born 1986)

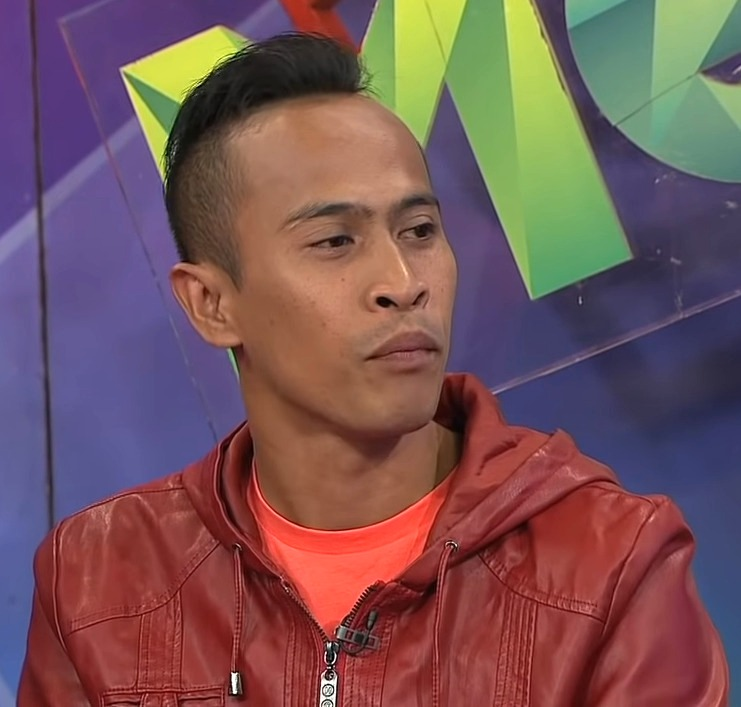
- Born: Mohd Nasir bin Hamzah; 17 August 1986 (age 39); Segamat, Johor, Malaysia
- Occupations: Comedian; Actor; Singer; Host Television
- Years active: 2012–present
- Spouse: Nur Hassanah "Anne" Yahya
- Children: 1
- Parents: Hamzah bin Salam (father); Ngaisah binti Hassan (mother)
- Family: Natasha Hamzah (sister)

Comedy career
- Medium: Television, film
- Genres: Comedy, sketch

Mohd Nasir Hamzah or better known as Achey Bocey (born 17 August 1986) is a Malaysian comedian, actor, singer and television host. He was the winner of the first season of Bintang Mencari Bintang broadcast on TV3 and one of the members of the Bocey group with Abam and Fad.

== Career ==
He became the champion of the first season of Bintang Mencari Bintang in 2013 organized by TV3. He successfully beat the Bocik, Titan and Tapaw groups to emerge as the champion. He also hosted the Kintang Kintung program on TV3 with his teacher, the late Harun Salim Bachik. In November, he joined the Bocik group and was given the name Bocey to participate in the Maharaja Lawak Mega 2013. It turned out that their participation was not in vain when they got 3rd place after the Sepahtu group emerged as the champion and the Shiro group as the runner-up. In the next season of Maharaja Lawak Mega 2014 they came in 5th place. And the next two editions, they won the title of champion in 2016 and 2017. In addition to his abilities in the field of comedy and acting, Achey is also capable of creating and writing songs and singing. He released his first single, Yang Terindah, at the end of October 2017. This song is specially dedicated to his wife, Anne.

== Personal life ==
Achey is married to Nur Hassanah Yahya and has a daughter, Nur Tiara Zinnirah. He is the older brother of actress Natasha Hamzah.

He is a fan of Seniman Agung P. Ramlee.

== Filmography ==
=== Films ===
Year	Title	Character	Notes
2014	Kawan Aku Mati Dalam Rumah Sewa	Rudy	First film
2017	Abang Long Fadil 2	Ali	
2018	Hantu Wangan	Kintang Kintung	
2019	Tiada Tajuk	Narrator/Wak Calit	
2020	Kelaster	Zul	
2021	Mat Bond Malaya	Agent 10	Special appearance
2021	Frontliner	Captain Nasir	
2023	Sue-On	Pocong	
2023	Mat Tudung Begins	Sabri / Sabrina	
2024	Baik Punya Ah Long	Uncle Miss	

=== Drama ===
Year	Title	Character	TV channels	Note
2013	"Kingtang Kintung"		TV3	The first drama
2015	Oh My English! Class Of 2015	Sir John	Astro TVIQ	Episode: "Zero To Hero"
2015	Tanah Kubur (Season 14)	Salim	Astro Oasis	Episode: "Viral Fitnah"
2017	Tuyul Ke London	Achey	Astro Warna	
2020	Salam Squad 2.0	Council Officer	Astro Ceria	
2020–2021	Tok Kata	Penghulu	Awesome TV	

=== Telefilm ===
Year	Title	Character	TV Channel	Notes
2014	Haunted Homestay	Achik	TV9	First telefilm
2014	Samba Bola Kampung	Azam	Astro Prima	
2014	Bocey Beraya	Achey	Astro Warna	
2014	Qish Qish Qish		Astro Ceria	
2015	Salah Susuk Raya	Wak Eng	Astro Prima	
2016	Bocey Mencecey	Achey	Astro Warna	
2018	Tiga Bahadol	Karim	Astro Warna	

=== Television ===
Year	Title	Role	TV Channel	Notes
2014	Betul Ke Bohong? (Season 5)	Guest Artist	Astro Warna	Episodes 1&2
2015	Betul Ke Bohong? (Season 6)	Haniff Group	Astro Warna	Assistant Captain
2015	Betul Ke Bohong? (Season 7)	Haniff Group	Astro Warna	Assistant Captain
2015	Buana Oh Buana	Various Characters	Astro Warna	
2016	Bocey & Friends	Various Characters	Astro Warna	
2018	Bocey & Friends Live	Various Characters	Astro Warna	
2019	Di Sebalik Tawa (Season 2)	Themselves	Astro Warna	
2020	Oops Terkena (Episode 1)	Themselves	Awesome TV	
2022	Akustika Ramadan 2022	Co-host Anas Ridzuan	TV3	

=== Participants ===
Year	Title	Group
2013	Bintang Mencari Bintang	Solo
2013	Maharaja Lawak Mega 2013	Bocey
2014	Super Spontan 2014	Biawak Lazer
2014	Maharaja Lawak Mega 2014	Bocey
2015	Super Spontan All Stars	Silat Dongibab
2015	Juara Parodi	Black dot Chey
2016	Maharaja Lawak Mega 2016	Bocey
2016	Super Spontan Superstar 2016	Monyet Mafia
2017	Super Spontan Superstar 2017	Tenggiling Taiko
2017	Maharaja Lawak Mega 2017	Bocey
2018	Super Spontan Xtravaganza	Sotong Kangkung
2018	Maharaja Lawak Mega 2018	Bocey
2019	Muzikal Lawak Superstar (season 1)	Botak
2019	Maharaja Lawak Mega 2019	Bocey
2020	Muzikal Lawak Superstar (season 2)	Mashuk
2021	Maharaja Lawak Mega 2021	Boro
2021	Gema Lawak Superstar	3A
2022	Muzikal Lawak Superstar (season 3)	Chili

=== Siniar ===
Year	Title	Role	Channels	Note
2024–present	"Bocey Comeback"	Himself and Host	YouTube	Co-host with Fad

== Discography ==
=== Single ===
Year	Title	Top Rank			
Year	Title	RIM	ERA FM	HOT FM	Music Music
2017	Yang Terindah	5	1		11
2018	Anak				
2019	Sakit				
2020	Kita Baik Ramai Sayang (with Fad)				
2021	Sembuh				
2022	Cintaku Takkan Hilang				
2023	Raya Rempit				
2024	Kabus (with Baby Feyaaa)				
2024	Kueh Raya				
2024	Biar (with Tantari)				

== Awards and nominations ==
- Champion - Bintang Mencari Bintang
- 3rd Place - Maharaja Lawak Mega 2013 - Bocey Group
- 4th Place - Super Spontan 2014
- 5th Place - Maharaja Lawak Mega 2014 - Bocey Group
- 3rd Place - Super Spontan 2015
- Champion - Maharaja Lawak Mega 2016 - Bocey Group
- 3rd Place - Super Spontan 2016
- Champion - Maharaja Lawak Mega 2017 - Bocey Group
- 3rd Place - Super Spontan 2017
- 3rd Place - Super Spontan 2018
- Runner-up - Maharaja Lawak Mega 2018 - Bocey Group
- 4th Place - Muzikal Lawak Superstar (Season 1) - Botak Group
- 3rd Place - Maharaja Lawak Mega 2019 - Bocey Group
- 3rd Place - Maharaja Lawak Mega 2021 - Boro Group
- Runner-up - Muzikal Lawak Superstar (Season 3) - Cili Group

Year	Award	Category	Recipient/Nominated Work	Results
2014	27th Berita Harian Popular Star Award	Popular Male New Artist	Achey	Won
2014	2014 Color Comedy Awards	Most Popular Male Comedian	Achey	Nominated
2015	28th Daily News Popular Star Award	Popular Male Comedian	Achey	Nominated
2018	31st Daily News Popular Star Award	Popular TV Host	Achey	Nominated
2018	31st Daily News Popular Star Award	Popular Versatile Artist	Achey	Nominated
2018	31st Daily News Popular Star Award	Popular Comedian Artist	Achey	Nominated
2023	35th Daily News Popular Star Award	Popular Male Singer	Achey	Nominated
