= Radin Amir Affendy =

Malaysian radio presenter (born 1990)

- Born: Radin Amir Affendy bin Ahmad Aruani; 15 March 1990 (age 36); Perak, Malaysia
- Education: Ijazah Sarjana Muda Pemasaran
- Alma mater: UiTM
- Occupations: Radio Presenter; Host Television; Actor
- Years active: 2014–present
- Employer: Astro Radio (2014-present)
- Partner: Mira @ Nur Amirah Shamsulbahrin
- Father: Ahmad Aruani

Radin Amir Affendy bin Ahmad Aruani (born 15 March 1990) also known as Radin is a Malaysian radio presenter and TV host.

== Radiography ==
=== Radio ===
Year	Title	Station
2014–present	ERA D'Boyz; Evening ERA; Rancak Sabtu ERA; 3 Pagi ERA	Era

== Filmography ==
=== Movies ===
Year	Title	Character	Notes
2023	Gui	Bomoh	First film
2023	Polis EVO 3	Witness	Special appearance

=== Telefilm ===
Year	Title	Character	TV channel
2018	30 Hari Membunuh Cinta	Calon Temu Duga	Astro Citra

=== Television ===
Year	Title	As	TV Channel	Notes
2019	Mingguan Wanita	Host	Astro Prima	
2020	Rasa Nostalgia Ramadan	Guest Artist	Astro Prima	with Falyq Hikyle
2021	Media Hiburan Throwback	Host	Astro Prima	
2023	Gempak Most Wanted Awards 2022	Host	Astro Prima	with Elly Mazlein, Amelia Henderson & Sean Lee

=== Siniar ===
Year	Title	Role	Notes
2024	Studio Sembang	Guest Artist	with Amelia Henderson
2024-2025	Raja Lawak Podcast	Host	with Azad Jasmin

=== Advertisement ===
Year	Advertisement
2013	Election Commission of Malaysia

== Controversy ==
=== Religious incitement incident ===
On 4 March 2025, ERA FM aired a video clip showing the presenters of 3 Pagi Era making fun of religious rituals, especially the Kavadi dance, a sacred Hindu ceremony during Thaipusam. The video clip, which was uploaded to social media, sparked outrage from the Indian community in Malaysia. Following the incident, the video clip was deleted and all three presenters of 3 Pagi Era apologised for their insensitive behaviour towards other religions. Astro Radio has suspended the three presenters and they are being investigated by the Malaysian Communications and Multimedia Commission (MCMC) and the police. Further investigation revealed that they are actually mimicking Miki Ghazali dance and not mocking the Indian celebrations.

== Awards and nominations ==
Year	Award	Category	Recipient/Nominated work	Results
2016	30th Berita Harian Popular Star Award	Popular Radio Presenter	Radin	Won
2018	32nd Daily News Popular Star Award	Popular Radio Presenter	Radin	Nominated
