= Awesome TV =

Malaysian free-to-air terrestrial television station

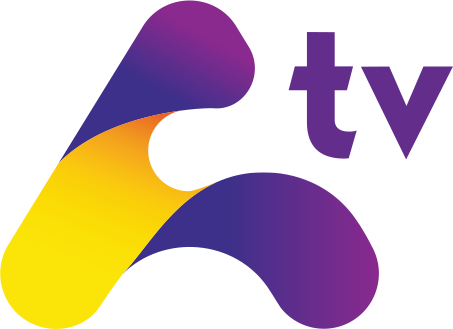
- Country: Malaysia
- Broadcast area: Malaysia; Singapore; Brunei; Thailand (South Thailand, particularly Songkhla, Narathiwat, Yala and Satun); Indonesia (North Kalimantan, West Kalimantan, East Kalimantan and Riau Islands); Philippines (particularly southern Palawan and Tawi-Tawi)
- Headquarters: MOF Inc Tower, Persiaran KLCC, Kuala Lumpur, Malaysia

Programming
- Language: Malay
- Picture format: 1080i HDTV; 576i SDTV

Ownership
- Owner: Koperasi Amanah Pelaburan Berhad (Awesome Broadcasting Sdn. Bhd.)
- Key people: Dato' Adam Ilyas (Chief Executive Officer); TS Mazlan Mahdi (Chief Operating Officer); Johan Ishak (Managing director); Datin Ezzan Zalilah Zulfadzli (Director of Content Development Unit)

History
- Launched: 3 August 2020; 5 years ago
- Closed: 1 August 2024 (Astro feed)

Links
- Website: awesometv.my

Awesome TV is a Malaysian Malay language free-to-air television channel owned by Awesome Broadcasting Sdn. Bhd. (formerly known as Awesome Media Network). The channel features first-run local original production and foreign content. Awesome TV started its trial broadcast on 28 July 2020 and full operation started on 3 August 2020.

== Overview ==
Awesome TV is a digital television channel headquartered in Malaysia and being the first to officially commence broadcasting through the usage of digital encoding only via DVB-T2 set-top box for viewers in Malaysia. Viewers could watch this channel during trial broadcasting of this channel from 28 July 2020 at 12:00 pm to 3 August 2020 when it was finally launched. At this point of time, Awesome TV does not have any main news time slot either through standalone or from other broadcast television channel.

On 7 January 2021, Awesome TV announced on their official Facebook account that the channel would broadcast on Astro starting 18 January. The channel broadcasts on channel 123 that previously occupied by Astro Ria HD following the renumbering of Astro channels on 1 April 2020.

Starting February 1, 2022, Awesome TV broadcasts its own news, Berita 7:57, the same as Buletin Utama on TV3. The prime time news program is currently broadcasting live from 33, Jalan Rakyat, Brickfields, 50470 Kuala Lumpur before it moved to Persiaran KLCC in Kuala Lumpur.

The network ceased broadcasting on Astro starting 1 August 2024 along with GEM (Unifi TV Ch 471) after just three years, as part of Awesome TV's strategic plan to become a "fully virtual platform".

== Programming ==
The channel airs original programs, news programs and other local and foreign programs.

== Controversy ==
In November 2022, Awesome TV was accused by public due its racist editorial stance after its news programme, Berita 7:57 encouraging Malay voters to vote in full force in the 15th Malaysian general election to prevent the non-Malay politicians from gaining political powers. In Twitter post, users slammed the news clip as "racist". The TV station's spokesman later issued statements that Awesome TV's news programme was alleged to be manipulated by certain parties that support the Bumiputera agendas.

In February 2023, Berita 7:57 editor manager, Mohd Ilyas Pakeer Mohamad resigned from his position following the controversy. At the same time, the Communications and Digital Minister, Fahmi Fadzil disclosed that Awesome TV has made six copyright infringement related to the fake reports. Later on, Awesome TV was called by the Malaysian Communications and Multimedia Commission (MCMC) to discuss a possible breach of news content publication after it published a news report claiming that the Malaysian government will sack over 800,000 civil servants. Awesome TV later said that it did not have any connection with Astro or other political parties and denies statements issued by politician Lokman Noor Adam, which they described it as "false and a provocation".

On February 21, MCMC opened investigation papers against Awesome TV under Section 206 of the Communications and Multimedia Act 1998 over matters pertaining to the compliance of licence conditions.

In May, Awesome TV was fined RM250,000 by the MCMC due to several offences including operating without valid licence. The licence was issued to Awesome Broadcasting but was being used by the network's parent company, Awesome Media Network.

On May 29, Communications and Digital Minister, Fahmi Fadzil asked the network to settled unpaid debts in case of lawsuits between several producers. Awesome TV, however, in its counter statement urged Fahmi not to interfered in their commercial affairs with its suppliers. Two days later, several film associations including the Film Directors Association of Malaysia (FDAM) and the Malaysian Film Producers Association (PFM) criticized Awesome TV over its rude response towards Fahmi and urged the network to issued a public apology to him, and should be responsible in resolving payment issues involving producers and artistes.

Awesome TV was excluded from the list of few companies that will take a part in the 2023 National Day celebration by the Ministry of Communications and Digital, without any reasons. The sudden decision was informed through a letter dated 23 August 2023 signed by the Ministry's Chief Secretary, Muhammad Fauzi Md Isa. Its Minister, Fahmi Fadzil explaining that the removal was due to the limited time allocation during the parade. Two other companies, Milo and Grab were also dropped.

On October 19, 2023, digital TV service provider, MYTV Broadcasting announced that it will suspend Awesome TV on its platform effective November 2 following the ongoing commercial issues related to the access fee payments. The network later cites the charged payment by MYTV as an "unfair" while claiming that it should be continued to operated on the MYTV platform until August 2025.

== Awards and accolades ==
Year	Award-giving body	Category	Recipient	Result	Ref.
2022	MCMC Star Rating Awards 2021	Best in Consumer Satisfaction for Free-to-Air Television	Awesome TV	Won	

== See also ==
- List of television stations in Malaysia
