= Astro Prima =

Malaysian TV channel

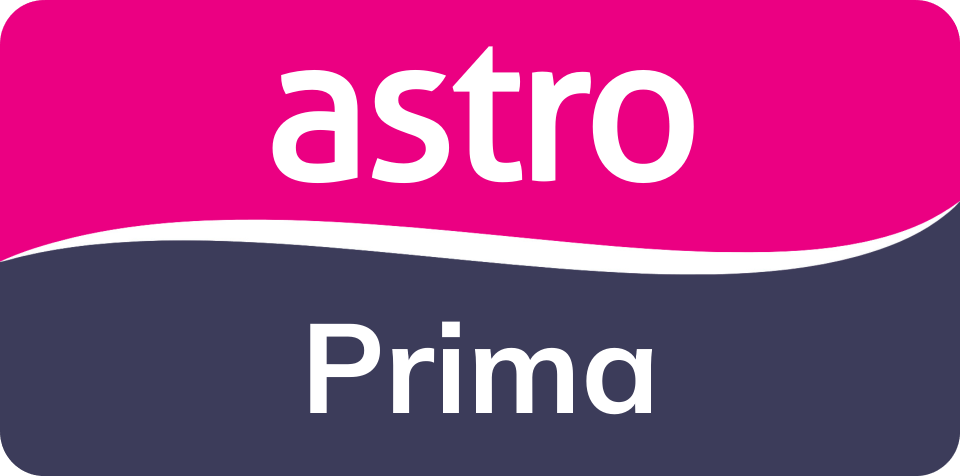
- Country: Malaysia
- Broadcast area: Malaysia
- Headquarters: Kuala Lumpur, Malaysia

Programming
- Language: Malay
- Picture format: 16:9 HDTV (1080i)

Ownership
- Owner: Astro
- Sister channels: Astro Ria; Astro Oasis; Astro Citra; Astro Rania; Astro Aura

History
- Launched: 1 January 2003; 23 years ago (SD); 14 January 2019; 7 years ago (HD)
- Founder: Ananda Krishnan
- Replaced: Astro Maya HD; Astro Warna
- Closed: 1 June 2019; 7 years ago (Singtel TV) (SD); 12 April 2021; 5 years ago (Astro) (SD); 31 March 2022; 4 years ago (Kristal-Astro) (HD)
- Former names: Prima (01.02.2003 - 28.09.2003)

Links
- Website: gempak.com

Astro Prima is a Malaysian pay television channel owned by Astro, launched on 1 January 2003. It broadcasts Malay dramas, documentaries, classic movies and comedies.

== History ==
In 2007, Astro launched a dedicated 24 hour news network called Astro Awani. This launch officially replaced the old Astro news service which used to run English news across entertainment channels like Astro Prima, allowing Prima to pivot entirely to Malay entertainment. Astro Prima is among Astro's main channel due to its viewing popularity.

Astro Prima launched its HD simulcast in 14 January 2019 with Astro Oasis.

Astro Prima is merged with Astro Warna for stronger reach on 3 December 2024, before the last program to air on the channel was an episode of Warung Sepahtu.

== Logo history ==
Astro Prima HD logo (January 14, 2019 - December 2, 2024)

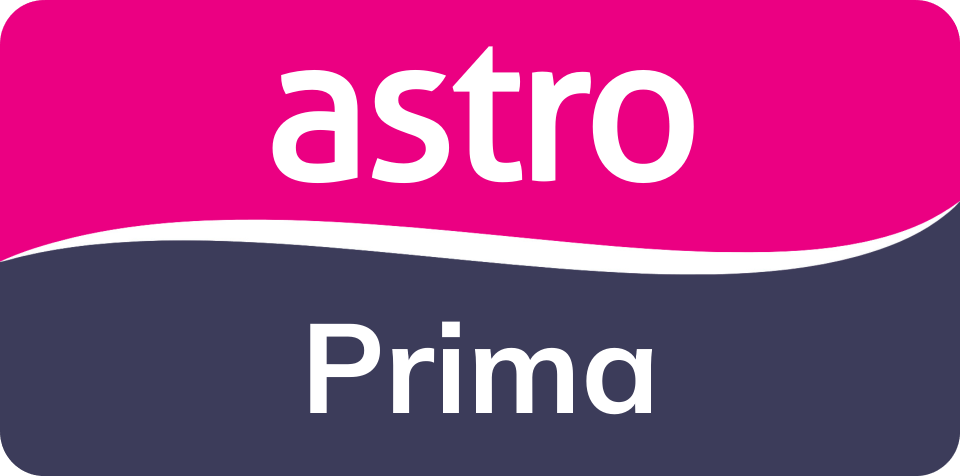
Astro Prima logo used since December 3, 2024

== Programming ==
=== Primawara Slot ===
- Jihad Iskandar
- Perempuan Dalam Pusungan
- Mira Sofea
- Duri
- Keluarga Iskandar S1
- Keluarga Iskandar S2 (moved to Astro Warna and Astro Mustika HD)
- Dia Suamiku
- Sahara
- Halimah Jongang S1
- Halimah Jongang S2
- Aiman Tempe Mania The Series
- Tok Ompek Simpang Ompek
- Nur Melinda
- Tiara
- Sufiyah
- Tanggang Ayu
- Sarafina
- Dari Cinta Jauh
- Adam Dan Hawa (also aired on Astro Maya HD, after end of the episode on Astro Mustika HD, Astro Ria and later begin on Astro Bella)
- Cinta Ibadah (also aired on Astro Maya HD)
- Sehangat Asmara
- Seludup
- Pendekar Durian Lempuk
- Impian Laili
- Jodoh Itu Milik Kita
- Bercakap Dengan Jin S1
- Bercakap Dengan Jin S2
- Kusinero Cinta

=== Tiara Slot ===
- Memori Cinta Suraya
- Lara Aishah
- Papa Ricky
- Arluna
- Semusim Rindu
- Dendam Aurora
- Syurga Yang Kedua
- Monalisa
- Berbahagi Suami

=== Teleprima Slot ===
- Antara Safa Dan Marwah
- Bukan Salah Kami
- Dari Kerana Mata
- Warkah Syurga
- DIVA
- Aku Tunggu Kau Ni
- Seteguh Hati Rabiatul Adawiyah
- Kisah Bawah Tanah

=== Reality Shows ===
- Akademi Fantasia 2014 (also aired on Astro Ria and Astro Maya HD) (first episode and grand finale only)
- Ceria Popstar 2 (also aired on Astro Ceria and Astro Maya HD) (grand finale only)
- Maharaja Lawak Mega 2011 (also aired on Astro Mustika HD and Astro Warna)
- Gegar Vaganza (also aired on Astro Ria and Astro Maya HD)
- Jeng Jeng Jeng Prankshow 2011(Astro Prima)
- Juara Johan (also aired on Astro Mustika HD) (selected episode only)
- Primadona S1
- Primadona S2
- Primadona S3
- Primadona S4 (also aired on Astro Maya HD)
- Primadona S5
- Kilauan Emas S1
- Kilauan Emas S2
- Kilauan Emas S3
- Kilauan Emas S4 (also aired on Astro Maya HD)
- Kilauan Emas S5 (also aired on Astro Maya HD)
- Sebelum Terlambat
- Motif
- Jaguh Kampung S4
- Kembara Chef Wan S2 (also aired on Astro Maya HD)
- Diari Fakir
- Terima Kasih Ibu
- Menantu vs Mentua
- Raikan Wanita
- Lesung Pipit (Also aired on Astro Maya HD)
- Anugerah Meletop Era 2015 (Also aired on Astro Maya HD and Astro Ria)
- Check In Check Out
- Tua Pun Boleh
- Pengakuan
- Raja Pantun
- Kami Prihatin

=== Ramadan Specials ===
- Primadona Ramadan Special 2014
- Hajat Ramadan Special 2014
- Dapur Chef Ammar Ramadan Special 2014
- Hajat Ramadan Special 2015
- Cik Bunga Encik Sombong

=== Hari Raya Specials ===
- Primadona Khas Syawal 2014
- Dapur Chef Ammar Khas Syawal 2014

=== Sinetrons ===
- AlKautsar
- Fitri Buah Hatiku
- Cinta Indah Musim ke 2
- Hafizah
- Dia Bukan Cinderella
- Keangunan Tuhan
- Cowok
- Putih Abu-Abu

=== Film Bollywood ===
Coming Soon 2023 " Will be broadcast every Sunday, at 2.00 pm

==== 2023 ====
- Kuch Kuch Hota Hai
- Chori Chori Chupke Chupke
- Har Dil Jo Pyar Karega
- Hum Saath Saath Hain
- Kabhi Khushi Kabhie Gham
- Mann
- Chal Mere Bhai
- Bobby
- Raju Chacha
- Dil Kya Kare
- Aa Ab Laut Chalen

== Maya HD ==
Astro Maya HD was launched on 24 June 2013 & was focused on Astro's Malay channel contents, including from Astro TVIQ & Arena, to replace Mustika HD where the channel will be only focusing on Mustika pack channels. The channel was available on channel 135 and was included in the Family Pack. On 14 January 2019, the channel split into HD simulcast channels of Astro Prima & Astro Oasis, and moved from channel 135 to channel 121 & 122.

The channel is also referred to as Maya, Maya HD, Astro Maya & 135.

== See also ==
- List of television stations in Malaysia
