= Astro Warna =

Malaysian television network

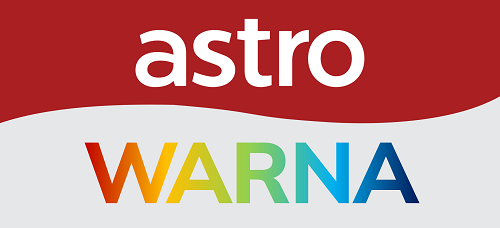
- Country: Malaysia
- Broadcast area: Malaysia

Programming
- Picture format: 16:9 HDTV (1080i)

Ownership
- Owner: Astro
- Sister channels: Astro Ria; Astro Prima; Astro Oasis; Astro Citra; Astro Premier; Astro Rania; Astro Aura

History
- Launched: 1 July 2009 (SD); 5 May 2017 (HD)
- Closed: 12 April 2021 (SD) (Astro & NJOI); 1 April 2022 (HD) (Kristal-Astro); 3 December 2024 (Malaysia Only)

Astro Warna was a 24-hour Malaysian television network in Malaysia. Launched on 1 June 2009, this channel aired local and international comedy programs. It was broadcast on the Astro satellite television platform as part of the Mustika Pack via Channel 132 (Now on Primary Pack via channel 107).

Before launching Astro Warna, all local comedy programs were shown on either Astro Ria or Astro Prima. After launching Astro Warna, almost all local comedy programs shown on their existing Malay channels moved to Astro Warna, although some programs such as Raja Lawak Astro continued to be shown on Astro Prima for its fourth and fifth season, before moving to Astro Warna in its sixth season.

Astro Warna HD was the simulcast HD version of Astro Warna. It was launched on 5 May 2017 for all Astro customers that subscribed to HD service with Mustika Pack on channel 124. Previously, their programs on HD were shown on Astro Mustika HD, leaving the latter to focus on their other two channels. Astro Mustika HD has rebranded to Astro Citra HD on 1 October 2018, but, they moved to channel 126 in this situation.

On 3 December 2024, Astro Warna ceased broadcasting and most of its programs had been moved to Astro Prima. Following its shutdown, Astro Warna along with its sister channel, Astro Premier would be operated as an online channel on Astro on Demand and Astro GO, but Astro Warna Are Still Broadcasting on Singapore Via Starhub TV after Date. However, Astro Warna's permanent shutdown received negative feedback from netizens which supported its closure, citing that "there is no any improvements for programmes aired" apart from programmes that aired repeatedly on the channel.

== Astro Warna (Singapore) ==
Astro Warna
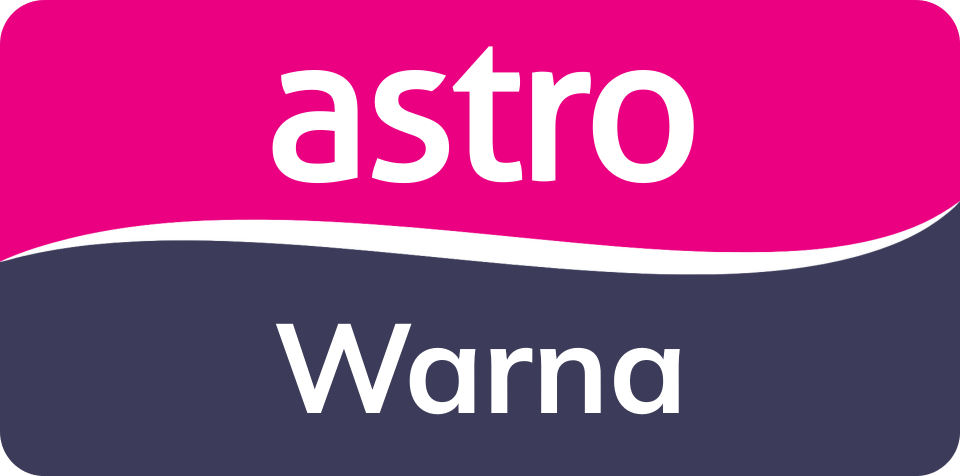
- Country: Singapore
- Broadcast area: Singapore
- Network: Starhub TV

Programming
- Picture format: 16:9 HDTV (1080i)

Ownership
- Owner: Astro
- Sister channels: Astro Sensasi

History
- Launched: 1 January 2015 (SD) (Singapore Only); 11 May 2017 (HD) (Singapore Only)

== See also ==
- Astro Citra
