= Astro Ria =

Malay language television channel

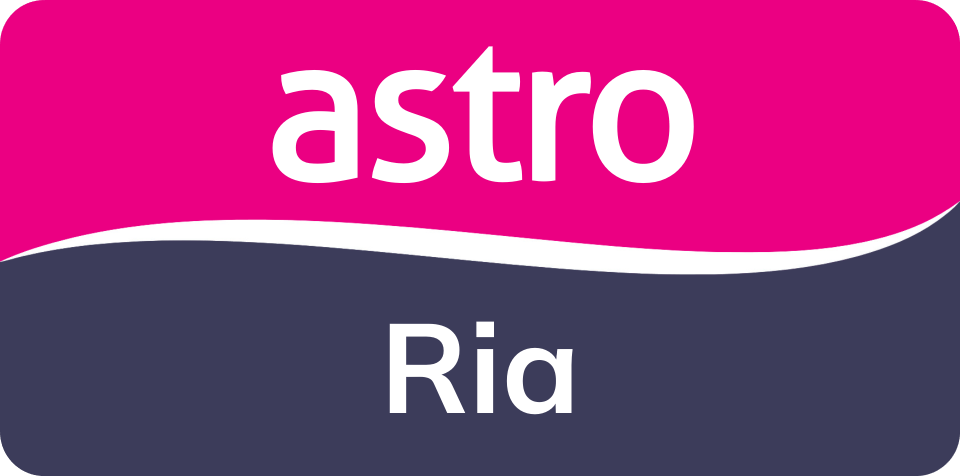
- Country: Malaysia
- Broadcast area: Malaysia; Singapore
- Headquarters: Bukit Jalil, Kuala Lumpur, Malaysia

Programming
- Language: Malay
- Picture format: 16:9 HDTV (1080i)

Ownership
- Owner: Astro
- Sister channels: Astro Prima; Astro Oasis; Astro Citra; Astro Rania; Astro Aura

History
- Launched: 1 June 1996; 30 years ago (SD); 29 May 2015; 11 years ago (HD)
- Closed: 1 June 2019; 7 years ago (Singtel TV) (SD); 12 April 2021; 5 years ago (Astro & NJOI) (SD); 31 March 2022; 4 years ago (Kristal-Astro) (HD)
- Former names: Ria (01.06.1996 - 28.09.2003)

Links
- Website: gempak.com

Astro Ria is a 24-hour Southeast Asian Malay language television channel exclusive to the Astro satellite television provider. It was one of the first 22 channels to be launched on Astro in 1996. Astro Ria offered mainly dramas & reality shows but also offered a little informational content. Its HD counterpart was launched on 29 May 2015.

== History ==
Channel changes were made from 1 October 2007, after Astro introduced a 3-digit channel. The channel is under the Astro Family package with other Malay channels like Astro Prima, Astro Oasis and channel Indonesian and Bahasa Malaysia, Astro Aruna.

In 2003, Astro Ria launched a show based from Mexican TV series La Academia, called Akademi Fantasia. The contest pits 12 singers in a bid to become the winner. The show became so popular in Malaysia and Brunei that spin-off versions were made in Indonesia and Thailand. A second season was made, which enabled Brunei viewers to vote as well. In its third season, 14 contestants instead of the original 12 were competing for the competition and the winner, Mawi became an instant music celebrity. A fourth season started in May 2006.

Astro Ria also hosts various prestigious annual events in the entertainment world such as the Era Awards broadcast, the Malaysian Film Festival, the Space Series Awards and also aired UMNO General Assembly live from the Putra World Trade Center (PWTC).

In May 2002, Astro Ria launched Bloomberg RIA News, which was essentially the Malay-language version of Bloomberg Malaysia. The news was aired at 10:45 pm on weekdays. Its first anchor was Amir Mahmood Razak, who eventually also presented for the English version. The show was produced by Amy Mahadi.

Bloomberg TV and Astro's co-operation was dissolved in 2004, and the news programming became known as Berita Astro. Berita Astro ceased production at the end of January 2007 and later launched a new news division, in which Astro Awani was launched in September 2007. Its main news program Awani 7:45 was also simulcasted on this channel every day at 7:45 pm MST. Singtel TV is currently broadcasting this channel on Channel 608 as Singtel TV has been using the 3-digit since the launch of FOX International Channels through Singtel TV.

== Logo history ==
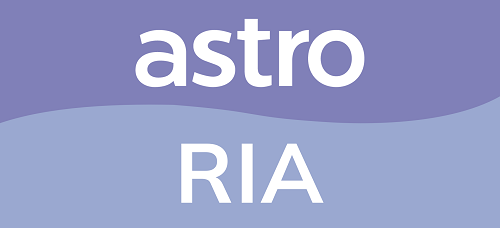
First logo of Astro Ria (29 September 2003 - 15 April 2007)

Astro Ria HD logo (29 May 2015 - 19 November 2024)

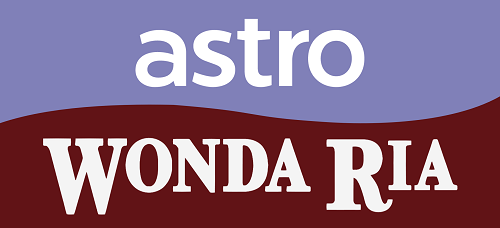
Astro Wonda Ria logo (16 - 17 September 2024)

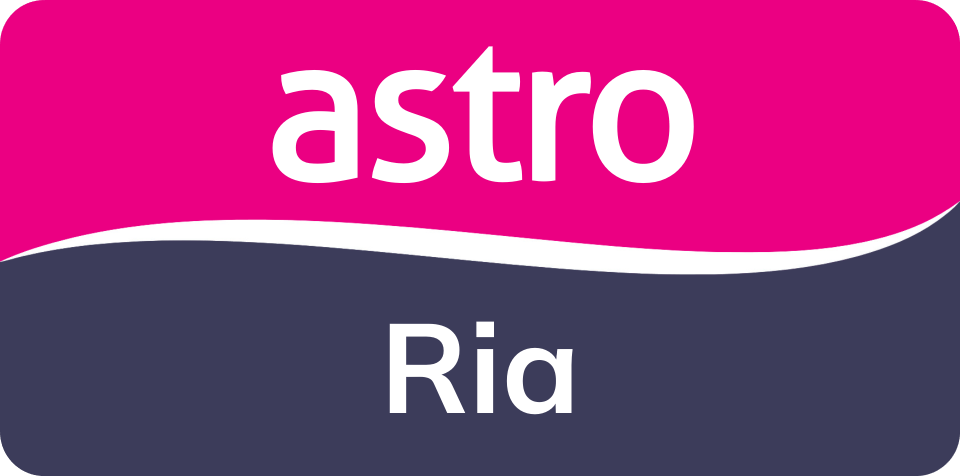
Astro Ria logo used since 20 November 2024

== See also ==
- Astro
- Astro NJOI
- Astro Prima
- Astro Citra
