= I Can See Your Voice Malaysia (Malay language) season 3 =

Television game show season

I Can See Your Voice Malaysia
- Season 3
- Starring: Yusry Abdul Halim (KRU); Mark Adam; Jihan Muse
- Hosted by: Sean Lee; Shuk Sahar
- Winners: Good singers: 12; Bad singers: 9
- No. of episodes: Regular: 20; Special: 1; Overall: 21

Release
- Original network: TV3
- Original release: Part 1: 16 February – 19 April 2020; Part 2: 21 June – 23 August 2020; Special: 31 May 2020

Season chronology
- ← Previous; Season 2 Next → Season 4

The third season of the Malaysian Malay-language television mystery music game show I Can See Your Voice Malaysia premiered on TV3 with first set of episodes on 16 February 2020, followed by a second that resumed on 21 June 2020; (Note: The 3rd season has originally scheduled to air for 10 episodes as Sufian Suhaimi played on its tentative [10th episode] finale on 19 April 2020; this was then added by 11 episodes until the formal conclusion on 23 August 2020.) also in mid-season, an Eid al-Fitr special was aired on 31 May 2020.

At the time of filming during the COVID-19 pandemic, health and safety protocols are also implemented.

== Gameplay ==
=== Format ===
According to the original South Korean rules, the guest artist must attempt to eliminate bad singers during its game phase. At the final performance, the last remaining mystery singer is revealed as either good or bad by means of a duet between them and one of the guest artists. (Note: Gameplay note: For the evidence rounds, the "hearing test" variation was used on the first part (including an Eid Al-Fitr special), while the "video clip" variation was used on the second part.)

If the last remaining mystery singer is good, they will have chance to grant a potential contract on any recording label; if a singer is bad, they win RM3,000.

=== Rounds ===
1. Visual round
  Each mystery singer is given two different identities as a good and bad singer, with one of them is a real identity.
2. Lip sync round
  The mystery singer lip syncs to the good singer's recording, then a bad singer's recording comes in the middle of the performance.
3. Evidence round
  - The hosts have randomly assigned clues about the mystery singer, and then the guest artist must choose a clue for each one.
  - The guest artist is presented with a video package featuring a "super fan" by one of the mystery singers.

== Episodes ==
=== Guest artists ===
Legend:
Good singer
Bad singer

Episode		Guest artist (Note: Players' notes: For the returning guest artists (who also include foreigners and former good singers), names are displayed in italics.; For the mixed groups, names who identified as bad singers are displayed in italics.)	Mystery singers (In their respective numbers and aliases)					
#	Date	Guest artist	Elimination order					Winner
#	Date	Guest artist	Visual round	Lip sync round		Evidence round		Winner
Part 1
1	16 February 2020	Sham Visa	6. Ahmad Izzuludin	1. Uzairi Azahar	2. Arinah Dalilah	5. Layla Sania	4. Aiman Mohd Nawi	3. Syed Noah Aljeffri
2	23 February 2020	Stacy	1. Habibah Hassan	4. Hafizul Harun	2. Aidel Ibrahim	3. Ummi Suhaila Zulkefli	5. Haziq Hakim	6. Norisma Abdulrahman
3	1 March 2020	Ismail Izzani	1. Aini Syuhada	4. Izyan Abdul Halim	3. Fikriyah Jamaludin	5. Izzuwatty Izzudin and Linda Ishak	6. Florina Azzahra	2. Yasmeen Zakaria
4	8 March 2020	Siti Nordiana	4. Ridzuan Khairuddin	2. Munarwar Azmi	3. Hayati Aqilah	6. Harris Mukhriz	5. Natasya Shafie	1. Harith Aliff
5	15 March 2020	Datuk Hattan	1. Firdaus Abdul Ghani	5. Akmal Tukiman	4. Izzrin Irfan	6. Eizlan Shah	3. Noorhidayah Hamid	2. Asya Syamimi
6	22 March 2020	Erra Fazira	5. Adli Hanafi	1. Atiqah Haslan	2. Amirul Abu Bakar	4. Fadlin Hakimi	3. Amierah Hashim	6. Wan Nurin Nadhirah
7	29 March 2020	Andi Bernadee	2. Hayatun Nisa	1. Azman Jamurah	5. Mirza Azfar Mohd Azmi	4. Hani Suraya Shariffudin	6. Shahmeer Nashrul	3. Nasir Aris
8	5 April 2020	MK (K-Clique)	3. Farah Mohd Faizal	1. Farah Razali	4. Aiman Azizul Anuar	6. Amirul Ariffi Hamzah	5. Fadhil Ariff	2. Firas Aliyan Fazli
9	12 April 2020	Shila Amzah	2. Adib Aiman Azhari	4. Farah Fadzleen and Nur Diyanah Nasir	6. Wan Irfan Husaimi	1. Nurul Sulfiana Shafie	3. Syailman Daniel	5. Clinton Jerome Chua (Note: Season highlight: Good singer Clinton Jerome Chua (ep. 9) also returned on his 2nd game, when he last performed for its Mandarin-language 2nd season.)
10	19 April 2020	Sufian Suhaimi	4. Danial Chuer	2. Tuan Mohd Syafiq	3. Nurulmaduha Mansor	6. Qutaibah Abdulaziz	5. Zhafri Mohd Shah	1. Akmal Izzat Hamdan
Special	31 May 2020	Ramlah Ram	1. Khairul Adha Wahab	6. Alya Batrisya Hairunezam	2. Hasila Wahab	4. Noorfilzah Sidek	5. Ali Awang Ladi	3. Ahmad Syamim
Part 2
11	21 June 2020	Naim Daniel	1. Amirul Hakimi	3. Raziq Sabri	5. Shyukur Ashrey	6. Shaszdan Amdshar	2. Arif Aiman	4. Aiman Ridzwan Norazmi
12	28 June 2020	Zizi Kirana	6. Wafa Amira Hisamusin	4. Izzati Azman	1. Aiman Zain	3. Zulhusmi Sulaiman	2. Zulaikha Baharom	5. Zainul Rizman Sabbas
13	5 July 2020	Neeta Manishaa (IamNEETA)	6. Aliya Syuhadah Mazlan	2. Salihin Kirawan Zeiswar	3. Aufahanie Mokhtar and Nidza Afham Mokhtar	1. Allysha Sabrina Sabri	4. Amierah Hazimah	5. Murni Kaseh Rahim
14	12 July 2020	Ara Johari	5. Zulfitri Jefri	1. Zarif Iman Zaudin	6. Ajlaa Maira Hilme	4. Danish Iman	2. Natasha Zeilaini	3. Saddam Jamhori
15	19 July 2020	Ronnie Hussein	3. Firdaus Mat Lani	2. Hafizzatulaila Fauzi	5. Haikal Fitri Azizi	6. Asral Wali Hassan	1. Amira Fauzi	4. Misha Nabilla Azlan
16	26 July 2020	Amy Mastura	1. Xavier Austin Hong	5. Umi Nizan Awane	3. Izlin Xantia Rohaizad	6. Syafiq Farhan Omar	2. Kashmeran Vajoo	4. Fakhrussyakirin Rosli
17	2 August 2020	Akim Ahmad	2. Hazzroul Ashryaf Hasri	6. Amirul Shafiq	1. Nurathirah Zahazrudin	5. Hashimah Mohammad	3. Azzaharah Wardina	4. Zulfeka Nasrun
18	9 August 2020	Marsha Milan	4. Yuzer Syafren Yazid	2. Liyana Yusri	1. Safina Sharmine Jamal	5. Alif Hafizuddin	3. Afdhal Thuairi	6. Ashimah Rahman
19	16 August 2020	Noraniza Idris	1. Amalina Suhaimi	6. Izzuddin Baharudin	2. Farhana Abdullah	4. Khairul Anuar Rashid	3. Yamin Bharom	5. Sayuti Abdul Kahar
20	23 August 2020	Nashrudin Elias (Lefthanded)	2. Arif Ismail Shamsuri	3. Syafiq Mohamad	4. Assyifa Badayamin	1. Shahirah Kamal	6. Ijlal Afiq Hairul	5. Faiz Hazni

=== Panelists ===
Legend:
Regular panelist
Guest panelist

Apps		Panelists in attendance (Sorted by first appearance, with episode designations)
g#	p#	Panelists in attendance (Sorted by first appearance, with episode designations)
21	3	Yusuf Abdul Halim (KRU), Mark Adam, and Jihan Muse (1–20; sp. 1)
1	49	Ropie Cecupak and Mira Filzah (1); Kamal Adli and Reen Rahim (2); Michael Ang and Nafiz Muaz (3); Nabila Huda and Azad Jasmin (4); Rozita Che Wan and Aliff Syukri (5); Kamal Adli, Yusuf Bahrin, and Eira Syazira (6); Aprena Manrose and Rosyam Nor (7); Ben Ladin, Zizan Razak, and Ramona Zamzam (8); Nadiya Nisaa and Zara Zya (9); Jasmine Suraya Chin and Fizz Fairuz (10); Scha Alyahya and Awal Ashaari (sp. 1); Fara Fauzana and Ungku Hariz (11); Ungku Ismail Aziz and Siti Saleha (12); Balkisyh Khan and Fizo Omar (13); Naqiu Boboy, Fad Bocey, and Shiha Zikir (14); Ayie Elham (Floor 88) and Eirma Fatima (15); Adzrin Amiruddin, Amyza Aznan, and Maya Karin (16); Ariff Bahran, Afifah Nasir, and Azhan Rani (17); Adam Lee, Sarah Suhairi, and Sweet Qismina (18); Atu Zero, Achey Bocey, and Lisa Surihani (19); Siti Sarah and Shuib Sepahtu (20)

== Online Singing Contest ==
Also in this season, two separate singing contests were held as a virtual event, in which one of the winning good singers would grant an exclusive contract and a single on any record label, to be determined through judging criteria (consisting of 60% by jury and 40% by public votes via Xtra website).

Legend:
Winner

I Can See Your Voice Malaysia season 3 — Online Concert performances
Performer(s)	Song(s)
First batch
Syed Noah Aljeffri	"Immortal" (Terabadi) — Daniesh Suffian
Norisma Abdulrahman	"I Swear" (Sumpah) — Aina Abdul
Harith Aliff	"Two of Us" (Jodoh Berdua) — Hafiz Hamidon
Firas Aliyan Fazli	"Forever" (Selamanya) — Usop
Clinton Jerome Chua	"I Want You to Love Me" — Alif Satar
Akmal Izzat Hamdan	"I Swear" (Sumpah) — Naim Daniel
Ahmad Syamim	"Oh, Please" (Bisa Aja) — Faizal Tahir
Second batch
Aiman Ridzwan Norazmi	"Get Up" (Bangkit) — Haqiem Rusli
Murni Kaseh Rahim	"Best For You" (Terbaik Bagimu) — Siti Nurhaliza
Misha Nabilla Azlan	"Assumed You Come Back" (Andaikan Kau Datang Kembali) — Ruth Sahanaya
Zulfeka Nasrun	"You Hurt Me" (Kau Sakiti) — Amir Masdi
Faiz Hazni	"And Today" (Dan Hari Ini) — Yusrizan Usop
