= List of I Can See Your Voice Malaysia (Malay language) episodes =

Television game show episode list

About the series
- I Can See Your Voice Malaysia is a Malaysian Malay-language television mystery music game show produced by Primeworks Studios and broadcast by NTV7 and TV3, featuring its format based on the South Korean programme of the same title.
- More about the series

Episodes overview
- Total episode(s): 95
- Aired episode(s): 90
- Special episode(s): 5

The Malaysian Malay-language television mystery music game show I Can See Your Voice Malaysia has played a total of seven seasons and 95 episodes; broadcasting on two different networks — NTV7 (from 4 August 2018 to 3 November 2018) and TV3 (from 23 June 2019 to 8 September 2024).

== Series overview ==
Series	Episodes		Originally released			Good singers	Bad singers
Series	Episodes		First released	Last released	Network	Good singers	Bad singers
1	13		4 August 2018	27 October 2018	NTV7	7	6
2	13		23 June 2019	15 September 2019	TV3	7	6
3	20 (Note: The 3rd season has originally scheduled to air for 10 episodes, with Sufian Suhaimi playing on its tentative [10th episode] finale on 19 April 2020; this was later added by 11 episodes until the formal conclusion on 23 August 2020.)	10	16 February 2020	19 April 2020	TV3	11	9
3	20	10	21 June 2020	23 August 2020	TV3	11	9
4	11		23 May 2021	1 August 2021	TV3	5	6
5	11		15 May 2022	24 July 2022	TV3	7	4
6	11		4 June 2023	13 August 2023	TV3	7	4
7	11		23 June 2024	8 September 2024	TV3	7	4
Sp	5		3 November 2018	8 May 2022	—N/a	2	1

== Episodes ==
=== Season 1 (2018) ===
List of season 1 episodes
No. overall	No. in season	Guest artist(s)	Player order (Note: It refers to the guest artist(s) that have played in according to their first game; returning guest artists (which also include foreigners or former good singers, with their names displaying in italics) are not counted.)	Original release date
1	1	Cakra Khan (Note: Foreign guest artists: Indonesia — Cakra Khan (Note: Highlights: Cakra Khan (s1 ep. 1) also returned on his 2nd game as a foreigner, when he last played for the Indonesian 1st season.; Ungu designated as a group, in which different members playing on subsequent games are actually returned; Enda and Arlonsy returned on their 2nd game as locals, when they last played for the Indonesian 4th season.; Good singer Iman Troye (s5 ep. 8) also returned, playing as a guest artist.) and Pasha (of Ungu))	—	4 August 2018
2	2	Ayda Jebat	1	11 August 2018
3	3	De Fam	2	18 August 2018
4	4	Wany Hasrita	3	25 August 2018
5	5	Faizal Tahir	4	1 September 2018
6	6	Misha Omar	5	8 September 2018
7	7	Hazama Azmi	6	15 September 2018
8	8	Kaka Azraff	7	22 September 2018
9	9	Black Hanifah	8	29 September 2018
10	10	Ziana Zain	9	6 October 2018
11	11	Dayang Nurfaizah	10	13 October 2018
12	12	Altimet	11	20 October 2018
13	13	Pasha (Ungu)	12	27 October 2018

=== Season 2 (2019) ===
List of season 2 episodes
No. overall	No. in season	Guest artist(s)	Player order	Original release date
14	1	Hael Husaini	13	23 June 2019
15	2	Khai Bahar	14	30 June 2019
16	3	Nabila Razali	15	7 July 2019
17	4	Datin Alyah	16	14 July 2019
18	5	Syamel	17	21 July 2019
19	6	Siti Sarah	18	28 July 2019
20	7	Floor 88	19	4 August 2019
21	8	Haqiem Rusli	20	11 August 2019
22	9	Ella	21	18 August 2019
23	10	Sam (Bunkface)	22	25 August 2019
24	11	Ajai	23	1 September 2019
25	12	Mas Idayu	24	8 September 2019
26	13	Mark Adam	25	15 September 2019

=== Season 3 (2020) ===
List of season 3 episodes
No. overall	No. in season	Guest artist(s)	Player order	Original release date
Part 1
27	1	Sham Visa	26	16 February 2020
28	2	Stacy	27	23 February 2020
29	3	Ismail Izzani	28	1 March 2020
30	4	Siti Nordiana	29	8 March 2020
31	5	Datuk Hattan	30	15 March 2020
32	6	Erra Fazira	31	22 March 2020
33	7	Andi Bernadee	32	29 March 2020
34	8	MK (K-Clique)	33	5 April 2020
35	9	Shila Amzah	34	12 April 2020
36	10	Sufian Suhaimi	35	19 April 2020
Part 2
37	11	Naim Daniel	37	21 June 2020
38	12	Zizi Kirana	38	28 June 2020
39	13	Neeta Manishaa (IamNEETA)	39	5 July 2020
40	14	Ara Johari	40	12 July 2020
41	15	Ronnie Hussein	41	19 July 2020
42	16	Amy Mastura	42	26 July 2020
43	17	Akim Ahmad	43	2 August 2020
44	18	Marsha Milan	44	9 August 2020
45	19	Noraniza Idris	45	16 August 2020
46	20	Nashrudin Elias (Lefthanded)	46	23 August 2020

=== Season 4 (2021) ===
List of season 4 episodes
No. overall	No. in season	Guest artist(s)	Player order	Original release date
47	1	Hafiz Suip	47	23 May 2021
48	2	Yonnyboii	48	30 May 2021
49	3	Fauziah Latiff	49	6 June 2021
50	4	Aina Abdul	50	13 June 2021
51	5	Amir Masdi	51	20 June 2021
52	6	Ernie Zakri	52	27 June 2021
53	7	Ruffedge	53	4 July 2021
54	8	Azlan & the Typewriter	54	11 July 2021
55	9	Adira Suhaimi	55	18 July 2021
56	10	Alif Satar and The Locos	56–57	25 July 2021
57	11	Amy Search	58	1 August 2021

=== Season 5 (2022) ===
List of season 5 episodes
No. overall	No. in season	Guest artist(s)	Player order	Original release date
58	1	Nabila Razali and MK (K-Clique)	—	15 May 2022
59	2	Zizi Kirana	—	22 May 2022
60	3	Dolla	60	29 May 2022
61	4	Misha Omar and Ella	—	5 June 2022
62	5	Zamani Ibrahim (Slam)	61	12 June 2022
63	6	Haqiem Rusli and Afieq Shazwan	62	19 June 2022
64	7	SOG and Shila Amzah	63	26 June 2022
65	8	Iman Troye	—	3 July 2022
66	9	Azlan & the Typewriter and Tam Mustafah	64	10 July 2022
67	10	Janna Nick	65	17 July 2022
68	11	Siti Nurhaliza	66	24 July 2022

=== Season 6 (2023) ===
List of season 6 episodes
No. overall	No. in season	Guest artist(s)	Player order	Original release date
69	1	Siti Sisters (Siti Saida and Siti Saerah)	67–68	4 June 2023
70	2	Aisha Retno	69	11 June 2023
71	3	Aepul Roza	70	18 June 2023
72	4	Liza Hanim	71	25 June 2023
73	5	Aizat Amdan	72	2 July 2023
74	6	Kugiran Masdo	73	9 July 2023
75	7	Wani Kayrie	74	16 July 2023
76	8	The Jamals (Zaki Yamani and Yamani Abdillah)	75–76	23 July 2023
77	9	Kmy Kmo and Luca Sickta	77–78	30 July 2023
78	10	Insomniacks	79	6 August 2023
79	11	Lan Solo	80	13 August 2023

=== Season 7 (2024) ===
List of season 7 episodes
No. overall	No. in season	Guest artist(s)	Player order	Original release date
80	1	Sharif Zero	81	23 June 2024
81	2	Afieq Shazwan and Chacha Maembong (Note: Despite not singing, they were still counted as guest artists.)	82	30 June 2024
82	3	Amy Mastura	—	7 July 2024
83	4	Puteri Khareeza	83	14 July 2024
84	5	Adira Suhaimi and Ayie Elham	—	21 July 2024
85	6	Amir Masdi	—	28 July 2024
86	7	Vanessa Reynauld	84	4 August 2024
87	8	Ara Johari	—	18 August 2024
88	9	Janna Nick	—	25 August 2024
89	10	Harissa Adlynn and Fahimi Rahmat	85–86	1 September 2024
90	11	Khai Bahar	—	8 September 2024

== Specials ==
List of special episodes
No.	Title	Guest artist(s)	Player order	Original release date
1	"Encore Concert — 2018 edition"	—	—	3 November 2018
2	"Encore Concert — 2019 edition"	—	—	29 September 2019
3	"Eid al-Fitr special — 2020 edition"	Ramlah Ram	36	31 May 2020
4	"Eid al-Fitr special — 2021 edition"	Floor 88	—	16 May 2021
5	"Eid al-Fitr special — 2022 edition"	Tajul Ariff and Naim Daniel	59	8 May 2022
