= I Can See Your Voice Malaysia (Malay language) season 5 =

Television game show season

I Can See Your Voice Malaysia
- Season 5
- Starring: Andi Bernadee; Janna Nick; Rosyam Nor
- Hosted by: Ain Edruce; Izzue Islam
- Winners: Good singers: 7; Bad singers: 5
- No. of episodes: Regular: 11; Special: 1; Overall: 12

Release
- Original network: TV3
- Original release: 8 May – 24 July 2022

Season chronology
- ← Previous; Season 4 Next → Season 6

The fifth season of the Malaysian Malay-language television mystery music game show I Can See Your Voice Malaysia premiered on TV3 with an Eid al-Fitr special on 8 May 2022.

== Gameplay ==
=== Format ===
According to the original South Korean rules, the guest artist(s) must attempt to eliminate bad singers during its game phase. At the final performance, the last remaining mystery singer is revealed as either good or bad by means of a duet between them and one of the guest artists.

If the last remaining mystery singer is good, they will have chance to grant a potential contract on any recording label; if a singer is bad, they win RM5,000.

=== Rounds ===
1. Visual round
  Each mystery singer is given two different identities as a good and bad singer, with one of them is a real identity.
2. Lip sync round
  The mystery singer lip syncs to the good singer's recording, then a bad singer's recording comes in the middle of the performance.
3. Rehearsal round
  Three random panelists are wearing headphones to listen to a recording of assigned mystery singer that lasts for 15 seconds. Afterward, the panelist defends the mystery singer and convince the guest artist to choose them for a final performance.

== Episodes ==
=== Guest artists ===
Legend:
Good singer
Bad singer

Episode		Guest artist (Note: Players' notes: For the returning guest artists (who also include foreigners and former good singers), names are displayed in italics.; For the mixed groups, names who identified as bad singers are displayed in italics.)	Mystery singers (In their respective numbers and aliases)					
#	Date	Guest artist	Elimination order					Winner
#	Date	Guest artist	Visual round	Lip sync round		Rehearsal round		Winner
Special	8 May 2022	Tajul Ariff and Naim Daniel	6. Ahmad Aqil Mohammed	1. Ahmed Yusuf	3. Noralia Amaniana	2. Syahrul Azhar	5. Liana Faisa Azni	4. Muhammad Shafiq
1	15 May 2022	Nabila Razali and MK (K-Clique)	1. Muhammad Izzat	2. Ameerah Nur Hidayah	4. Alif Danial Ismail	6. Mohd Zain Ramli	5. Siti Nadiah Sidri	3. Muhammad Samsudian
2	22 May 2022	Zizi Kirana	5. Elyana Sophea	3. Nik Nurul Asyikin	4. Alyana Suhaimi	6. Abdul Rahim Busari	2. Amira Syakilla	1. Baktiah Abdullah
3	29 May 2022	Dolla	4. Muhammad Noor Asharie	1. Kimberly Chuah	2. Mahzan Afthar	3. Intan Shafinas Razak	6. Sukashiiz	5. Nurul Atikha Kamarudin
4	5 June 2022	Misha Omar and Ella	5. Siti Atirah Hadi	3. Norhafizah Diyana	4. Mohammad Hafiezul	6. Wong Xin Yao	2. Syahaniza Ismail	1. Khaisal Nurilla
5	12 June 2022	Zamani Ibrahim (Slam)	1. Latifi Mohamed	3. Khaiqal Haziq Khalid	6. Amirul Hafiz Rahman	2. Shafeeq Satrianie	5. Amal Hakim Aswandi	4. Sallehuddin Ali
6	19 June 2022	Haqiem Rusli and Afieq Shazwan	2. Hanafi Yahya	1. Muhammad Aliff	5. Siti Nur Atiqah	6. Muhd Nuh Osman	3. Afiq Syahmi	4. Raja Nurasyrul
7	26 June 2022	SOG and Shila Amzah	5. Aliff Ali	1. Eliana Mohamad	4. Zainal Alieff Azimat	2. Aiman Imran Danial	6. Mohammad Hafizi	3. Iskandar Afif
8	3 July 2022	Iman Troye (Note: Season highlight: Good singer Iman Troye (ep. 8) also returned, playing as a guest artist.)	5. Mohd Ilham Fitri	1. Farhan Farizwan	6. Azalina Abdul Razak	3. Ramdan Mazlan	4. Zuhairi Nordin	2. Adrieana Mizra
9	10 July 2022	Azlan & the Typewriter and Tam Mustafah	2. Atikah Rosli	1. Rashid Hamdan	3. Abdul Wadood	4. Mohd Noor Ariff	5. Chan Fan Ee	6. Rahmat Shah Putra
10	17 July 2022	Janna Nick	4. Arief Hakim Jaafar	3. Izzuddin Rosli	5. Hakim Nazmie Shamsuddin	1. Amirah Balqis Zamri	6. Nasir Abdullah	2. Syazwan Saadon
11	24 July 2022	Siti Nurhaliza	1. Siti Nurhafidzah Ayub	2. Ahmad Aiman	4. Deliyana Suyanto	3. Noorshamira Solleh	5. Muhammad Hadi Hafsham	6. Mohamad Hairul

=== Panelists ===
Legend:
Regular panelist
Guest panelist

Apps		Panelists in attendance (Sorted by first appearance, with episode designations)
g#	p#	Panelists in attendance (Sorted by first appearance, with episode designations)
12	1	Andi Bernadee (1–11; sp. 1)
11	2	Rosyam Nor (1–5, 7–11; sp. 1); Janna Nick (1–9, 11; sp. 1)
1	37	Zulin Aziz, Kilafairy, and Shiha Zikir (sp. 1); Amir Masdi, Eira Syazira, and Yonnyboii (1); Altimet, Marsha Milan, and Sophiana Liana (2); Ruhainies, Sean Lee, and Zynakal (3); Zarul Umbrella, Amy Mastura, and Lan Solo (4); Hazama Azmi, Ropie Cecupak, and Black Hanifah (5); Afdlin Shauki, Stacy, Sufian Suhaimi, and Sarah Suhairi (6); Mas Idayu, Azhan Rani, and Zara Zya (7); Ezlynn, Ara Johari, and Tam Suhaimi (8); Riena Diana, Bell Ngasri, and Azira Shafinaz (9); Mark Adam, Fatin Afeefa, and Dini Schatzmann (Note: Panelists' note: Foreign attendee: Dini Schatzmann (CHE)) (10); Johan Hanania, Wany Hasrita, and Bob Yusof (11)

== Online Singing Contest ==
Also in this season, a singing contest was held as a virtual event, in which one of the winning good singers would grant an exclusive contract and a single on any record label, to be determined through judging criteria (consisting of 60% by jury and 40% by public votes via Xtra website).

Legend:
Winner

I Can See Your Voice Malaysia season 5 — Online Concert performances
Performer(s)	Song(s)
Muhammad Samsudian	"Love Pursuits" (Sesucinya Cintamu) — Anuar Zain
Nurul Atikha Kamarudin	"Don't Miss Out" (Jangan Terlepas Pandang) — Wani Kayrie
Khaisal Nurilla	"I'm Not Ready to Lose" (Belum Siap Kehilangan) — Stevan Pasaribu
Sallehuddin Ali	"When You're Gone" (Bila Kau Tiada) — Syamel
Raja Nurasyul	"There's a Missing Snow in the Lake" (Salju di Danau Rindu) — Mamat (Exists)
Adrieana Mizra	"My Cup of Love" (Cintaku Dalam Cawan) — Dalia Farhana
Rahmat Shah Putra	"Talking to the Moon" — Bruno Mars
