= I Can See Your Voice Malaysia (Malay language) season 4 =

Television game show season

I Can See Your Voice Malaysia
- Season 4
- Starring: Jihan Muse; Fad Bocey; Alif Satar
- Hosted by: Sean Lee; Shuk Sahar
- Winners: Good singers: 6; Bad singers: 6
- No. of episodes: Regular: 11; Special: 1; Overall: 12

Release
- Original network: TV3
- Original release: 16 May – 1 August 2021

Season chronology
- ← Previous; Season 3 Next → Season 5

The fourth season of the Malaysian Malay-language television mystery music game show I Can See Your Voice Malaysia premiered on TV3 with an Eid al-Fitr special on 16 May 2021.

At the time of filming during the COVID-19 pandemic, health and safety protocols are also implemented.

== Gameplay ==
=== Format ===
According to the original South Korean rules, the guest artist(s) must attempt to eliminate bad singers during its game phase. At the final performance, the last remaining mystery singer is revealed as either good or bad by means of a duet between them and one of the guest artists.

If the last remaining mystery singer is good, they will have chance to grant a potential contract on any recording label; if a singer is bad, they win RM3,000.

=== Rounds ===
1. Visual round
  Each mystery singer is given two different identities as a good and bad singer, with one of them is a real identity.
2. Lip sync round
  The mystery singer lip syncs to the good singer's recording, then a bad singer's recording comes in the middle of the performance.
3. Rehearsal round
  Three random panelists are wearing headphones to listen to a recording of assigned mystery singer that lasts for 15 seconds. Afterward, the panelist defends the mystery singer and convince the guest artist to choose them for a final performance.

== Episodes ==
=== Guest artists ===
Legend:
Good singer
Bad singer

Episode		Guest artist (Note: Players' notes: For the returning guest artists (who also include foreigners and former good singers), names are displayed in italics.; For the mixed groups, names who identified as bad singers are displayed in italics.)	Mystery singers (In their respective numbers and aliases)					
#	Date	Guest artist	Elimination order					Winner
#	Date	Guest artist	Visual round	Lip sync round		Rehearsal round		Winner
Special	16 May 2021	Floor 88	3. Raihan Abdul Rahim	1. Fareez Adnan	6. Najwa Husna Azman	2. Fawwaz Yaacob	4. Mustari Munawar	5. Ekhmal Fauzi
1	23 May 2021	Hafiz Suip	1. Aidil Najimuddin and Amirul Eizam	5. Alif Najmi	2. Puteri Nur Farra	6. Syazwani Syahirah	4. Amir Aiman	3. Nur Yusra Yusoff
2	30 May 2021	Yonnyboii	4. Amir Asyraf	5. Syafiq Daniel	1. Ahmad Fadzlullah	6. Andrianna Fernandez	2. Khairul Hafizi	3. Anis Izzaty
3	6 June 2021	Fauziah Latiff	2. Aishah Farisha	1. Aiman Shakimi	5. Yulia Kamelia	4. Hazil Luqman	3. Muhammad Dzulqarnain	6. Fadli Shaharibuddin
4	13 June 2021	Aina Abdul	6. Muhammad Amirul	3. Natasha Jeffrey	4. Elyazril Idris	5. Siti Nurdiyana	1. Izzat Mazurif	2. Adzham Adnan
5	20 June 2021	Amir Masdi	1. Hakim Muqris	4. Amri Hazique	6. Qurratu'ain Kamarul Zaman	5. Zulhilmi Ammar	3. Aliff Ramdhan	2. Ahmad Ariff
6	27 June 2021	Ernie Zakri	1. Adriana Balqis	3. Saqif Tuan	6. Mohamad Safwan	5. Asyiqin Alaimy	4. Akmal Hakim	2. Borhanuddin Afgani
7	4 July 2021	Ruffedge	1. Aalia Anuar	6. Farrah Yasmaine	5. Nik Mohd Rashdan	3. Aisamuddin Nazli	2. Asyraf Farhan	4. Mohd Firdaus
8	11 July 2021	Azlan & the Typewriter	1. Hakimi Jamal	4. Jerahmiel George	2. Khadijah Mefiza	3. Khairussani Fazil	6. Saidatul Syafiqah	5. Mohamad Nor Azli
9	18 July 2021	Adira Suhaimi	2. Azizul Hakim	5. Alshaari Nasruddin	3. Nuha Nazurah	4. Nuraini Nazihah	1. Syafiq Eliza	6. Abdul Rahman Muttaqin
10	25 July 2021	Alif Satar and The Locos	5. Amirun Afiq	1. Fazlee Ramli	6. Shaiful Hasbullah	4. Nazreen Haiqal	2. Aidel Sulaiman	3. Nik Shahidan
11	1 August 2021	Amy Search	4. Anita Kamarjun	2. Nurul Syuhaida	1. Muhammad Aiqat Sallihi	6. Amirul Ashraf	3. Syafiq Aizad	5. Hazirah Rashid

=== Panelists ===
Legend:
Regular panelist
Guest panelist

Apps		Panelists in attendance (Sorted by first appearance, with episode designations)
g#	p#	Panelists in attendance (Sorted by first appearance, with episode designations)
12	1	Fad Bocey and Jihan Muse (1–11; sp. 1)
9	1	Alif Satar (1, 4–9, 11; sp. 1)
1	30	Yusry Abdul Halim (KRU), Mark Adam, and Seelan Paul (sp. 1); Haziq Hussni and Loca B (1); Hael Husaini, Sissy Imann, and Izzue Islam (2); Norman Hakim, Catriona Ross, and Maryam Younarae (3); Saiful Apek, Azlee Jaafar, and Wahid Mohd (4); Nadia Brian and Neeta Manishaa (5); Jiggy Masin and Syamel (6); Umie Aida and Issey Titan (7); Didie Alias and Rosyam Nor (8); Bella Astillah, Atu Zero, and Jang Han-byul (Note: Panelists' note: Foreign attendee: Jang Han-byul (ROK)) (9); Caprice, Naim Daniel, and Nabila Huda (10); Hazama Azmi and Ain Edruce (11)

== Online Singing Contest ==
Also in this season, a singing contest was held as a virtual event, in which one of the winning good singers would grant an exclusive contract and a single on any record label, to be determined through judging criteria (consisting of 60% by jury and 40% by public votes via Xtra website).

Legend:
Winner

I Can See Your Voice Malaysia season 4 — Online Concert performances
Performer(s)	Song(s)
Ekhmal Fauzi	"Laila's Dream" (Mimpi Laila) — Yasin Sulaiman
Nur Yusra Yusoff	"Rain On Me" — Lady Gaga and Ariana Grande
Fadli Shaharibuddin	"Oh, Dear" (Aduh Saliha) — Mawi
Adzham Adnan	"Hallucinations" (Halusinasi) — Syamel
Borhanuddin Afgani	"Grenade" — Bruno Mars
Nik Shahidan	"Morning Couple, Evening Couple" (Kais Pagi, Kais Petang) — Andi Bernadee
