= I Can See Your Voice Malaysia (Malay language) season 7 =

Television game show season

I Can See Your Voice Malaysia
- Season 7
- Starring: Siti Khadijah Halim; Naim Daniel; Bell Ngasri; Riena Diana
- Hosted by: Izzue Islam; Shiha Zikir
- Winners: Good singers: 7; Bad singers: 4
- No. of episodes: 11

Release
- Original network: TV3
- Original release: 23 June – 8 September 2024

Season chronology
- ← Previous; Season 6 Next → Season 8

The seventh season of the Malaysian Malay-language television mystery music game show I Can See Your Voice Malaysia premiered on TV3 on 23 June 2024.

== Gameplay ==
=== Format ===
According to the original South Korean rules, the guest artist(s) must attempt to eliminate bad singers during its game phase. At the final performance, the last remaining mystery singer is revealed as either good or bad by means of a duet between them and one of the guest artists.

If the last remaining mystery singer is good, they will have chance to grant a potential contract on any recording label; if a singer is bad, they win RM3,000.

=== Rounds ===
1. Visual round
  Each mystery singer is given two different identities as a good and bad singer, with one of them is a real identity.
2. Lip sync round
  The mystery singer lip syncs to the good singer's recording, then a bad singer's recording comes in the middle of the performance.
3. Rehearsal round
  Three random panelists are wearing headphones to listen to a recording of assigned mystery singer that lasts for 15 seconds. Afterward, the panelist defends the mystery singer and convince the guest artist to choose them for a final performance.

== Episodes ==
=== Guest artists ===
| Legend: |
Good singer
Bad singer

| Episode | | Guest artist (Note: Players' notes: For the returning guest artists (who also include foreigners and former good singers), names are displayed in italics.; For the mixed groups, names who identified as bad singers are displayed in italics.) | Mystery singers (In their respective numbers and aliases) | | | | | |
| # | Date | Guest artist | Elimination order | | | | | Winner |
| # | Date | Guest artist | Visual round | Lip sync round | | Rehearsal round | | Winner |
|---|---|---|---|---|---|---|---|---|
| 1 | 23 June 2024 | Sharif Zero | 5. Darlisfitri Miskam | 2. Syaiful Muhamad Syafiq | 3. Siti Farah Najihah | 4. Khairul Idlan | 6. Nor Afidah Mohammad | 1. Mohamad Azizul and Mohd Hafizuddin |
| 2 | 30 June 2024 | Afieq Shazwan and Chacha Maembong (Note: Despite not singing, they were still counted as guest artists.) | 4. Zulfaqqar | 1. Muhammad Heyqal | 6. Abdul Raziff | 2. Afi Faizal | 5. Nur Farah Najwa | 3. Syahril Azar and Siti Syafrina |
| 3 | 7 July 2024 | Amy Mastura | 1. Shyafira Maslan | 6. Nor Nabilah and Aliyah Adilah | 5. Muhammad Nurshahmi | 3. Nur Madeena | 2. Helmi Iskandar | 4. Shaumi Nazira |
| 4 | 14 July 2024 | Puteri Khareeza | 1. Mohd Jamri Zahpar | 5. Nur Khalaf Zulkafli | 6. Iffa Izzaty and Iffa Zahirah | 4. Yusniza Yusoh | 3. Izamudin Mohd Yusoff | 2. Devasri Dee |
| 5 | 21 July 2024 | Adira Suhaimi and Ayie Elham | 5. Ammar Safwan | 1. Akhmal Abidin | 3. Aiga Fabiana | 2. Saifuddin | 4. Nur Akhmal | 6. Nilam Sari and Faizatunor Mahali |
| 6 | 28 July 2024 | Amir Masdi | 2. Mohd Hazli Razali | 5. Nur Aiza Amira | 6. Sharizuan Mustafa | 3. Harul Ain and Muhammad Iqbal | 4. Faiz Ashraf | 1. Khairunissa Suraidi |
| 7 | 4 August 2024 | Vanessa Reynauld | 1. Muhammad Hazlan | 2. Fatin Nur Aqilah | 6. Syafrina Suhaimi | 4. Yusri Noramin and Amirul Amru | 5. Amir Asyraf | 3. Norizwan Azlan |
Season break: August 11 episode was pre-empted to give way for the airing of the 2024 Malaysian TikTok Awards Night.
| 8 | 18 August 2024 | Ara Johari | 5. Irfan Afiq | 2. Areffa Zunaidin | 4. Malisa Damia | 3. Mohamad Zairi and Siti Norkalziah | 6. Divya Mithran | 1. Zizi Safira |
| 9 | 25 August 2024 | Janna Nick | 1. Amirul Syazwan and Abdullah Ariffin | 4. Farid Fuad | 5. Nur Alieya | 3. Nor Ayuzi | 2. Mohamad Fairos | 6. Hazrul Alif |
| 10 | 1 September 2024 | Harissa Adlynn and Fahimi Rahmat | 1. Syed Mohamad Luqman | 3. Muhammad Mursyid | 6. Azmi Ali | 2. Puteri Quratul Ain and Mohd Salehudin | 4. Sharifah Nurul Shahirah | 5. Siti Zakirah Asyiqah |
| 11 | 8 September 2024 | Khai Bahar | 2. Syarifah Adeeba | 5. Amran Atan | 6. Sharifah Aleeya | 4. Ameer Iezrull | 1. Marlin Marlida | 3. Muhammad Norie and Muhammad Iskandar |

=== Panelists ===
| Legend: |
Regular panelist
Guest panelist

| Apps | | Panelists in attendance (Sorted by first appearance, with episode designations) |
| g# | p# | Panelists in attendance (Sorted by first appearance, with episode designations) |
|---|---|---|
| 11 | 3 | Siti Khadijah Halim, Bell Ngasri, and Riena Diana (1–11) |
| 10 | 1 | Naim Daniel (1–2, 4–11) |
| 1 | 23 | Ajai and Ryan Bakery (1); Nadia Brian and Afifah Nasir (2); Noorkhiriah, Azhan Rani, and Sufian Suhaimi (3); Elvina Mohamad and Aizat Saha (4); Noki K-Clique and Emma Suhaimi (5); Adriana Adnan and Iman Troye (6); Shalma Ainaa and Anna Jobling (7); Nadeera Zaini and Ernie Zakri (8); Yusof Haslam and Puteri Sarah Liyana (9); Ezzrin Loy and Sharifah Rose (10); Wany Hasrita and Marsha Milan (11) |
