= I Can See Your Voice Malaysia (Chinese language) season 2 =

Television game show season

I Can See Your Voice Malaysia
- Season 2
- Starring: Rickman Chia; Hoon Mei Sim; Orange Tan; Gary Yap
- Hosted by: Wind Lee; Xiaoyu
- No. of episodes: Regular: 13; Special: 2; Overall: 15

Release
- Original network: 8TV
- Original release: Regular season: 19 August – 18 November 2018; Specials: 25 December 2018; 5 February 2019

Season chronology
- ← Previous; Season 1

The second season of the Malaysian Mandarin-language television mystery music game show I Can See Your Voice Malaysia premiered on 8TV on 19 August 2018; this was also accompanied by a first season of its Malay-language counterpart that began airing on NTV7 on 4 August 2018.

== Gameplay ==
=== Format ===
According to the original South Korean rules, the guest artist(s) must attempt to eliminate bad singers during its game phase. At the final performance, the last remaining mystery singer is revealed as either good or bad by means of a duet between them and one of the guest artists.

=== Rounds ===
1. Visual round
  Each mystery singer is given two different identities as a good and bad singer, with one of them is a real identity.
2. Lip sync round
  The mystery singer lip syncs to the good singer's recording, then a bad singer's recording comes in the middle of the performance.
3. Rehearsal round
  Three random panelists are wearing headphones to listen to a recording of assigned mystery singer that lasts for 15 seconds. Afterward, the panelist defends the mystery singer and convince the guest artist to choose them for a final performance.

== Episodes ==
=== Guest artists ===
Legend:
Good singer
Bad singer

Episode		Guest artist (Note: Players' notes: For the returning guest artists (who also include foreigners and former good singers), names are displayed in italics.; For the mixed groups, names who identified as bad singers are displayed in italics.)	Mystery singers (In their respective numbers and aliases)					
#	Date	Guest artist	Elimination order					Winner
#	Date	Guest artist	Visual round	Lip sync round		Evidence round		Winner
1	19 August 2018	Michael Wong	5. Clinton Jerome Chua () (Note: Season highlights: Good singer Clinton Jerome Chua (ep. 1) later returned on his 2nd game to win by performing a duet with Shila Amzah for its Malay-language counterpart's 3rd season.; Foreign guest artists: Hong Kong — Joyce Cheng (ep. 10) and Ruco Chan (ep. 13); Taiwan — Linda Chien (ep. 4))	3. ()	1. ()	2. ()	4. ()	6. ()
2	26 August 2018	Janice Tan	1. ()	2. ()	3. ()	4. ()	5. ()	6. ()
3	2 September 2018	Danny Koo	1. ()	2. ()	3. ()	4. ()	5. ()	6. ()
4	9 September 2018	Linda Chien	1. ()	2. ()	3. ()	4. ()	5. ()	6. ()
5	16 September 2018	Abin Fang	1. ()	2. ()	3. ()	4. ()	5. ()	6. ()
6	23 September 2018	Nichole Lai	1. ()	2. ()	3. ()	4. ()	5. ()	6. ()
7	30 September 2018	Penny Tai	1. ()	2. ()	3. ()	4. ()	5. ()	6. ()
8	14 October 2018	Shio Yee Quek	1. ()	2. ()	3. ()	4. ()	5. ()	6. ()
9	21 October 2018	Henley Hii	1. ()	2. ()	3. ()	4. ()	5. ()	6. ()
10	28 October 2018	Joyce Cheng	1. ()	2. ()	3. ()	4. ()	5. ()	6. ()
11	4 November 2018	DannyOne (Da.Mon.Ster)	1. ()	2. ()	3. ()	4. ()	5. ()	6. ()
12	11 November 2018	Priscilla Abby	1. ()	2. ()	3. ()	4. ()	5. ()	6. ()
13	18 November 2018	Ruco Chan	1. ()	2. ()	3. ()	4. ()	5. ()	6. ()
Special	5 February 2019	Nick and Stella Chung	1. ()	2. ()	3. ()	4. ()	5. ()	6. ()

=== Panelists ===
Legend:
Regular panelist
Additional panelist
Guest panelist

Apps		Panelists in attendance (Sorted by first appearance, with episode designations)
g#	p#	Panelists in attendance (Sorted by first appearance, with episode designations)
7	1	Orange Tan (1, 3, 7–10; sp. 1)
6	3	Hoon Mei Sim (1, 3, 5, 7, 9–10); Rickman Chia (2, 5, 10–13); Gary Yap (4–8; sp. 1)
5	1	Luke Loke (1, 3, 9, 13; sp. 1)
3	2	Lim Ching Miau (2, 4, 11); KK (Note: Panelists' note: Foreign attendees: Ding Ding and KK (CHN); Janice Koh (SGP); and CN Chang and Dabow Hsia (TWN)) (7, 10, 12)
2	3	Chrystina Ng (2, 8); Tan Ley Teng (2; sp. 1); KeQing (5, 13)
1	28	Joe Chang and Bernard Guo (1); Lovell Jia (2); Janelle Chin and Jordan Sen (3); Cheryl Lee, Choo Hao Ren, and Yen Hue Tan (4); Lynn Lim (5); Winnie Ho, Evelyn Li, Mi2 (Henna and Yanice), and Nicholas Song (6); Daniel Lee Chee Hun (7); Emily Chan and Wilson Lee (8); Adrian Lee and Desmond Tey (9); Joey Leong (10); Fish Liew, Sherlyn Seo, and John Wee (11); Daniel Fong, Dabow Hsia, and Janice Koh (12); Ding Ding and Jason Poon (13); CN Chang (sp. 1)
