= I Can See Your Voice Malaysia (Malay language) =

Malaysian Malay-language television game show

- Genre: Game show
- Based on: I Can See Your Voice by CJ ENM
- Directed by: Lucent Chong
- Presented by: Alvin Chong (1); Shuk Sahar (1–4); Sean Lee (2–4); Ain Edruce (5); Izzue Islam (5–7); Shiha Zikir (6–7)
- Starring: The celebrity panelists (see cast)
- Country of origin: Malaysia
- Original language: Malay
- No. of seasons: 7
- No. of episodes: Regular: 90; Special: 5; Overall: 95

Production
- Executive producers: Mas Ayu Binti Ali; Jamil Hassan
- Producer: Ikha Arnisya
- Camera setup: Multi-camera
- Production company: Primeworks Studios

Original release
- Network: NTV7
- Release: 4 August – 27 October 2018
- Network: TV3
- Release: 23 June 2019 – 8 September 2024

Related
- I Can See Your Voice franchise

I Can See Your Voice Malaysia is a Malaysian Malay-language television mystery music game show broadcast by NTV7 and TV3, based on the South Korean programme of the same title, featuring its format where guest artist(s) attempt to eliminate bad singers from the group, until the last mystery singer remains for a duet performance. It first aired on 4 August 2018.

== Gameplay ==
=== Format ===
Over the course of several rounds, the guest artist(s) must attempt to eliminate bad singers from a group of six "mystery singers", identified only by their occupation or alias, without ever hearing them perform live. They are assisted by clues regarding the singers' backgrounds, style of performance, and observations from a celebrity panel. At the end of a game, the last remaining mystery singer is revealed as either good or bad by means of a duet between them and one of the guest artists. (Note: Gameplay notes: The number of rounds are set to three (from 1st, 4th, and 6th to 7th season) or four (from 2nd to 3rd season).; The winning bad singer gets RM3,000 (from 1st to 4th, and 6th to 7th season) or RM5,000 (for the 5th season).)

The winning mystery singer, regardless of being good or bad, gets a reward on the following conditions:

- If a singer is good, they;
  - s1–2: will have to perform again at the encore concert.
  - s3–7: will have chance to grant a potential contract on any recording label.
- If a singer is bad, they win a cash prize.

=== Rounds ===
==== Visual rounds ====
- s1–2: The guest artist is given some time to observe and examine each mystery singer based on their appearance. Afterward, a muted video of each mystery singer that reveals only 0.3 seconds of their singing voice is played as an additional hint.
- s3–7: Each mystery singer is given two different identities as a good and bad singer, with one of them is a real identity.

==== Lip sync rounds ====
- s1–2: Each mystery singer performs a lip sync to a song; good singers mime to a recording of their own, while bad singers mime to a backing track by another vocalist.
- s3–7: The mystery singer lip syncs to the good singer's recording, then a bad singer's recording comes in the middle of the performance.

==== Evidence rounds ====
- s2–3: The guest artist is presented with a video package featuring a "super fan" by one of the mystery singers.
- s3: The host has randomly assigned clues about the mystery singer, and then the guest artist must choose a clue for each one.

==== Rehearsal round ====
- s1–2, 4–7: Three random panelists are wearing headphones to listen to a recording of assigned mystery singer that lasts for 15 seconds. Afterward, the panelist defends the mystery singer and convince the guest artist to choose them for a final performance.

== Production ==
Media Prima Berhad formally acquired the rights to produce separate, multilingual adaptations of I Can See Your Voice in Malaysia, with 8TV for the Mandarin-language counterpart in April 2017 and NTV7 for the Malay-language counterpart in June 2018, with the in-house Primeworks Studios assigning on production duties.

== Broadcast history ==
The Malay-language counterpart of I Can See Your Voice debuted on NTV7 on 4 August 2018, with filming taking place at Sri Pentas Studios in Shah Alam. (Note: Highlight: Cakra Khan (s1 ep. 1) also returned on his 2nd game as a foreigner, when he last played for the Indonesian 1st season.)

One week before first season's encore concert, the series has already announced its renewal for a second season and subsequent move to TV3, which began airing on 23 June 2019.

The third season premiered with its first set of episodes on 16 February 2020, followed by a second that resumed on 21 June 2020; (Note: The 3rd season has originally scheduled to air for 10 episodes, with Sufian Suhaimi playing on its tentative [10th episode] finale on 19 April 2020; this was later added by 11 episodes until the formal conclusion on 23 August 2020.) also in mid-season, Ramlah Ram played in an Eid al-Fitr special on 31 May 2020. At that time during the COVID-19 pandemic, the show has been produced since then until the fourth season, with health and safety protocols implemented.

The fourth season premiered with Floor 88 playing in an Eid al-Fitr special on 16 May 2021. After that finale, TV3 has already renewed the series for a fifth season, which also premiered with Naim Daniel playing in an Eid al-Fitr special on 8 May 2022.

As part of TV3's 39th anniversary programming lineup that announced in May 2023, the said network renewed the series for a sixth season, which premiered on 4 June 2023.

According to a report from Prensario Internacional in May 2024, TV3 renewed the series for a seventh season, which premiered on 23 June 2024. After that finale, the series has already announced its renewal for an eighth season, commencing with auditions from 18 to 25 May 2025.

For the first two seasons, a series of encore concerts were held after the final game, featuring some of invited mystery singers return to perform one last time. From third to fifth season, a series of singing contests were held as a virtual event, with the winning good singer granting an exclusive contract and a single on any record label.

== Cast ==
The series employs a panel of celebrity "detectives" who assist the guest artists in identifying good and bad mystery singers throughout the game. Along with regular members, guest panelists also appear since the first season. Overall, 16 celebrities have served as panelists, with their original lineup consisting of Mark Adam, Jihan Muse, and Seelan Paul. Later members who joined the group's duties also include Yusry Abdul Halim (KRU) from the 3rd season; Fad Bocey, Alif Satar — from the 4th season; Andi Bernadee, Janna Nick, Rosyam Nor — from the 5th season; Khir Rahman, Baby Shima, Ropie Cecupak — from the 6th season; Siti Khadijah Halim, Naim Daniel, Bell Ngasri, and Riena Diana — from the 7th season.

Designations:
H Hosting duties
g# Total games attended, by panelists

Cast member	Seasons							
Cast member	1	2	3	4	5	6	7	8
Alvin Chong	H							TBA
Shuk Sahar	H	H	H	H				TBA
Mark Adam	13	12	21					TBA
Jihan Muse	13	12	21	12		11		TBA
Seelan Paul	10	13						TBA
Sean Lee		H	H	H				TBA
Yusuf Abdul Halim (KRU)			21					TBA
Fad Bocey				12				TBA
Alif Satar				9				TBA
Ain Edruce					H			TBA
Izzue Islam					H	H	H	TBA
Andi Bernadee					12			TBA
Janna Nick					11			TBA
Rosyam Nor					11			TBA
Shiha Zikir						H	H	TBA
Khir Rahman						11		TBA
Baby Shima						11		TBA
Ropie Cecupak						11		TBA
Siti Khadijah Halim							11	TBA
Naim Daniel							10	TBA
Bell Ngasri							11	TBA
Riena Diana							11	TBA

== Series overview ==
Series	Episodes		Originally released			Good singers	Bad singers
Series	Episodes		First released	Last released	Network	Good singers	Bad singers
1	13		4 August 2018	27 October 2018	NTV7	7	6
2	13		23 June 2019	15 September 2019	TV3	7	6
3	20	10	16 February 2020	19 April 2020	TV3	11	9
3	20	10	21 June 2020	23 August 2020	TV3	11	9
4	11		23 May 2021	1 August 2021	TV3	5	6
5	11		15 May 2022	24 July 2022	TV3	7	4
6	11		4 June 2023	13 August 2023	TV3	7	4
7	11		23 June 2024	8 September 2024	TV3	7	4
Sp	5		3 November 2018	8 May 2022	—N/a	2	1
