= I Can See Your Voice Malaysia (Malay language) season 6 =

Television game show season

I Can See Your Voice Malaysia
- Season 6
- Starring: Jihan Muse; Khir Rahman; Baby Shima; Ropie Cecupak
- Hosted by: Izzue Islam; Shiha Zikir
- Winners: Good singers: 7; Bad singers: 4
- No. of episodes: 11

Release
- Original network: TV3
- Original release: 4 June – 13 August 2023

Season chronology
- ← Previous; Season 5 Next → Season 7

The sixth season of the Malaysian Malay-language television mystery music game show I Can See Your Voice Malaysia premiered on TV3 on 4 June 2023.

== Gameplay ==
=== Format ===
According to the original South Korean rules, the guest artist(s) must attempt to eliminate bad singers during its game phase. At the final performance, the last remaining mystery singer is revealed as either good or bad by means of a duet between them and one of the guest artists.

If the last remaining mystery singer is good, they will have chance to grant a potential contract on any recording label; if a singer is bad, they win RM3,000.

=== Rounds ===
1. Visual round
  Each mystery singer is given two different identities as a good and bad singer, with one of them is a real identity.
2. Lip sync round
  The mystery singer lip syncs to the good singer's recording, then a bad singer's recording comes in the middle of the performance.
3. Rehearsal round
  Three random panelists are wearing headphones to listen to a recording of assigned mystery singer that lasts for 15 seconds. Afterward, the panelist defends the mystery singer and convince the guest artist to choose them for a final performance.

== Episodes ==
=== Guest artists ===
Legend:
Good singer
Bad singer

Episode		Guest artist (Note: Players' notes: For the returning guest artists (who also include foreigners and former good singers), names are displayed in italics.; For the mixed groups, names who identified as bad singers are displayed in italics.)	Mystery singers (In their respective numbers and aliases)					
#	Date	Guest artist	Elimination order					Winner
#	Date	Guest artist	Visual round	Lip sync round		Rehearsal round		Winner
1	4 June 2023	Siti Sisters (Siti Saida and Siti Saerah)	3. Arpahdila Anis	4. Daniel Sher	2. Wan Syahirah	6. Alfirdhausy Jaafar	1. Danial Kifli	5. Zainab Rahmat
2	11 June 2023	Aisha Retno	6. Hanis Rozell	5. Zhenson Ngwee	2. Muhammad Syawal	4. Ummu Asma Hakimah	1. Nur Yasmin Dania	3. Nazzim Ariffin
3	18 June 2023	Aepul Roza	4. Nurul Huda	5. Mohamad Fairawani	1. Raihana Rusli	2. Marissa Ashique	6. Muhammad Buraidah	3. Syabil Az-Zafran
4	25 June 2023	Liza Hanim	5. Dwi Yasmin	3. Farah Umianah	6. Fuad Danish	1. Syafawanie Ahmad	4. Daeng Syarif	2. Adam Firdaus
5	2 July 2023	Aizat Amdan	2. Danial Haziq	1. Syamil Farhan	6. Hariz Rafley Shafiq	4. Sofha Hafizin	3. Muhammad Adi Hakim	5. Sarah Hairany
6	9 July 2023	Kugiran Masdo	6. Nurul Atiqah Kirami	1. Nurdhia Qistina	3. Ash Ashraf	4. Ahmad Danial Zariff	2. Fazli Fahmi Jebat	5. Zuleikha Adnam
7	16 July 2023	Wani Kayrie	3. Shahfizal Abdul Rashid	1. Mohd Azamirul	5. Aiman Danial	2. Erika Foo	6. Muhammad Hady	4. Amirah Hadi
8	23 July 2023	The Jamals (Zaki Yamani and Yamani Abdillah)	3. Shazzana Samah	1. Nurhanni Natasha	2. Ahmad Tarmizi	5. Muhammad Shazwan	4. Zahirul Islam	6. Haris Abdul
9	30 July 2023	Kmy Kmo and Luca Sickta	4. Khairul Imam	1. Naufal Hadi	5. Reezlyn Shafeera	6. Hafiz Jamal	3. Hazreen Amreena	2. Danial Harith
10	6 August 2023	Insomniacks	4. Syed Saifullah	3. Farah Rose	1. Nur Afiqah	2. Reyzal Yazmi	6. Nur Damia Ellisda	5. Wan Ahmad Haziq
11	13 August 2023	Lan Solo	6. Puteri Shahira Sabrina	3. Muhd Sazwan	5. Imran Farhan	4. Azmiesyah Azmi	1. Nur Allyia Sofia	2. Alif Azri

=== Panelists ===
Legend:
Regular panelist
Guest panelist

Apps		Panelists in attendance (Sorted by first appearance, with episode designations)
g#	p#	Panelists in attendance (Sorted by first appearance, with episode designations)
11	4	Jihan Muse, Khir Rahman, Baby Shima, and Ropie Cecupak (1–11)
1	22	Nadia Brian and Jiggy Masin (1); Bell Ngasri and Maryam Younarae (2); Roy Azman and Mekyun (3); Cik.B Havoc and Yusof Hashim (4); Joey Daud and Ryan Bakery (5); Amerul Affendi and Sarimah Ibrahim (6); Nadiya Nisaa and Namie Smy (7); Sweet Qismina and Waris (8); Norreen Iman and Bunga Isme (9); Diddie Alias and Roy Azman (10); Daniel Fong and Indah Ruhaila (11)
