= Ain Edruce =

Malaysian actress, host and singer

- Born: Nurulain binti Idrus; 4 August 1991 (age 35); Setiu, Terengganu, Malaysia
- Education: Universiti Teknologi MARA
- Occupations: Actress; Host Television; Singer
- Years active: 2011–present
- Height: 170 cm (5 ft 7 in)
- Spouse: Amirul Hafiz Mustaffa (m. 2019)
- Children: 2

Nurulain Edruce (born 4 August 1991) is a Malaysian actress, host and singer. She is best known as the host of the show MBuzz and as Rosnaida in Kekasih Paksa Rela.

== Career ==
While studying at UiTM, in 2011, Ain began her early career as a model, then began her television career as a lead actress alongside Melda Ahmad and Liyana Kamarhisham in the reality drama Gadis Semasa Sunsilk produced by Red Communications. Four years later, after graduating from UiTM, she hosted the show Girls Only Show which aired on Hypp Inspirasi, a lifestyle channel Unifi TV. She is best known as the host of the two-minute entertainment capsule show MBuzz on TV3.

She has also participated in the reality television show, Lari: Misi Mr. X with Mark Adam, Atu Zero and Nonny Nadirah. Ain acted in the drama Kekasih Paksa Rela starring Intan Najuwa and Remy Ishak, where she played the role of Rosnaida. It was then followed by Kenyalang I'm In Love starring alongside Hafeez Mikail, she played the role of Wanda. Ain played her role as one of the hosts of the show Pop Express on ntv7.

Ain also dabbled in the field of singing when she released her single titled "Overthink", her first attempt as a singer which was also a collaboration with YouTube personality, Akwa Ariffin which was released on 1 January 2020.

On 4 September 2020, Ain was appointed as the Chief Discount Officer of Lazada Malaysia.

In 2022, Ain became the new host of the show I Can See Your Voice Malaysia fifth season with Izzue Islam and Melodi with Haziq Hussni.

In March 2023, Ain was chosen as the face of the Seindah Kasih campaign organized by TV3. At the same time, he acted in the drama My Name Is Lola with Izzue Islam.

== Personal life ==
Ain Edruce is the third of four siblings and holds a Master's Degree in Music Composition from Universiti Teknologi MARA (UiTM) Shah Alam campus, Selangor.

She got engaged to businessman Amirul Hafiz Mustaffa on 22 June 2019, and married on 13 December. She and her husband, Amirul Hafiz were blessed with a daughter who was born on May 19, 2021. The couple named their eldest child Soraya.

== Filmography ==
=== Drama ===
Year	Title	Character	TV Channel	Notes
2011	Gadis Semasa Sunsilk	Tuti	TV3	First drama
2017	Kekasih Paksa Rela	Rosnaida	TV3	
2017	Cinta Hati Batu	Mega Ariyana	TV3	
2018	Kenyalang I'm In Love	Wanda	TV3	
2019	30 Pesanan Suara	Fatin	TV3	
2019	Iktibar	Arisa	TV3	Episode: "The Pain Behind Desire"
2020	Camelia	Marina	TV3	
2023	My Name Is Lola	Lola	TV3	

=== Telefilm ===
Year	Title	Character	TV Channel	Notes
2017	Personal Shopper	Adik	Astro Ria	First telefilm
2018	My Sweet Madu	Bella	ntv7	
2018	Raya Tina Raya Timah	Tina	TV2	
2019	Suluhkan Aku Cahaya	Dr. Zulaikha	TV3	
2019	Resort Berhantu	Rosalinda	TV3	Special telefilm in conjunction with DFKL 2019
2019	Siti Selfie	Siti	TV2	
2020	Perang Dingin	Dayana	Awesome TV	
2024	Hantu Telekung Kampung Lenggong		Astro Warna	
2024	Hantu Raya Telekung Kampung Lenggong		Astro Warna	

=== Television ===
Year	Title	Role	TV Channel	Notes
2015	Girls Only Show		Unifi TV	
2015	Betul Ke Bohong? (Season 7)	Guest Artist	Astro Warna	Episode 9
2015	Betul Ke Bohong? (Season 8)	Couples Group	Astro Warna	Episode 7
2015	Mad Markets	Host	Go Asean	
2015	Lari: Misi Mr. X	Regular Member	TV3	
2016	Dari Bilik Sebelah (Anugerah Skrin 2016)		TV3	
2016	Red Carpet (2016 Screen Awards)		TV3	
2017	MBuzz	Host	TV3	
2018	Trolley vs Backpackers		TV Okey	
2018	Pop Express	Host	ntv7	
2018	I Can See Your Voice Malaysia (season 1)	Guest artist	ntv7	
2018–2022	Jenaka Kampung Kalut (JKK)	Lola	TV3	
2019	MeleTOP Era Awards 2019	Pre-show host	Astro Ria	co-host Haniff Hamzah
2019	Arena Panggang (Season 2)	Guest	Astro Warna	
2019	J-POP	Host	Astro Warna	co-host Jiggy Masin
2019	Ketuk-Ketuk Ramadan	Guest	TV1	
2019	Muzikal Lawak Superstar	Participants	Astro Warna	with the Titans group
2020	Immortal Songs: Lagu Lama Menyengat Semula	Host	Official Lazada & YouTube App TV3MALAYSIA Official	co-host Fad Bocey & Amy Mastura
2020	Lazada Chief Discount Officer	Host	Official Lazada & YouTube App TV3MALAYSIA Official	
2020	Cannot Brain		Astro Warna	
2021	Lagu Cinta Kita (Season 3)	Host	TV3	co-host Kamal Adli
2021	Anugerah Drama Sangat 2021	Host	TV3	co-host Nabila Huda
2022	I Can See Your Voice Malaysia (season 5)	Host	TV3	co-host Izzue Islam
2022	Karaoke Superstar	Host	Astro Ria	co-host Datuk Aznil Haji Nawawi
2022–present	Melodi	Host	TV3	co-hosted by Haziq Hussni (2023-23) & Fikry Ibrahim (2024-26) & Kamal Adli (2026-present)
2023	35th Daily News Popular Star Awards	Host	TV3	hosting with Johan
2024	Yak Yak Yey!		Astro Warna	

=== Siniar ===
Year	Title	Role	Channel	Notes
2024	Studio Sembang	Herself with husband	YouTube	Guest artist; Episode: "Family First, Tiktok Later"; Hosted by Amelia Henderson

== Awards and nominations ==
Year	Award	Category	Recipient/Nominated work	Results
2016	Zalora Style Awards 2016	Female Style Star	Herself	Won
2018	31st Berita Harian Popular Star Award	Popular Female New Artist	Herself	Nominated
2023	35th Berita Harian Popular Star Award	Popular TV Host	Herself	Nominated

== Discography ==
Single
Year	Song title	Singer
2020	"Overthink"	Akwa Ariffin
2025	"Balik Kampung... Gosip Raya"	Sherry Alhadad & Ain Edruce
