= Zara Zya =

Malaysian actress (born 1985)

- Born: Zainurul Razia binti Mohd Zainuddin; 22 October 1985 (age 40); Lenggong, Perak, Malaysia
- Status: Single
- Education: Akademi Seni Warisan Negara (ASWARA)
- Occupations: Actress; Host Television; Model; Singer
- Years active: 2011–present

Zainurul Razia Mohd Zainuddin (born 22 October 1985) or better known as Zara Zya (Jawi: زار زيا) is a Malaysian actress, host and singer. She first became known through the drama Love You Mr. Arrogant which was paired with Azlee Khairi.

== Early life ==
She was born on 22 October 1985 as Zainurul Razia binti Mohd Zainuddin in Lenggong, Perak. Zara received her education in the field of theater from Akademi Seni Warisan Negara. She is the youngest of 4 siblings.

== Career ==
Zara has actually been active in the acting field for a long time, but she did not play a prominent main role like her contemporaries, Zara once joined Dewi Remaja in 2005. Before that, she had acted in the VCD Drama Version in 2002 titled HISTERIA by playing the role of Aminah, A student in the Chemistry Science class who had long since died due to an explosion in the science laboratory, her spirit was still lingering. Then she had the opportunity to play the main role in the drama series Love You Mr. Arrogant which was adapted from the novel same title by Aliesha Kirana. This drama was broadcast through Slot Akasia on TV3. The drama directed by Eoon Shuhaini has recorded around 4.6 million viewers.

Zara's popularity increased when she won many awards through MeleTOP Era Awards, KL Festival Drama Awards and ABPBH 2012. Since then, many people have opened their eyes to her abilities and allowed Zara to get various offers from various drama and film productions. Apart from being active in the field of acting, Zara Zya is also active in running a tudung, biscuit and sambal business which can be purchased online through her Instagram account. Zara Zya also has a fan club established by her fans, namely Love Zara Zya FC.

In 2017, Zara appeared in the drama titled Kerana Anisa which was broadcast in Slot Samarinda on TV3. She played the main role, paired with Mustaqim Bahadon, Fahrin Ahmad and Sura Sojangji as well as other famous artists. On 11 March 2017, Zara appeared in a telefilm in conjunction with the Kuala Lumpur Drama Festival titled Trauma; playing the role of Haneem. This telefilm also starred Janna Nick, Saharul Ridzwan, Idris Khan and Dayana Roza and was broadcast on TV3.

== Personal life ==
In April 2018, Zara entered into a relationship with actor Hafreez Adam and she did not see the age gap as a barrier. On 12 October 2019, Zara and Hafreez announced their engagement and planned to get married in 2020. Zara and Hafreez announced that they had called off their engagement a month later.

In 2020, she started wearing a hijab. In her free time, Zara has a hobby of caring for cats.

== Filmography ==
=== Movies ===
Year	Title	Character	Notes
2012	Azura	Siti	First Film
2015	Rembat	Azira	

=== Drama ===
Year	Title	Character	TV channel	Notes
2002	Bilik No. 13	Psikiatri	TV2	First drama
2011	Supermak	Camelia	TV2	TV3
2012	3 Janji	Ani		TV3
2013	Puteri Malam	Puteri	TV9	
2013	Delina	Naufah	TV3	
2013	Mencintaimu		TV2	
2013	Love You Mr. Arrogant	Zaara Amirah	TV3	
2013	Cikgu Kemisah Kirkby		TV2	
2014	Tanah Kubur (Season 10)	Munah	Astro Oasis	Episode: "Kejamnya Santau"
2014	Zahira	Zahira	TV3	
2015	Kasih Malisa	Malisa	TVi	
2015	HidayahMu Ramadan	Hidayah	TV3	
2015	Tanah Merah	Hana	NTV7	
2015	Tuan Anas Mikael	Ayu Maisarah	Astro Ria	
2016	Kifarah Mistik	Sakinah	TV3	Episode: "Malar Hitam"
2016	Cinta Hati Abah	Intan	TV3	
2016	Duda Terlajak Laris	Pehah/Inas	TV3	
2016	Tuan Anas Mikael: 5 Hari Beraya	Ayu Maisarah	Astro Ria	
2016	Cinta FB	Emelda	Unifi TV	
2017	Kerana Anisa	Anisa	TV3	
2017	Kias Ramadan	Safura	TV3	Episode "Merisik Kasih"
2017	My Sweet Lavender	Laila/Leha	TV9	
2018	Monalisa	Melisa	Astro Prima	Korean adaptation of the drama Two Women's Room
2018	Terbaik Dariku	Aisyah	TV3	
2019	PIA	Pia	TV3	
2019	Calon Menantu Tuan Rumah	Anis	TV Okay	
2020	Alergi Mamat Romantik	Nurul Kaisara	TV Okay	
2020	Seadanya Aku	Aufiya	TV3	
2020	Korban Kasih	Fatimah	TV1	
2020	Beri Sedikit Waktu	Hananiah	TV3	
2021	Jom Mak, Raya KL!	Aida	TV3	
2021	Single Terlalu Lama	Herself	TV3	Special appearance
2021	Lockdown	Ina	Astro Ria	
2021	Mr. Bibik	Aulia Izzatunnisa	TV3	
2022	Risik Pada Hati	Aisya	TV3	
2022	Honey-Moon	Moon	TV3	
2023	Derhaka Sebuah Cinta	Dahlia	Astro Ria	
2023	Misteri Flat Kirana	Ijah Bekeng	TV3	
2023	Segenap Takdir	Nadira	TV3	
2023	Hati Tercarik Luka	Eyda Amanda	TV3	
2024	Kampung Puasa	Che Well	TV3	Cheerful Astro
2024	Helo, Saya Anak Uncle!	Teacher Wawa	TV3	
2025	Dia Imamku	Lily	Astro Ria	
2025	Sumpah Ibuku	Syafiqah	TV3	Watak Antagonis utama pertama
2026	Mencari Isteri Sempurna	Zara	Astro Prima	
2026	Luka di Hujung Setia	Dhia	TV3	

=== Telefilm ===
Year	Title	Character	TV channels
2002	Histeria	Amen	VCD
2009	"Bujang Sepah Silalitamplom"		Astro Prima
2010	3 Budak Botak 2 Hari Di Hari Raya		Astro Warna
2010	Suaramu		TV1
2010	Selipar Jepun Malaysia	Dina	Astro Prima
2011	Kenduri Sakan		TV1
2012	Janji Kita		TV9
2013	Dari Ibu	Suraya	TV3
2014	Bila Joyah Goyah	Syikin	TV9
2014	Kekasih Upahan: Kontrak Cinta	Shahira	TV2
2014	Mencari Datin	Maria	TV9
2014	Love You Mr Arrogant Raya	Zaara Amira	TV3
2014	Man Rider	Fatamorgana	TV3
2014	Jalan Singkat ke Syurga	Aida	Astro Oasis
2015	Temukan Aku Pada Ramadhan	Rabiatul	TV1
2015	Isteriku Bukan Tukang Masak	Nur	Astro Prima
2015	Sut Putih	Siti	TV9
2015	Minah Gangster	Nina	Astro Ria
2015	Travelling Beruang	Lisa	TV3
2016	Hujan Malam Itu	Shuhadah	TV1
2016	Muazzin	Dr. Hawa	TV9
2016	Jatu Cinta Buta	Zulin	Astro Ria
2017	Takdir Yang Terhenti	Raudah	TV3
2017	Cupid	Sara	Astro Citra
2017	Trauma	Haneem	TV3
2017	Huru Hara Raya	Ayu	TV3
2017	Jenayah Cinta	Liyana	TVi
2017	Projek Kuih Raya Mak Leha	Bella	TV9
2017	Kamal Kamalia	Kamalia	TV2
2018	3 Hati Ibu	Zaidah	TV2
2019	Derita Pia	Pia	TV3
2019	Insan Terpilih	Mastura	TV3
2019	Aku Belum Mahu Mati	Maria	TV3
2020	Mencari Nur	Nur	TV1
2020	Aku Tak Gila	Balqis	Astro Citra
2021	Mache Fusion	Fatima	Awesome TV
2023	Misi Adeena	Maya	TV2
2025	Duri Cinta Bisu	Haya	TV1

=== Web drama ===
Year	Title	Character	TV Channel	Notes
2015	Dan Calonnya Adalah (Season 2)	Fatin	Tonton	
2019	KOPI: "Secangkir Kopi Bersama Dia"	Si Dia	Tonton	
2024	Menanti Yang Pasti	Siti	Tonton	
2026	Namamu Cinta	Nuna	Tonton	

=== Television ===
Year	Title	As	TV Channel
2013	Wanita Hari Ini (episode 193) - Drama promotion	Guest	TV3
2013	9 Soalan ft Zara zya	Guest	TV9
2013	Semi Final Muzik - Muzik ke 28	Special appearance	TV3
2014	Meletop ( Episode 66 ) bersama Azlee Khairi	Guest	Astro Ria
2014	Meletop ( Episode 86) bersama Hafiz Suip	Guest	Astro Ria
2014	Apa saja FBI ( Episode 6 )	Guest	TV3
2015	Wanita Hari Ini (episode 138) - Drama promotion	Guest	TV3
2015	Galaksi ( 2015 ) - Episode 22	Host Guest	TV3
2015	Meletop ( Episode 158 ) - Drama promotion	Guest	TV3
2016	Diari Kilauan Emas Otai	Host	Astro Prima
2018	Super Spontan Xtravaganza	Participant	Astro Warna
2018	Seri Murni Dapur Duet	Participant	TV3
2018	Dapur Panas	Guest	TV3
2019	Wanita Hari Ini ( Siapa lebih obsessed diet : lelaki @ wanita) - EP 10	Guest	TV3
2020	Sedapur bersama Zara Zya	Host	Naura HD
2020	Studio Drama Sangat - Seadanya aku	Guest	TV3
2020	Masak Apa Tu ? - Haziq Hussni × Puteri (Ep 3)	Host	TV3
2020	Wanita Hari Ini - Bazaar Ramadan Online : Zarazya Cooks	Guest	TV3
2020	Lagu Cinta Kita 2 - EP3	Guest	TV3
2022	Dapur Panas - EP3	Guest	TV3
2022	Melodi - Drama Promotion	Guest	TV3
2022	Di sebalik tabir : Risik Pada Hati	Herself	TV3
2023	Di sebalik tabir : Segenap takdir	Herself	TV3
2023	Di sebalik tabir : Misteri Flat Kirana	Herself	TV3
2024	Di sebalik tabir : Hello , saya anak uncle!	Herself	TV3
2025	Di sebalik tabir : Sumpah Ibuku	Herself	TV3
2026	Di sebalik tabir : Luka di Hujung Setia	Herself	TV3
2026	Nasi Lemak Kopi O - Drama promotion (9 July)	Herself	TV9

=== Theater ===
Year	Title
	Dan 3 Dara Terbang Ke Bulan
	Lorong Neraka
	Dari Bintang Ke Bintang

== Videography ==
Music video
Year	Song	Artist	Record Company	Notes
2013	"Tetap Menantimu"	Nomad	Indigital Music Sdn Bhd	for the OST of the drama Love You Mr. Arrogant
2020	"Seadanya Aku"	Ippo Hafiz	MVM Production	for the OST of the drama Seadanya Aku
2023	"Sampai Bila"	Shaffy	Rocketful Network	
2023	"Biarku Pergi"	Voice of Men		
2024	"Cinta Agung"	Zara zya & Alha Alfa		
2025	"Terpatri Cinta"	Zara zya		

== Discography ==
- Tiada Dendam (2018)
- Hentian Ini (2018)
- Hati Yang Rapuh (2018)
- Galau (2019)

== Awards and nominations ==
Year	Award	Category	Nomination	Results
2014	MeleTOP Era Awards	Top MeleTOP Artist (Female)	—N/a	Won
2014	MeleTOP Era Awards	New MeleTOP Artist	—N/a	Won
2014	MeleTOP Era Awards	MeleTOP TV Star	Love You Mr. Arrogant	Nominated
2014	Kuala Lumpur Festival Drama Awards	Choice Female Drama Actress	Love You Mr. Arrogant	Nominated
2014	Kuala Lumpur Festival Drama Awards	Choice Hero-Heroine (with Azlee Khairi)	Love You Mr. Arrogant	Won
2014	Kuala Lumpur Festival Drama Awards	Choice Cast Lineup	Love You Mr. Arrogant	Nominated
2014	Kuala Lumpur Festival Drama Awards	Choice Actress	Puteri Malam	Nominated
2014	Kuala Lumpur Festival Drama Awards	Choice Hero & Heroine (with Hafreez Adam)	Puteri Malam	Nominated
2014	Kuala Lumpur Festival Drama Awards	Choice Cast Lineup	Puteri Malam	Nominated
2014	Daily News Popular Star Award 27th	Popular Female New Artist	—N/a	Won
2014	Daily News Popular Star Award 27th	Compatible On-Screen Couple (with Azlee Khairi)	Love You Mr. Arrogant	Won
2015	28th Berita Harian Popular Star Awards	Compatible On-Screen Couple (with Adi Putra)	Zahira	Nominated
2016	3rd MeleTOP Era Awards	MeleTOP Actor	Tuan Anas Mikael	Nominated
2016	3rd Kuala Lumpur Drama Festival Awards	Choice Actress	Hidayahmu Ramadan	Nominated
2016	3rd Kuala Lumpur Drama Festival Awards	Choice Couple (with Aeril Zafrel)	Hidayahmu Ramadan	Nominated
2016	Online Choice Award	Best Online Choice Actress	—N/a	Nominated
2016	Malaysian Film Festival 28th	Best New Female Actress	Rembat	Nominated
2016	Telenovela Awards	Best Female Actress	Tuan Anas Mikael	Won
2016	Telenovela Awards	Popular Female Actress	Tuan Anas Mikael	Nominated
2018	2017 Berita Harian Popular Star Awards	Popular Female TV Actress	—N/a	Nominated
2019	2019 Screen Awards	Best Female Actress in a Chain Drama	Pia	Won
