= Zulin Aziz =

Malaysian actress (born 1989)

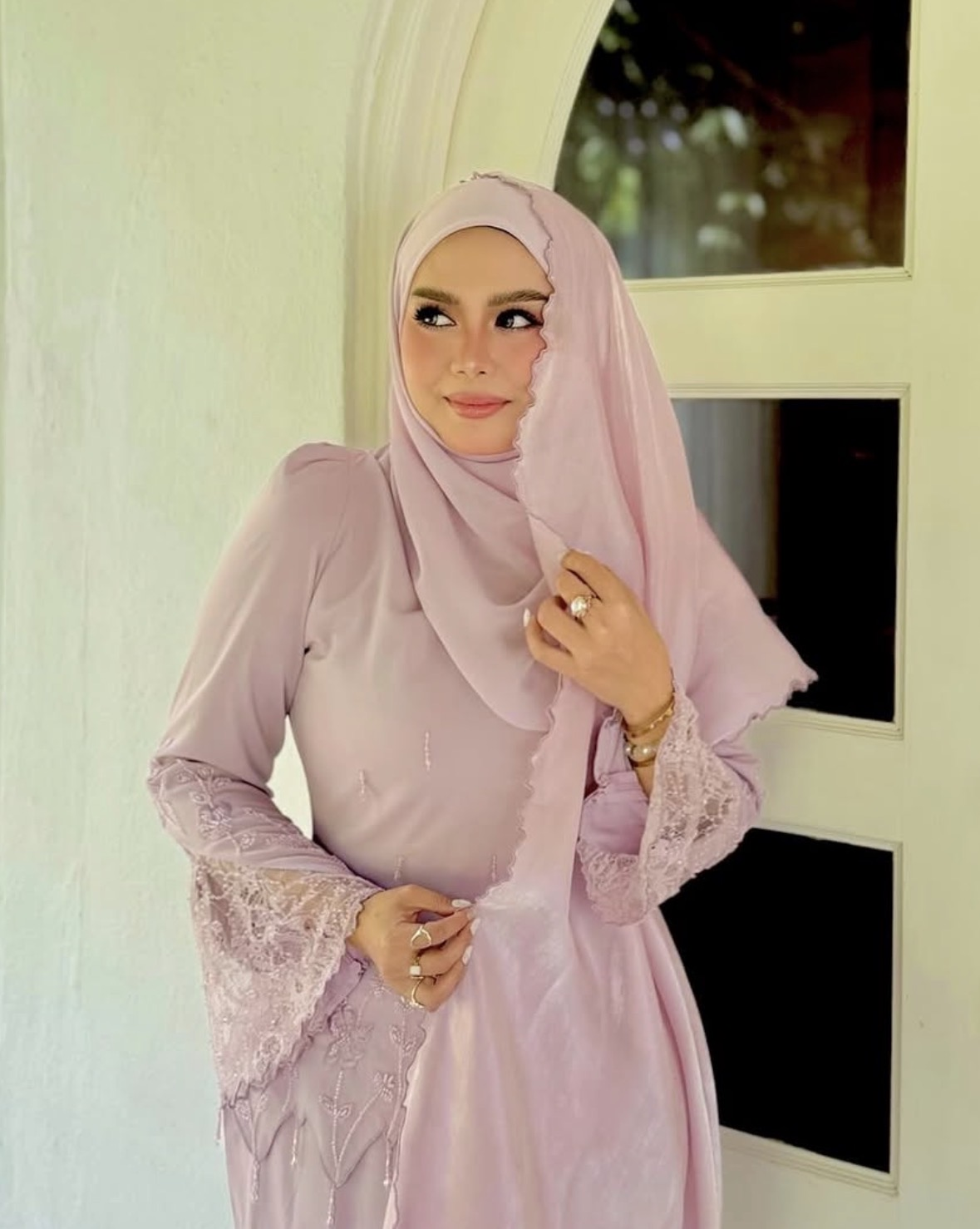
- Born: Farah Azleenda binti Abdul Aziz; 26 November 1989 (age 36); Kuala Lumpur, Malaysia
- Occupations: Actress; Comedian; Host Television; Radio Presenter; Singer
- Years active: 2009–present
- Employer: Star Media Radio Group (2016-18)
- Spouse: Farhan Norzaini (m. 2022)
- Parents: Abdul Aziz Jaafar (father); Siti Aminah Abdullah (mother)

Farah Azleenda Abdul Aziz or better known as Zulin Aziz (born 26 November 1989) is a Malaysian actress, comedian, host, singer and radio presenter. She is an alumnus of Pilih Kasih season one and a radio presenter on Suria FM.

== Career ==
Zulin Aziz began his acting career in 2009 after his talent was discovered by Datuk Rosyam Nor through the first season of the talent search show, Pilih Kasih where he was one of the 20 finalists.

Zulin's first television drama appearance was Begitukah Cinta starring Nazim Othman and Ainul Aishah which aired on TV3 in 2011. She was offered by director Shamyl Othman to star in the film Rembat starring Zizan Razak and Shaheizy Sam; Zulin played the role of Didie. The film was released on 8 October 2015.

Zulin began his music career in 2017 by releasing his debut single titled "Terbiar" which is a bossa ballad genre composed by Aiyad Sakti and Ijoo Omar. Followed by the second single, "Keliru" which was released in February 2018.

Since July 2016, he has been a radio presenter on Suria FM. Zulin is among the new presenters who have been absorbed into Suria including Fizi Ali and Suraya Borhan. Zulin plays the role of Mira Edora Senrose in the film 2016 action comedy suspense, Bo-Peng starring Nabil Ahmad and Johan As'ari.

== Personal life ==
Zulin was born and raised in Kuala Lumpur. He is a former student at Sekolah Menengah Kebangsaan Taman Desa, Bandar Country Homes. In March 2018, he revealed on his Twitter account that he was a victim of abuse by his own maid during his childhood.

Zulin has an adopted daughter named Puteri Eryna Amanda who is also the daughter of his best friend who also serves as his personal assistant.

In January 2018, she expressed regret when she was called a 'Bad Malay Woman' by an unknown woman because of her statement in the article 'Zulin tak kisah bermadu' published in the newspaper Harian Metro.

In December 2017, Zulin was diagnosed with cyst disease after complaining of stomach pain and diarrhea.

On 20 February 2022, Zulin legally became the wife of Farhan Norzaini who is her business partner.

== Filmography ==
=== Films ===
Year	Title	Character	Notes
2013	Penanggal	Rokiah	First film
2014	MTB: Missi Tawan Baby		
2015	Rembat	Didie	
2016	Bo-Peng	Mira Edora Senrose	
2017	Minah Moto	Dekan	
2023	Polis EVO 3	Mimi	Special appearance

=== Drama ===
Year	Title	Character	TV channel	Notes
2010	Pasukan Gerakan Marin	Amira	TV9	First drama
2011	Begitukah Cinta	Roza	TV3	
2012	Mimpi Cinderella	Siti	TV3	
2013	Misiku Kuza	Nurse	Astro Ria	Guest actor
2013	Hanya Padamu	Rockie	TV3	
2013	Fira Ayuni	Nurin	TV3	
2013	Ramadan Yang Hilang	Ayu	TV3	
2015	Suamiku Sebelah Rumah	Dr. Wani	TV3	
2015–2016	Cik Cinderella And Encik Tengku	Jee	TV3	
2017	Nahu Rindu	Dina	TV3	
2021	Penjara Janji	Zulaikha	TV3	
2023	From Saga With Love	Suhaila	Viu	

=== Telefilm ===
Year	Title	Character	TV Channel
2011	Pontianak Beraya Di Kampung Batu	Leha	Astro Ria
2013	Racun Ibu	Young Rohani	TV3
2015	Bedah vs Joyah		TV9
2015	Aku Mahu ke New York 1	Cikgu Nora	Astro Ceria
2015	Aku Mahu ke New York 2	Cikgu Nora	Astro Ceria
2016	Cik Cinderella dan Encik Tengku Raya	Jee	TV3
2017	Alamak		TV9
2017	Cekelat Semanis Honey	Jiha	Astro Citra
2018	Cekelat Tak Semanis Honey	Jiha	Astro Citra
2018	My Sweet Madu	Intan	NTV7
2021	Janda Si Ayob	Zaleha	Awesome TV
2022	Sabotaj Raya	Elina	TV1
2024	Jodoh Geng G	Santi	Astro Warna
2024	Hajah Noraini's Son-in-law		TV1

=== Television ===
Year	Title	Role	TV Channel	Notes
2021	Apa Nak Masak Ni	Guest Artist	TV3	
2021	Betul Ke Bohong? Kuasa 2	Guest Artist	Astro Warna	Episode 2

=== Participants ===
Year	Title	Group
2009	Pilih Kasih (Season 1)	
2016	Super Spontan 2016	Monyet Mafia
2017	Perang Bibir	
2019	Muzikal Lawak Superstar (season 1)	Tamanz
2024	Muzikal Lawak Superstar (season 4)	Zuara

| Muzikal Lawak Superstar (season 5) | Kimbab

== Radiography ==
=== Radio ===
Year	Title	Station
1 July 2016 – 24 June 2018	"Suria Pagi"	Suria

== Discography ==
Single
Year	Title
2017	"Terbiar"
2018	"Keliru"
2018	"Dan Ketika Itu"
2019	"Jadikan Aku Yang Halal"

== Awards and nominations ==
Year	Award	Category	Results
2009	Pilih Kasih	—N/a	Finalist
2018	2017 Berita Harian Popular Star Award	Popular Versatile Artist	Nominated
