= Haziq Hussni =

Malaysian radio presenter

- Born: Muhammad Haziq Irfan bin Mohd Hussni; 11 December 1990 (age 35); Kuala Lumpur, Malaysia
- Education: Bachelor of Business Administration
- Occupations: Radio Presenter; Host Television; Actors
- Years active: 2014–present
- Employers: Media Prima Audio (2014-22); Astro Radio (since 2024)
- Spouse: Ayunda Putri Mekarsari (m. 2016)
- Children: 3

Muhammad Haziq Irfan Mohd Hussni' (born 11 December 1990) is a Malaysian male radio presenter and host. He started as a radio presenter on Hot FM from 2014 to 2022. He is now a radio presenter on Era since 2024. He also began appearing as a TV host in 2014.

== Personal life ==
On 15 July 2016, Haziq married Ayunda Putri Mekarsari. Haziq and Putri have so far been blessed with 3 children, namely Muhammad Heidy Nufael on 7 April 2017, Chayra Auliya on 30 August 2018 and Charissa Azzahra on 25 May 2022.

== Radiography ==
=== Radio ===
Year	Title	Station
October 2014 - 10 June 2022	Hot FM Zon, Hot FM Jam, Geng Pagi Hot, Mega Hot, Jam Hot & Sembang Squad	Hot FM
12 August 2024 – present	Petang Era	Era
March 2025 - 4 April 2025	3 Pagi Era	Era

== Filmography ==
=== Web drama ===
Year	Title	Character	Network	Notes
2025	Gadis Masa	Lepat	Viu	First drama

=== Television ===
Year	Title	As	TV Channel	Notes
2014–2022	Hot TV	Host	TV3	
2015	Jangan Gelak	Host	TV9	
2015	Kaki Bola	Host	TV9	
2016	Menjelang Anugerah Skrin 2016	Host	TV3	
2016–2017	Moreh	Host	TV3	
2016–2018	Nasi Lemak Kopi O	Host	TV9	
2017–2018	Carocks Pop TV	Host	NTV7	
2017–2021	Muzik Muzik	Host	TV3	co-hosted Sherry Alhadad
2018	Debaran Anugerah Juara Lagu 32	Host	TV3	
2018	Mentor Otai	Host	TV3	co-hosted Elly Mazlein
2018	Lazada 11.11 Supershow	Host	TV3	
2018–2022	Borak Kopitiam	Host	TV3	
2018–2020	KLTV	Host	Hypp Sensasi	co-hosted with Aishah Azman
2020	34th Song Champion Awards	Host	TV3	co-hosted with Sherry Alhadad & Awal Ashaari
2021	35th Song Champion Awards	Host	TV3	co-hosted with Sherry Alhadad & Awal Ashaari
2021	Famili Duo (Season 1)	Celebrity couple	TV3	with her husband
2021	Havoc Nak Raya	Host	TV3	co-hosted with Sherry Alhadad
2022–2024	Malaysia Hari Ini	Host	TV3	
2022–2023	Melodi	Host	TV3	co-host with Ain Edruce
2022	Terpaling Juara	Host	TV3	co-host with Shiha Zikir
2024	The Chosen One (Season 2)	Host	Astro Ceria	co-host with Jihan Muse
2024–present	Borak SeeNI	Host	Astro Prima	
2024–present	Gempak Most Wanted	Host	Astro Ria	
2025–present	MeleTOP	Guest Host	Astro Ria	

== Awards and nominations ==
Year	Award	Category	Results
2018	31st Daily News Popular Star Award	Popular TV Presenter	Nominated
2018	31st Daily News Popular Star Award	Popular Radio Presenter	Won
2023	35th Daily News Popular Star Award	Popular TV Presenter	Nominated
