= Shuk Sahar =

Malaysian comedian, actor and host

- Born: Mohamad Shukri bin Mohamed Sahar; 20 March 1986 (age 40); Penang, Malaysia
- Other name: Shuk Sahar
- Occupations: Comedian, actor, host, radio presenter
- Years active: 2011–present
- Employer: Media Prima Audio (2017-21)

Mohamad Shukri bin Mohamed Sahar (born 20 March 1986) or better known as Shuk Sahar and Shuk Balas is a Malaysian comedian, host and actor. He was a participant in Raja Lawak Season 5.

== Career ==
Sahar joined the Raja Lawak comedy television show season 5 with Fendi, through the Balas group. On the night of the final stage the Balas group lost to Man.

== Personal life ==
On 20 December 2015, Sahar was married in Kampung Ulu Sapi, Beluran Sandakan, Sabah.

On 30 October 2016, Sahar's wife gave birth to a daughter.

== Filmography ==
=== Film ===
| Year | Title | Role | Notes |
|---|---|---|---|
| 2012 | Adnan Sempit 2 | Fendi | First movie |
| 2012 | Salam Cinta | Shuib | |
| 2012 | Halim Munan | Pawi | |
| 2014 | Zombie Kilang Biskut | Kusyairi / Abang Din Mamu | |
| 2014 | Amir dan Loqman Pergi ke Laut | Amir | |
| 2014 | Mana Mau Lari | Kapten | |
| 2015 | Rumah Pusaka Di Simpang Jalan | Johar Zulkifli | |
| 2015 | Suamiku Jatuh Dari Langit | Mus | |
| 2015 | Jejak Warriors | Ulat Tiket | |
| 2015 | Keranda Tok Wan Terbang | Husin | |
| 2016 | Zack Kapcai | Ray | |
| 2021 | Jangan Takut: Kau Takut Aku Pun Takut | Leman | |
| 2022 | Kampung Latah The Mummy | Usin Markup | |
| 2022 | Cinta VS Hantu | Ismail | |

=== Dramas ===
| Year | Title | Role | TV channel | Notes |
|---|---|---|---|---|
| 2016 | Joras & Star | | Astro Warna | |
| 2016–2021 | Jenaka Kampung Kalut (JKK) | Kojack | TV3 | |
| 2018 | Ramadan & Hamdan | | TV3 | |
| 2019 | Pop Yeah Yeah | Leman | TV3 | |
| 2021 | Kampong Pisang Bersiri-siri | Orang Minyak | Astro Citra | Episode: "Orang Minyak" |

=== Telefilms ===
| Year | Title | Role | TV channel |
|---|---|---|---|
| 2014 | Rombongan Cik Kiah ke Kelana Jaya | | Astro First Eksklusif |
| 2014 | Ya Habibi | | |
| 2016 | Joras: Van Hj Mursyid | | Astro Warna |
| 2017 | Katakan Tidak Pada Cinta | | |

=== Television ===
| Year | Title | Role | TV channel | Notes |
|---|---|---|---|---|
| 2016 | Aku Kaya, Kau Raya, Barulah Raya! | | | |
| 2016 | Edisi Khas Semasa | | | |
| 2016 | Sape Terer | | | |
| 2017–2018 | Pop! TV | Host | TV9 (2017–2018); NTV7 (2018) | |
| 2018 | Mentor (Season 7) | Host | TV3 | with Nana Mahazan |
| 2018 | Bintang Bersama Bintang 2018 | | TV3 | |
| 2018–2021 | I Can See Your Voice Malaysia | Host | TV3 | with Alvin Chong (2018) & Sean Lee (2019–2021) |
| 2019 | Senang Terhibur | | TV3 | |
| 2019 | Bintang Bersama Bintang 2019 | | TV3 | |
| 2019 | Masak Apa Tu? | | TV3 | |
| 2019 | Mentor Milenia 2019 | Host | TV3 | with Marsha Milan |
| 2020 | Ohsem!!! | | Awesome TV | |
| 2020 | Mic On! (Season 1) | | Awesome TV | |
| 2020–2021 | Shuk Nak Tanya | Host | Awesome TV | |
| 2021 | Lahar Net | Guest | Awesome TV | |
| 2022 | Hard To Heart | Guest | Astro Ria | |
| 2024 | Ubi Superstar Live | | Astro Warna | |

=== Podcast ===
| Year | Title | Channel |
|---|---|---|
| 2024 – June 2024 | OKLETSGO | Ok Lets Go (Singapore) |
| 2024–present | Dols Podcast | Shuib Channel (Malaysia) |

== Radiography ==
=== Radio ===
| Year | Title | Station |
|---|---|---|
| 9 January 2017 – 25 January 2021 | Geng Pagi Hot | Hot FM |
