= I Can See Your Voice Malaysia (Chinese language) =

Malaysian Mandarin-language television game show

- Simplified Chinese: 看见你的声音
- Hanyu Pinyin: Kàn jiàn nǐ de shēng yīn
- Genre: Game show
- Based on: I Can See Your Voice by CJ ENM
- Presented by: Wong Yinyin (1); Wind Lee (1–2); Xiaoyu (1–2)
- Starring: The celebrity panelists (see cast)
- Country of origin: Malaysia
- Original language: Mandarin
- No. of seasons: 2
- No. of episodes: Regular: 23; Special: 2; Overall: 25

Production
- Camera setup: Multi-camera
- Production company: Primeworks Studios

Original release
- Network: 8TV
- Release: 20 August 2017 – 5 February 2019

Related
- I Can See Your Voice franchise

I Can See Your Voice Malaysia (Chinese: 看见你的声音) is a Malaysian Mandarin-language television mystery music game show based on the South Korean programme of the same title, featuring its format where guest artist(s) attempt to eliminate bad singers from the group, until the last mystery singer remains for a duet performance. It first aired on 8TV on 20 August 2017.

== Gameplay ==
=== Format ===
Over the course of three rounds, the guest artist(s) must attempt to eliminate bad singers from a group of six "mystery singers", identified only by their occupation or alias, without ever hearing them perform live. They are assisted by clues regarding the singers' backgrounds, style of performance, and observations from a celebrity panel. At the end of a game, the last remaining mystery singer is revealed as either good or bad by means of a duet between them and one of the guest artists.

=== Rounds ===
==== Visual rounds ====
- s1: The guest artist is given some time to observe and examine each mystery singer based on their appearance. Afterward, a muted video of each mystery singer that reveals only 0.3 seconds of their singing voice is played as an additional hint.
- s2: Each mystery singer is given two different identities as a good and bad singer, with one of them is a real identity.

==== Lip sync rounds ====
- s1: Each mystery singer performs a lip sync to a song; good singers mime to a recording of their own, while bad singers mime to a backing track by another vocalist.
- s2: The mystery singer lip syncs to the good singer's recording, then a bad singer's recording comes in the middle of the performance.

==== Evidence rounds ====
- s1: A proof of each mystery singer's singing ability (i.e. photo, video, certificates, etc.) is shown on the screen. Good singers have own evidences, while bad singers had their evidences fabricated.
- s2: Three random panelists are wearing headphones to listen to a recording of assigned mystery singer that lasts for 15 seconds. Afterward, the panelist defends the mystery singer and convince the guest artist to choose them for a final performance.

== Production ==
=== Development ===
Media Prima Berhad formally acquired the rights to produce separate, multilingual adaptations of I Can See Your Voice in Malaysia, with 8TV for the Mandarin-language counterpart in April 2017 and NTV7 for the Malay-language counterpart in June 2018, with the in-house Primeworks Studios assigning on production duties.

=== Naming ===
The Mandarin translation of I Can See Your Voice (Chinese: 看见你的声音; pinyin: Kàn jiàn nǐ de shēng yīn) is adapted to the Malaysian counterpart, which also comes from a title of a Chinese counterpart itself. Also, the I Can See Your Voice Malaysia subtitle is later used as its own title of the Malay-language counterpart.

== Broadcast history ==
The Mandarin-language counterpart of I Can See Your Voice Malaysia debuted on 20 August 2017.

One month after concluding its first season, 8TV renewed the series for a second season, which premiered on 19 August 2018, accompanying the first season of its Malay-language counterpart on NTV7 that began airing on 4 August 2018. Other episodes also include an encore concert held on Christmas day, and a duo of Nick and Stella Chung playing in a Chinese New Year special that concluded on 5 February 2019.

== Cast ==
The series employs a panel of celebrity "detectives" who assist the guest artists in identifying good and bad mystery singers throughout the game. Along with regular members, guest panelists also appear since the first season. Overall, four celebrities have served as panelists, with their original lineup consisting of Rickman Chia and Orange Tan. Later members who joined the group's duties also include Hoon Mei Sim and Gary Yap — from the 2nd season.

| Designations: |
| Main cast member | H Hosting duties |
| Additional cast member | g# Total games attended, by panelists |

| Cast member | Seasons | |
| Cast member | 1 | 2 |
|---|---|---|
| Wong Yinyin | H | |
| Wind Lee | H | H |
| Xiaoyu | H | H |
| Rickman Chia | 6 | 6 |
| Orange Tan | 5 | 7 |
| Hoon Mei Sim | | 6 |
| Gary Yap | | 6 |

== Series overview ==
| Series | Episodes | Originally released | |
| Series | Episodes | First released | Last released |
|---|---|---|---|
| 1 | 10 | 20 August 2017 | 29 October 2017 |
| 2 | 13 | 19 August 2018 | 18 November 2018 |
| Sp | 2 | 25 December 2018 | 5 February 2019 |

== Episodes ==
=== Season 1 (2017) ===
List of season 1 episodes
| No. overall | No. in season | Guest artist(s) | Player order (Note: It refers to the guest artist(s) that have played in according to their first game; returning guest artists (which also include foreigners or former good singers, with their names displaying in italics) are not counted.) | Original release date |
|---|---|---|---|---|
| 1 | 1 | Z-Chen | 1 | 20 August 2017 |
| 2 | 2 | Namewee | 2 | 27 August 2017 |
| 3 | 3 | Geraldine Gan | 3 | 3 September 2017 |
| 4 | 4 | Nicholas Teo | 4 | 10 September 2017 |
| 5 | 5 | Bell Yu Tian | 5 | 17 September 2017 |
| 6 | 6 | Thomas and Jack | 6–7 | 24 September 2017 |
| 7 | 7 | Fuying & Sam | 8–9 | 8 October 2017 |
| 8 | 8 | Joyce Chu | 10 | 15 October 2017 |
| 9 | 9 | Rynn Lim | 11 | 22 October 2017 |
| 10 | 10 | Victor Wong | 12 | 29 October 2017 |

=== Season 2 (2018) ===
List of season 2 episodes
| No. overall | No. in season | Guest artist(s) | Player order | Original release date |
|---|---|---|---|---|
| 11 | 1 | Michael Wong | 13 | 19 August 2018 |
| 12 | 2 | Janice Tan | 14 | 26 August 2018 |
| 13 | 3 | Danny Koo | 15 | 2 September 2018 |
| 14 | 4 | Linda Chien (Note: Foreign guest artists: Hong Kong — Joyce Cheng and Ruco Chan; Taiwan — Linda Chien) | 16 | 9 September 2018 |
| 15 | 5 | Abin Fang | 17 | 16 September 2018 |
| 16 | 6 | Nichole Lai | 18 | 23 September 2018 |
| 17 | 7 | Penny Tai | 19 | 30 September 2018 |
| 18 | 8 | Shio Yee Quek | 20 | 14 October 2018 |
| 19 | 9 | Henley Hii | 21 | 21 October 2018 |
| 20 | 10 | Joyce Cheng | 22 | 28 October 2018 |
| 21 | 11 | DannyOne (Da.Mon.Ster) | 23 | 4 November 2018 |
| 22 | 12 | Priscilla Abby | 24 | 11 November 2018 |
| 23 | 13 | Ruco Chan | 25 | 18 November 2018 |

=== Specials ===
List of special episodes
| No. | Title | Guest artist(s) | Player order | Original release date |
|---|---|---|---|---|
| 1 | "Christmas concert" | — | — | 25 December 2018 |
| 2 | "Chinese New Year special" | Nick and Stella Chung | 26–27 | 5 February 2019 |
