= Hattan =

Malaysian singer - songwriter, musician , record producer and actor (born 1964)

Yang Hormat Dato Hattan DIMP
- Born: Mohd Shukri bin Shahabudin; 21 December 1964 (age 61); Seri Menanti, Negeri Sembilan, Malaysia
- Occupations: Singer, musician, songwriter, record producer, actor
- Years active: 1983–present
- Musical career
- Genres: Rock kapak, hard rock, blues rock, heavy metal
- Works: Discography; song; musical contribution
- Labels: Warner Music Malaysia; Sony Music Malaysia; Luncai Emas sdn.bhd
- Member of: Pratayuda, FRU

Mohd Shukri bin Shahabudin, known professionally as Hattan, is a Malaysian singer-songwriter, musician and actor. The song "Memburu Rindu", composed by M. Nasir, made Hattan a popular solo singer in early 1991.

== Discography ==
- Nostalgia (1987)
- Hattan (1990/1991)
- Antem (1992)
- Ana Permata Timur (1993)
- Mentor (1994)
- Satu Malaya Dah Tahu (1996)
- Biso Bonar (1998)
- Aku Dan Mentor (2000)
- Palestin: Jangan Menangis (2002)
- Masterpiece (2007)
- Inderawala (2010)

== Awards ==
- Pahang
- Darjah Indera Mahkota Pahang (DIMP) - Dato' (2012)
