= Wani Kayrie =

Malaysian singer and actress (born 2000)

Background information
- Born: 17 March 2000 (age 26); Kuala Lumpur, Malaysia.
- Genres: Pop, and Ballad
- Occupations: Singer, TV Actress, TV Host
- Instrument: Vocal
- Years active: 2010–present
- Labels: Suria Records; Rocketfuel Entertainment

Wani Kayrie is a Malaysian singer and actress. Her entertainment career began after winning the reality TV show Kamilah Bintang on Astro Ceria in 2010. She began to achieve commercial success with her 2015 single, "Jangan Jangan" and currently active building up career through her current successful single, "Cak Cak Cekuk".

== Career ==
Wani started singing at the age of 6. In 2010, she became one of the six contestants in the Astro Ceria children's singing competition, Kamilah Bintang.

She signed a contract deal with Suria Records (SRC), a record label that Siti Nurhaliza was formerly its artist, and then released her debut single, "Jangan Jangan". The song was a hit with a total of 1 million views on YouTube within two months.

Wani represented Malaysia at the World Championship of Performing Arts (WCOPA) which took place in Hollywood, California, United States in July 2012 and 2018. She won 1 gold, 2 silvers, 1 bronze and 1 Hollywood Industry Award. Wani participated in the first season of the Astro Ria's reality show for young singers, Big Stage in 2018. Wani survived the elimination when the permanent judge, Siti Nurhaliza used the power of immunity during the quarter finals of the concert and managed to win fourth place. After Big Stage ended, she expand her career by joining Indonesia's famous TV Show competition, Dangdut Academy Asia 4 and survived until Top 15 from Top 36 contestants.

In 2019, she joined a dancing program by Astro, Dansa dan Sing collaborate with her team, Delitz and won 3rd Runner Up. After the program, she got chosen as Malaysia representative to perform at one of the most Asia's prestige awards show 27th Asian TV Awards in Manila, Philippines (2022) and again at 28th Asian TV Awards (2024) that was held in Ho Chi Minh, Vietnam. Because of this achievement, she was awarded by Top Asia Corporate Ball as Best Emerging Female Singer Award in 2025.

Wani also dabbled in acting when she took her role as Fatin in Melastik Ke Hatimu with her Big Stage counterpart, Andi Bernadee and got known because of her successful character. She also played a minor role as a birthday party guest in the film Manisnya Cinta Di Cappadoccia (2014) directed by Bernard Chauly, starring Fazura and Lisa Surihani when she was a kid. After variety of TV Series that she acted in, she expanded her acting career as a Main Cast in a telemovie Saka Bapak Kau and Tangkis both for Astro Ria.

For hosting career, she started professionally in February 2021, Wani became one of the presenters of the Road To Success show on DidikTV KPM along with Afieq Shazwan and Akhmal Nazri.

In 2023, Wani signed a contract with Rocketfuel Entertainment and came out with the song "Jangan Terlepas Pandang" which was also her first recording with the label after leaving Suria Records. After several years of exploring many genres of music, she chose to make a 'comeback' with an Ethnic Pop music, Cak Cak Cekuk which gives her a huge success. Currently, she released a new song Pulang composed by herself, Iqie Hugh and Aniq Iffat to continue the success of her latest hit single.

=== Big Stage (season 1) ===
List of songs assigned to be performed by her during the Big Stage weekly concert:

Concert	Theme	Song	Original singer	Result
Week 1	Lagu Viral	"Jangan Jangan"	Dirinya sendiri	Survived
Week 2	Lit Throwback	"Akan Ku Tunggu"	Candy	Survived
Week 3	Sama-sama Up	"Sampai Bila" (duet bersama Hael Husaini)	Misha Omar	Survived
Week 4	Tapi Bukan Aku	"Sayang"	Via Vallen	Survived
Week 5	Hot List Digital	"Luluh"	Khai Bahar	Survived
Week 6	Lagu Pilihan Siti Nurhaliza	"Getaran Cinta Di Jiwa"	Liza Hanim	Survived
Week 6	Lagu Pilihan Siti Nurhaliza	"Jampi" (duet bersama Afieq Shazwan)	Hael Husaini	Survived
Week 7 (Semi-finals)	Road To Final	"Crazy In Love"	Beyoncé Knowles	Survived
Week 7 (Semi-finals)	Road To Final	"Nisan Cinta" (duet bersama Siti Sarah)	Jaclyn Victor dan Siti Nordiana	Survived
Week 8 (Final)	Cover Penentuan & Lagu Baru	"Pematah Hati"	Nabila Razali	4th position
Week 8 (Final)	Cover Penentuan & Lagu Baru	"Saat Terindah" (Lagu baru)	Dirinya sendiri	4th position

== Personal life ==
Wani was born in Kuala Lumpur, Malaysia and grew up in Petaling Jaya, Selangor. She received an excellent result of 7As in the Sijil Pelajaran Malaysia (SPM) at the Sri Aman National Girls' School, Petaling Jaya. She is a scholar and a graduate of Foundation in Law and Bachelor of Law & Commerce (Honors) at Management & Science University (MSU) in 2024.

== Discography ==
Single
Year	Title	Notes
2015	"Jangan Jangan"	
2016	"Berteman Saja"	
2016	"Kumbang dan Bunga" (feat. VIRAL)	OST Hikayat Cinta Si Pematah Hati
2017	"Aku Suka Kamu"	
2018	"Saat Terindah"	
2019	"Magika"	
2020	"Aksara Cinta"	
2021	"Jangan Terlepas Pandang"	OST Dukun Diva
2022	"Kamu Kamu"	
2023	"Fajar"	OST Hijrah Jannah
2024	"Aiman Tino"	
2025	"Nyam Nyam Ketupat" (feat. Zizan Razak, Dinda Dania & Miss Alvy)	Raya Song
2025	"Cak Cak Cekuk"	
2026	"Kampung Kita"	Raya Song
2026	"Pulang"	

== Filmography ==
=== Film ===
Year	Title	Character	Notes
2012	Jidin Sengal	Piah	Additional cast
2014	Manisnya Cinta Di Cappadoccia	Tetamu	Additional cast
2025	Saka Bapak Kau	Nelly	Main Cast
2025	Tangkis	Sara	Main Cast

=== Drama ===
Year	Title	Character	TV channel	Notes
2019	Cerita Hantu Asrama	Ara	Astro Prima	
2021	Melastik Ke Hatimu	Fatin	TV3	
2021	Perisik Cinta Tak Diundang	Anida	TV3	
2021	Ratu Ten Pin	Suzana	Astro Ria	
2021	Dayang Senandung	Dayang	TV Okey & TV2	
2021	Tahyul	Fathia	TV3	
2022	3 Nota Cinta	Aini	TV3	
2022	Ratu Ten Pin 2: Shalin	Suzana	Astro Ria	
2022	Pekan Kecil Kampung Terpencil	Kasih	TV1	
2022	Adakah Engkau Menungguku	Tina	TV3	
2023	Melastik Ke Hatimu 2	Fatin	TV3	

=== Television ===
Year	Title	Role	TV channel	Notes
2010	Kamilah Bintang	Participant	Astro Ceria	Champion
2011	Tom Tom Bak	Guest artist	Astro Ceria	Guest Artist
2013	Ceria Superstar 1	Participant	Astro Ceria	'The Impossible Krew'
2018	Big Stage (season 1)	Individual/participant	Astro Ria	3rd Runner Up
2019	The House (S5)	Individual	Astro Ria	
2020	Dansa Dan Sing	Participant	Astro Ria	3rd Runner Up
2020	Big Stage (season 3)	Invited artist		Duet with Dinie Rashid
2020	Nona	Wani	TV3	Invitation Personality
2021	Road To Success	Host	DidikTV KPM	
2022	Famili Duo (season 2)	Celebrity participant	TV3	With Bella Astillah

== Awards and nominations ==
Year	Award	Category	Recipient/Nominated Work	Result
2016	Anugerah MeleTOP Era 2016	MeleTOP New Artist	Herself	Nominated
2016	Anugerah Bintang Popular Berita Harian 2015	Popular YouTube Artist	Herself	Nominated
2018	Anugerah Bintang Popular Berita Harian 2017	Popular Female Singer	Herself	Nominated
2020	Anugerah Bintang Popular Berita Harian 2019	Popular Female Singer	Herself	Nominated
2021	Anugerah Bintang Popular Berita Harian 2020	Popular Female Singer	Herself	Nominated
2023	Malaysia Fashion, Modelling & Pageant Awards	Outstanding Female Entertainment Artists		Awarded
2025	Top Asia Corporate Ball	Southeast Asia's Best Emerging Female Singer		Awarded
