= Janna Nick =

Malaysian actress and singer

- جنة نئ
- Born: Nurul Jannah binti Muner; 1 June 1995 (age 31); Sungai Petani, Kedah, Malaysia
- Occupations: Celebrity; Singer; Host; Film director; Producer
- Years active: 2002–present
- Musical career
- Genres: Pop, R&B
- Years active: 2016–present
- Label: Hikayat Records

Nurul Jannah Muner (born 1 June 1995) known professionally as Janna Nick, is a Malaysian actress, singer, host, director and producer. Starting her career in entertainment, she is known for her roles in television films such as Syurga Nur, Kau Aku Kita, Suami Tanpa Cinta and My Coffee Prince. She began her feature film debut with Kimchi Untuk Awak (2017).

In 2016, Nick began her music career with the release of her debut single, "Mungkin Saja", followed by her follow-up single, "Akan Bercinta"

== Early life ==
Nick was born Nurul Jannah binti Muner on 1 June 1995 in Sungai Petani, Kedah, to a family from Malay, Chinese, Pakistani and Thai descent. She is the second child from four siblings and educated in Sijil Pelajaran Malaysia.

== Career ==
Nick began her acting career with 2012 by playing minor and supporting roles in several telemovie and TV dramas. She got her breakthrough role as Nur Jannah in TV3’s primetime drama Syurga Nur paired with Amar Asyraf. She later starred as Iman Firdaus in Kau Aku Kita aired on the same network, pairing with Saharul Ridzwan, which earn her winning Choice Actress category at the 2016 Drama Festival Kuala Lumpur Awards.

Nick also appeared in Siti Nurhaliza's music video "Mikraj Cinta". In 2016, she released her debut single, "Mungkin Saja". In 2017, she made her feature film debut with Kimchi Untuk Awak which starring Aiman Hakim Ridza and Emma Maembong where she played Zara, one of the movie's main antagonist. Also in the same year, she starred with Fattah Amin in My Coffee Prince, a Malaysian remake of the 2007 South Korean television series, The 1st Shop of Coffee Prince. She also released a song titled "Akan Bercinta" which is her second single.

== Personal life ==
In April 2021, Janna Nick revealed to the media that she was diagnosed with bipolar disorder. She also admitted to having attempted to commit suicide twice during her early teens. In June 2023, she married fellow actor, Dini Schatzmann, in Langkawi, Kedah.

== Filmography ==
=== Film ===
Year	Title	Role	Notes
2016	Kerja Kahwin	Farah	Debut film appearances
2017	Kimchi Untuk Awak	Zara	
2020	Pasal Kau!	Jane	
2021	Selamat Hari X Jadi	Hani	
2022	Juang	Hannah	
2023	Jemputan Ke Neraka	Ivy	

=== Telemovie ===
Year	Title	Role	TV channel	Notes
2012	Cinta Vlog	Rissa	TV9	
2014	Aku Bukan Orang Gaji	Tuty	TV1	
2015	Bejalai	Julia	TV1	
2015	Bila Cinta Berbunga	Amira	TV1	
2015	Sayang Suria	Suria	TV3	
2015	Cinta & Coklat	Sheila	TV1	
2016	Isteriku Miss Sally	Salihah	TV1	
2016	Hilangnya Kasih	Qaisara	TV9	
2016	Anak Ibu Buangan Ibu	Putri Aisyah	TV3	
2016	Mek Kelate	Mek Tie	TV3	
2016	Suami Tanpa Cinta Raya	Ain Syifa	Astro Ria	
2016	Tragedi Duit Raya	Sakinah	Astro Maya HD	
2016	Kau Aku Kita Raya	Iman Firdaus	TV3	
2016	Mat Salleh Sangat	Mimi	TV1	
2016	Gadis Kampung Paling Popular	Maya	TV3	
2016	Tangisan Izara	Raihana	TV3	
2016	Tribute P. Ramlee : Aku dan Dia	Izara	TV1	
2017	Di Pintu Syurga	Jannah	TV3	
2017	Tesis Cinta Untuk B	Bella	TV2	
2017	Trauma	Roza	TV3	
2017	Bobajet	Inspektor Siti	Astro First Exclusive	
2017	Menantu Material	Emilya	Hypp Sensasi	
2018	Enam / 6	Myra	Astro Mustika HD	
2018	Wan Peah Balik Beraya	Mas Ayu	TV3	
2019	Tok Siah	Munirah	Astro Citra	
2019	Dosa Semalam	Khadijah	TV3	
2019	Kisah Seram Hostel	Mayang Sari	Astro Citra	
2020	Tuhan Lebih Tahu Aku	Dayana	TV Okey	
2020	Rahsia Malam Jumaat	Hana	TV3	
2021	Delen	Emily	Astro Citra	Directorial debut
2021	Jeti	—	TV3	As director and producer
2021	Perfect Raya	Aina	Astro Ria	
2021	Misteri Mona : Kuserumu Kembali	Anom	TV3	
2022	Istikharahku	Herself	TV3	
2022	Peti Ais Mak	Mona	Astro Ria	
2022	Secret Admirer	Ira Nazeera	Astro Citra	
2023	London With Love	Fifi	Sooka	As director and producer

=== Television series ===
Year	Title	Role	TV channel	Notes
2012	Ikatan		TV2	
2013	Jodoh 1	Elle	Astro Ria	
2013	Tanah Kubur (Season 8)	Nur	Astro Oasis	Episode: "Minyak Murai Gila"
2013	Syurga Di Wajahmu	Astri	TV1	
2013	Dan Calonnya Adalah	Shai	tonton.my	
2013	Di Penghujung Dendam	Aishah	TV1	
2014	Jodoh 2	Elle	Astro Ria	
2014	Puasa Oh Puasa 1	Cikgu Emma	Astro Ceria	
2014	Kasih Berbisik			
2015	Keluarga Karaoke	Shirley	Astro Mustika HD	
2015	Bila Hati Telah Hitam	Azwa	Astro Oasis	Episode: "Fanatik"
2015	Anak Ke-5	Marina	TV9	
2015	Syurga Nur	Nur Jannah	TV3	
2015	Abang Sado Jemur Kain	Yana	TV3	
2015	Si Montel		Hypp Sensasi	
2015	Terlanjur Mencintaimu	Sofea	TV2	
2015	Kau Aku Kita	Iman Firdaus	TV3	
2016	Anakku Diva	Melati	TV3	
2016	Kopi Sentul Mocha Santorini	Alya	TV1	
2016	Jawatankuasa Kampung Kalut (J.K.K.)	Sweet	TV3	Episode: "Hari Keluarga"
2016	Suami Tanpa Cinta	Ain Syifa	Astro Ria	
2016	2000 km Ke Al-Haram	Inas	TV1	
2016	Biar Aku Jadi Penunggu	Ifaat Hamani	TV3	
2017	Cerita Dari Mastika	Nia	Astro Prima	Episode: "Ratah Janin Sendiri"
2017	Dia	Aira	TV3	
2017	My Coffee Prince	Dani	Astro Ria	
2018	Isteri Untuk Diiktiraf	Ana Julia	TV1	
2018	Janji Arissa	Arissa	Mediacorp Suria	
2018	Semerah Cinta Humairah	Humairah	TV3	
2019	Leftenan Zana	Zana	TV3	
2019	Cari Aku Di Syurga	Lisa	TV3	
2019	Bukan Cinta Aku	Riana	TV3	
2019	Demi Rindumu	Nurhana	Astro Ria	
2019	Diari Tular		TV2	Episode: "Palsukan Culik Untuk Hidup Bebas"
2020	Misteri Mona	Anom	TV3	
2021	Melastik Ke Hatimu	Haura Annisa	TV3	
2021	Marry Me Senorita	Sofiy Leia	Astro Ria	
2021	A.I in Love	Audria	TV1	
2021	Yo Lah Tu!	Eyka	TV3	
2021	Malaysian Ghost Stories	Farah	Astro Ria	Episode: "Pocong"
2021	Malaysian Ghost Stories	Zana	Astro Ria	Episode: "Hantu Public Phone"
2022	Shakira	Shakira	TV3	
2022	Lockdown 2	Lola	Astro Ria	
2023	Bukan Puteri Lindungan Bulan	Larasati Aisya (Lara)	TV3	
2023	Melastik Ke Hatimu 2	Haura Annisa	TV3	
TBA	Melastik Ke Hatimu 3	Haura Annisa	TV3	

=== Television ===
Year	Title	Role	TV channel	Notes
2016	CCTV (Suami Tanpa Cinta Special)	Main Protagonist	Astro Ria	
2016	Pernah Makan Tak?	Guest	TV9	
2016	Ketuk Ketuk Syawal	Guest	TV1	
2016	Sembang Teh Tarik Kaw	Guest	Astro Mustika HD	
2016	Kelab Komedi (Season 2)	Guest	TV9	
2017	Ketuk Ketuk Ramadhan	Guest	TV1	
2018–2021	Melodi	Host	TV3	with Awal Ashaari
2020	Studio Drama Sangat	Host	TV3	
2020	The Masked Singer Malaysia (season 1)	Guest Jury	Astro Warna	Replaced Ella
2021	Banteras Covid-19	Host	TV1	
2022	Sampaikan Raya	Host	TV3	with Andi Bernadee
2022	I Can See Your Voice Malaysia (season 5)	Jury	TV3	
2022	Famili Duo (Season 2)	Host	TV3	with Sean Lee
2023	Famili Duo (Season 3)	Host	TV3	with Izzue Islam
2024	Famili Duo (Season 4)	Host	TV3	with Sharif Zero

== Videography ==
Music video
Year	Song	Artist	Role
2013	"Kayangan"	Hyper Act	
2015	"Mikraj Cinta"	Siti Nurhaliza	Car driver

== Discography ==
=== Single ===
- "Mungkin Saja" (2016)
- "Akan Bercinta" (2017)
- "Gatal" (2022)
- "Mentari Setia" (2022)

== Awards and nominations ==
Year	Awards	Category	Results	Ref.
2016	Anugerah Drama Festival Kuala Lumpur 2016	Choice Actress (Kau Aku Kita)	Won	
2016	Anugerah Drama Festival Kuala Lumpur 2016	Choice Couple (with Saharul Ridzwan)	Won	
2016	29th Anugerah Bintang Popular Berita Harian	Popular Female New Artist	Nominated	
2016	2016 Online Choice Awards	Online Choice Best Actress	Nominated	
2016	2016 Online Choice Awards	DNARS Choice Gorgeous Female	Nominated	
2016	2016 Melodi Awards	Melodi Drama Personality	Nominated	
2016	2016 Melodi Awards	Melodi Sensational Personality	Nominated	
2017	30th Anugerah Bintang Popular Berita Harian	Popular Female TV Actress	Won	
2017	2017 Telenovela Awards	Sensational Actress	Won	
2018	Anugerah MeleTOP Era 2018	Bintang Filem MeleTOP (Kimchi Untuk Awak)	Nominated	
2018	Anugerah Drama Festival Kuala Lumpur 2018	Choice Actress (Biar Aku Jadi Penunggu)	Won	
2018	31st Anugerah Bintang Popular Berita Harian	Popular Female TV Actress	Nominated	
2018	31st Anugerah Bintang Popular Berita Harian	Popular Female Movie Actress	Nominated	
2018	31st Anugerah Bintang Popular Berita Harian	TV Best Couple (with Ashraf Muslim)	Nominated	
2019	Anugerah Drama Festival Kuala Lumpur 2019	Choice Actress (Semerah Cinta Humairah)	Won	
2019	32nd Anugerah Bintang Popular Berita Harian	Popular Female TV Actress	Nominated	
2019	32nd Anugerah Bintang Popular Berita Harian	Popular Host	Nominated	
2019	32nd Anugerah Bintang Popular Berita Harian	Popular Versatile Artist	Won	
2021	34th Anugerah Bintang Popular Berita Harian	Popular Female TV Actress	Won	
2021	34th Anugerah Bintang Popular Berita Harian	Popular Host	Won	
2021	34th Anugerah Bintang Popular Berita Harian	Most Popular Star	Won	
2021	Anugerah Drama Sangat 2021	Best Actress (Misteri Mona)	Won	
2022	Anugerah Stail EH!	Most Stylish Music Video (Gatal)	Won	
2022	23rd Anugerah Industri Muzik	Best Music Video (Gatal)	Won	
