= Sufian Suhaimi =

Malaysian singer (born 1992)

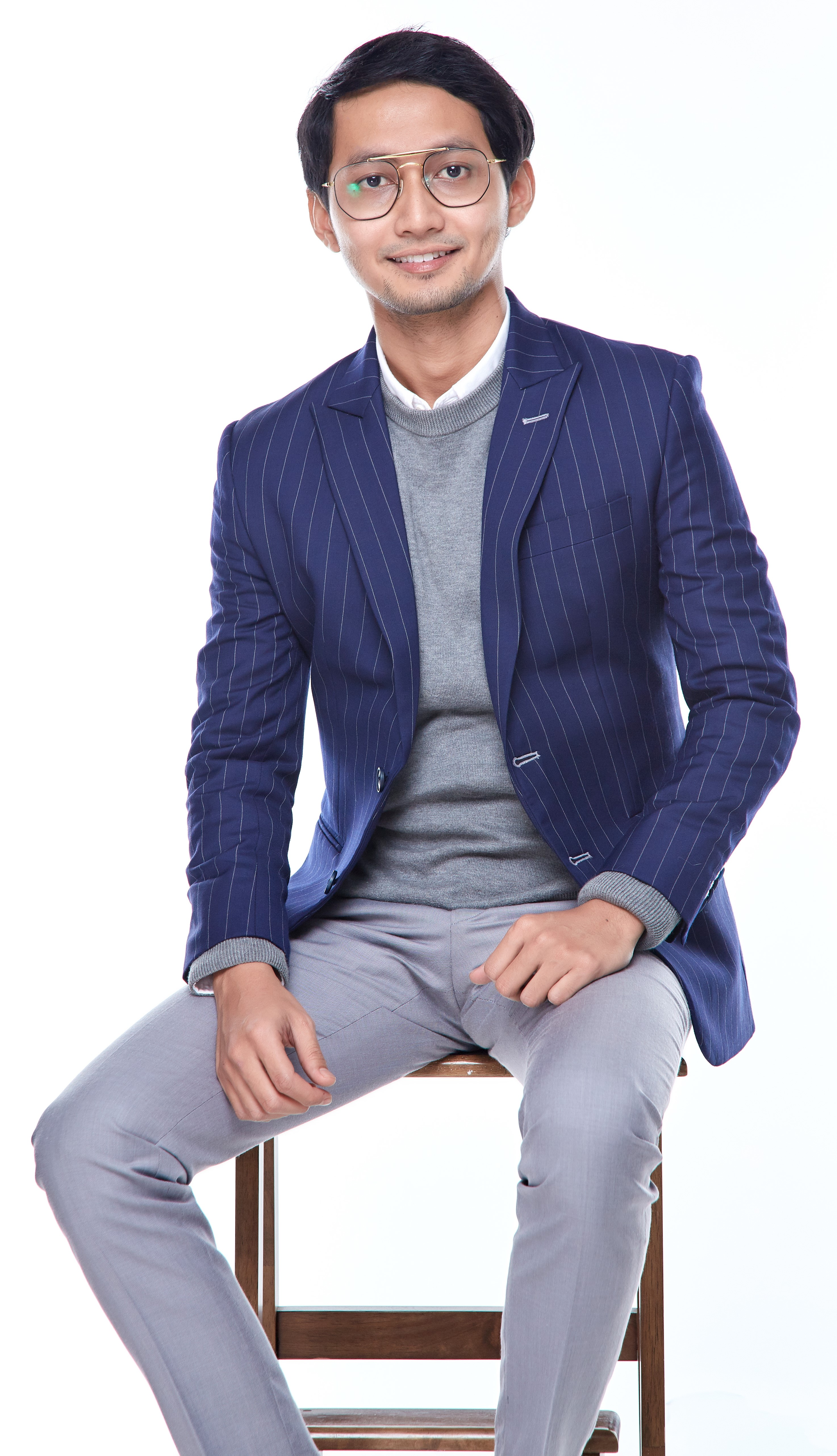
- Sufian Suhaimi in 2021

Background information
- Born: Sufian bin Haji Suhaimi; 3 May 1992 (age 34)
- Origin: Mersing, Johor, Malaysia
- Genres: Pop; R&B; ballad
- Occupations: Singer
- Instruments: Vocals
- Years active: 2016–present
- Labels: Aries Music; Rusa Music
- Spouse: Rania Al Sadat (m. 2025)

Sufian bin Haji Suhaimi (born 3 May 1992) is a Malaysian singer known for his singles "Terakhir", "Di Matamu", and "Mencuba".

"Terakhir" and "Di Matamu" were shortlisted for the Anugerah Juara Lagu, respectively in (AJL31) and (AJL33). Both songs were composed by himself and two friends, Sirkhan and Rinkarnaen.

== Early life ==
Sufian Suhaimi is from Mersing, Johor. His talent in singing developed since he was young and he started to play guitar in secondary school. During his studies in Universiti Sultan Zainal Abidin (UniSZA), he was actively involved in music and joined a musical band, De’ Mahameru. Sufian was an English teacher based in Johor Bahru before venturing into singing professionally.

He holds a Bachelor's degree in English from the Universiti Sultan Zainal Abidin and a master's degree in Mass communication from the Universiti Teknologi MARA, Shah Alam.

== Career ==
=== 2016: "Terakhir" and breakthrough ===
"Terakhir" was composed by Sirkhan since 2012. Sufian, Sirkhan and Rinkarnaen took more than two years to complete the song. The rough cut of the song was recorded equipment he bought with his savings and later uploaded to SoundCloud by Sufian. A fan uploaded the song on YouTube and the song started to gain attention from fans. Few music labels contacted Sufian to sign him as a singer, yet he turned the offers down citing his conflict due to his affinity with rock music. Discussion with Sirkhan led to his decision to accept an offer from a music label and Sufian was signed with Aries Music in early 2016. "Terakhir" was re-recorded and released on iTunes in March 2016. The single received nationwide success and was shortlisted for Anugerah Juara Lagu. Sufian's second single, "Harus Aku" was released in October 2016.

=== 2017–2018: Follow-up singles, Di Matamu, and venture into Indonesian market ===
In August 2017, his third single, "Terasa Ada" was released.

Next, Sufian released "Di Matamu" as his fourth single in March 2018. The single became a commercial success, gaining more than 20 million views on YouTube within two months. "Di Matamu" also peaked atop the RIM International & Domestic Charts for a week and became the most streamed domestic songs for eleven weeks. In January 2019, the official music video for "Di Matamu" became the most viewed Malaysian music video on YouTube after gaining more than 50 million views.

Following the success of "Di Matamu", Sufian re-recorded the song with Indonesian group, Shima for the Indonesian market. The song was re-recorded with new music arrangement and renamed "Di Matamu 2.0". A new video for "Di Matamu 2.0" was shot in Indonesia and released on 23 November 2018.

In its annual look back in music, Spotify reveals that Sufian was ranked second on the list of most streamed Malaysian artistes of 2018.

=== 2019–present: "Mencuba", poetry book, and TRIO concert ===
In April 2019, Sufian released the single, "Mencuba". The music video for the single gained more than 1 million views on YouTube in three days, as well as trending at number 2 on the video-sharing website. Sufian also announced his plans to release a poetry book, written since his days as a student in UniSZA, by the end of the year. The book will be published by Universiti Utara Malaysia.

Sufian, alongside Khai Bahar and Wany Hasrita, held the "TRIO Concert 2019" at Malawati Stadium, Selangor on 2 November 2019.

== Discography ==
=== Singles ===
==== As lead artist ====
Year	Title	Highest position					Notes
Year	Title	Era FM	Hot FM	Muzik Muzik	RIM (International & Domestic)	RIM (Domestic)	Notes
2016	"Terakhir"	1	1	1	–	–	OST Duda Terlajak Laris
2016	"Harus Aku"	7	6	5	–	–	
2017	"Terasa Ada"	14	8	8	–	–	
2018	"Di Matamu"	1	1	1	1	1	
2019	"Mencuba"	6	11	3	–	–	
2020	"Takkan Merubah"	8	6	2	–	–	
2020	"Janji"	4	9	5	–	–	

==== As featured artist ====
Year	Title	Artist	Highest position					Notes
Year	Title	Artist	Era FM	Hot FM	Muzik Muzik	RIM (International & Domestic)	RIM (Domestic)	Notes
2018	"Di Matamu"	SHIMA Band	–	–	–	–	–	

== Concerts and tours ==
=== Malaysia ===
- 2019: TRIO Concert 2019 (with Khai Bahar and Wany Hasrita), Malawati Stadium, Shah Alam, Selangor

== Filmography ==
=== Television ===
Year	Title	Role	TV channel	Notes
2017	Ketuk Ketuk Ramadan 17	Himself (Guest Artist)	TV1	
2017	Nak Raya Dah ?	Himself (Guest Artist)	Astro Raya HD	
2018	Ketuk Ketuk Ramadan 18	Himself (Guest Artist)	TV1	
2019	Bayang	Pyan	TV3	Telefilm in conjunction with the 33rd Anugerah Juara Lagu
2021	Kampung Kolestrol	Adi	TV3	

== Accolades ==
Year	Awards	Category	Nominated work	Result	Ref
2017	Anugerah Juara Lagu	Finalist	Terakhir	Nominated	
2018	Anugerah Planet Muzik	APM Most Popular Song	Di Matamu	Nominated	
2018	Anugerah Bintang Popular	Most Popular Male Singer	Himself	Nominated	
2019	ERA Digital Music Awards (EDMA)	Most Viral Song	Di Matamu	Nominated	
2019	ERA Digital Music Awards (EDMA)	Best Carta ERA Interview	Himself	Nominated	
2019	Anugerah Juara Lagu	Best Performance	Di Matamu	Won	
2019	Anugerah MeleTOP Era 2019	Singer MeleTOP	Himself	Nominated	
2019	Anugerah MeleTOP Era 2019	Song MeleTOP	Di Matamu	Nominated	
2019	The Malaysia Book of Records	Highest Music Video Views on YouTube (Malay) (Note: The song, which was released on 23 March 2018 successfully earned more than 56.485 million views on YouTube.)	Di Matamu	Won	
2019	Herald Global's Asia Awards	Most Admired Leaders – Entertainment	Himself	Won	
2019	Anugerah Bintang Popular	DuitNow Most Popular Male Singer	Himself	Nominated	
2019	Anugerah Bintang Popular	Most "Boom" Song	Di Matamu	Nominated	
