= Akademi Fantasia season 13 =

Akademi Fantasia
- Season 13
- Hosted by: Zizan Razak; Alif Satar; Dahlia Shazwan; Hazeman Huzir; Ck Faizal
- Judges: Dato' Ramli M.S; Dato' AC Mizal
- Winner: Amir Syazwan Masdi
- Runner-up: Muhammad Ammal Shafiq Osman

Release
- Original network: Astro Ria
- Original release: 21 August – 9 October 2016

Season chronology
- ← Previous; Season 12 Next → AF Megastar

The thirteenth season of Akademi Fantasia, also branded as AF2016, premiered on 21 August 2016 and concluded on 9 October 2016 on the Astro Ria television channel. Zizan Razak returned as host along with his new partner, Alif Satar, while Ramli M.S. continued to judge and AC Mizal joined the judging panel following the departure of Rozita Che Wan.

The professional trainers for this season were announced in a press conference for media, which include trainers from previous season, Linda Jasmine, Shahrol, Mas Idayu and Ellie Suriati. AF2015 principal Edry Abdul Halim returned as Music Director, while Shake was announced as the new principal for this season.

On 9 October 2016, Amir Syazwan Masdi was announced as the season's winner, beating Muhammad Ammal Shafiq Osman.

== Audition ==
AF2016 Audition Requirements (Open)

The competition is open to all Malaysians and Singaporeans aged between 18 - 35 years on 1 June 2016. - Participants must be Malaysian and Singaporean citizens and must have an Identity Card (NRIC) or Singapore Identity Card and/or passport. - One copy of Malaysian Identity Card, for Malaysian participants and Singapore Identity Card and/or Singapore Passport for Singapore participants - Two recent 4R size photographs (1 half body, 1 full photograph) from the participant; - One recent passport photo of the participant - Open for Solo performances only.

List of AF2016 Audition Songs Male Participants

1. Love Yourself (Justin Bieber)
2. Hidup dalam Mati (Syamel)
3. Dahsyat (Mojo)
4. Cinta Tak Keruan (Amigos)
5. Pantun Budi (Tan Sri SM Salim)
6. Sudah Ku Tahu (Projector Band)
7. Sampai Mati (Hazama)
8. Potret (Akim & The Majistret)
9. Pawana (Search)
10. Memori Berkasih (Achik Spin & Siti Nordiana)

List of AF2016 Audition Songs Female Participants

1. Flashlight (Jessie J)
2. Anggapanmu (Ziana Zain)
3. Langit Cinta (Dayang Nurfaizah)
4. Sakitnya Tu Disini (Cita-Citata)
5. Joget Sayang Di Sayang (Anita Sarawak)
6. Not For Sale (Stacy)
7. Seluruh Cinta (Dato' Siti Nurhaliza)
8. Pencuri Hati (Ayda Jebat)
9. Permata Pemotong Permata (Ella)
10. Memori Berkasih (Achik Spin & Siti Nordiana)

AF2016 Audition Location

15 – 17 Julai 2016

- The Boulevard – St Giles Premier Hotel, Mid Valley Kuala Lumpur

== Students ==
Ages stated are at time of contest.

Student	Age	Hometown	Ranking
Amir Syazwan bin Masdi (Amir)	20	Selangor	Champion
Muhd Ammal Shafiq bin Osman (Amal)	21	Kuala Lumpur	Runner-up
Kareshma Martin John Patrick (Reshma)	18	Selangor	3rd place
Nur Farrah Izzatie binti Johari (Ara)	19	Negeri Sembilan	4th place
Nurhafizah binti Longkip @ Thomas (Afi)	23	Sabah	5th place
Mohd Afzarul Dzarif bin Mohd Mazlee (Zarol)	21	Johor	6th
Nurul Rahila binti Rashun (Rahila)	20	Singapore	7th
Muhd Ikram bin Kamaruzzaman (Ikram)	26	Kuala Lumpur	8th
Siti Aisyah binti Abdul Razak (Asha)	20	Kuala Lumpur	9th
Jasper James Supayah (Jasper)	23	Johor	10th
Isyariana binti Che Azmi (Riana)	26	Pahang	11th
Zahrul Hilmi bin Badrul Hisam (Emy)	23	Sabah	12th
Halmy bin Hamizan (Halmy)	23	Kuala Lumpur	13th
Mohd Fara Aidid bin Ali Dad Khan (Isa)	23	Selangor	14th
Azarul Rais bin Mansor (Rais)	22	Selangor	15th

== Concert summaries ==
=== Week 1 ===
- Aired date: 21 August 2016
- Theme: Student's Choice
- Guest judges: -

Student	Song	Result
Halmy	"Di Amaran Mama" (Hazama)	Safe
Zarol	"Dikoyak Waktu" (Ronnie Hussein)	Safe
Riana	"Tak Tercapai Akalmu" (Elyana)	Safe
Amir	"Obses" (Akim & The Majistret)	Safe
Ara	"Andaiku Bercinta Lagi" (Mojo)	Safe
Amal	"Takkan Pergi" (Hyper Act)	Safe
Afi	"Percayalah" (Indah Ruhaila)	Safe
Rais	"Inspirasi" (Faizal Tahir & Hafiz Suip)	Safe
Asha	"Mohon Kasih" (Dato' Ahmad Jais)	Safe
Isa	"Terakhir" (Sufian Suhaimi)	Saved
Rahila	"Sudah Ku Tahu" (Projector Band)	Safe
Ikram	"Sejati" (Faizal Tahir)	Bottom 2
Jasper	"Tetap Dalam Jiwa" (Isyana Sarasvati)	Bottom 3
Reshma	"Goyang Inul" (Inul Daratista)	Safe

- Eliminated: No elimination.

=== Week 2 ===
- Aired date: 28 August 2016
- Theme: Throwback
- Guest judges: Juliza Adzlizan

Student	Song	Result
Zarol	"Melodi Hati" (Shawn Bahrin)	Safe
Rahila	"Sedalam Mana Cintamu" (Safura Ya'cob)	Safe
Afi	"Matahari" (Mya Ruslee)	Safe
Halmy	"Ramalanku Benar Belaka" (Umbrella)	Eliminated
Jasper	"Cinta Gila" (Juliana Banos)	Safe
Asha	"Bertakhta Di Hati" (Farahdhiya)	Safe
Isa	"Ketahuan" (Matta)	Eliminated
Ikram	"Kaulah Segalanya" Hazrul Nizam)	Safe
Rais	"Separuh Masa" (The Lima)	Eliminated
Riana	"Flora Cinta" (Min Malik)	Safe
Amir	"Where You Will Go" (The Calling)	Safe
Reshma	"Kembali Lagi Di Sisimu" (Farah Asyikin)	Safe
Amal	"Bintang Kehidupan" (Nike Ardilla)	Safe
Ara	"Andai" (Dia Fadila)	Safe

- Eliminated: Azarul Rais bin Mansur (Rais), Mohammad Fara Aidid bin Ali Dad Khan (Isa) & Halmy bin Hamizan (Halmy)

=== Week 3 ===
- Aired date: 4 September 2016
- Theme: Rock & Etnic
- Guest judges: Awie

Student	Song	Result
Afi	"Kurik Kundi" (Dato' Siti Nurhaliza)	Safe
Asha	"Hangatnya Cinta" (Lyana)	Safe
Ikram	"Hapus Aku" (Nidji)	Saved
Jasper	"Joget Kelantan" (Nora)	Safe
Zarol	"Cinta dan Airmata" (CRK)	Bottom 2
Reshma	"Ex's & Oh's" (Elle King)	Safe
Amal	"Bidadari" (Lela)	Safe
Riana	"Melompat Lebih Tinggi" (Sheila on 7)	Bottom 3
Ara	"Robek Hatiku" (Mas Idayu)	Safe
Rahila	"Dangdut Raggae" (Zaleha Hamid)	Safe
Amir	"Biso Bonar" (Dato' Hattan)	Safe

- Eliminated: No elimination.
- JoHaRa Rockstar: Zahrul Hilmi bin Badrul Hisam (Emy)

Emy was announced as a student absorbed into the Akademi Fantasia. Emy is the winner of the JoHaRa Rockstar karaoke competition on Era FM.

=== Week 4 ===
- Aired date: 11 September 2016
- Guest judges: Adibah Noor

Student	Song	Result
Ikram	"Kekal Bahagia" (Ippo Hafiz)	Safe
Jasper	"Pantas" (Hanie Soraya)	Safe
Afi	"Akustatik" (OAG)	Safe
Ara	"Bimbang" (Goodbye Felicia)	Safe
Emy	"Dekat Tapi Jauh"' (Forteen)	Safe
Reshma	"Langit Cinta" (Dayang Nurfaizah)	Safe
Amir	"Umi" (Dato' Shake)	Safe
Riana	"Tanpa Kekasihku" (Agnez Mo)	Safe
Rahila	"Cinta Sempurna" (Yuna)	Safe
Zarol	"Barakallah" (Maher Zain)	Safe
Asha	"Syurga" (Datin Alyah)	Safe
Amal	"Hang Pi Mana" (Khalifah)	Safe

- Eliminated: No elimination.

=== Week 5 ===
- Aired date: 18 September 2016
- Theme: Tribute / Idol
- Guest judges: Dato' Jamal Abdillah

Student	Song	Result
Rahila	"Antara Hujan dan Airmata" (Dato' Sudirman Arshad)	Safe
Asha	"Penghujung Rindu" (Dato' Jamal Abdillah)	Safe
Amir	"Mahligai Permata" (Dato' Siti Nurhaliza)	Safe
Amal	"Bisikan Asmara" (Dato' Siti Nurhaliza)	Safe
Reshma	"Aku Penghibur" (Dato' Jamal Abdullah)	Safe
Zarol	"Bukan Cinta Biasa" (Dato' Siti Nurhaliza)	Safe
Afi	"Bila Wajahmu Ku Bayangkan" (Dato' Sudirman Arshad)	Safe
Ikram	"Joget Gila Bayang" (Anita Sarawak)	Safe
Ara	"Takdir Penentu Segalanya" (Dato' Jamal Abdullah)	Safe

- Eliminated: Jasper James Supayah (Jasper), Isyariana binti Che Azmi (Riana) & Zahrul Hilmi bin Badrul Hisam (Emy)

Jasper, Riana and Emy were announced as eliminated students this week. However, they were eliminated at the beginning of the concert before they could perform.

=== Week 6 ===
- Aired date: 25 September 2016
- Theme: Medley
- Guest judges: Ogy Dato' Ahmad Daud

Student	Song	Result
Ara	"Nazam Berkasih" (Syura) + "Tinting" (Noraniza Idris)	Safe
Afi	"Kembali Merindu" (Slam) + Pelamin Anganku Musnah" (Azie)	Safe
Zarol	"Mengapa" (Nicky Astria) + "Bayangan Gurauan" (Mega)	Safe
Asha	"Keabadian Cinta" (Anuar Zain) + "Elegi Sepi" (Azharina)	Eliminated
Ikram	"Ratnaku" (Roy) + "Inang Bujang dan Dara" (Illusi)	Eliminated
Rahila	"Di Persimpangan Dilema" (Nora) + "Puncak Kasih" (Ziana Zain)	Safe
Reshma	"Permata Permotong Permata" (Ella) + "Trauma" (Elite)	Safe
Amal	"Masih Jelas" (Hafiz Suip) + "Ke Hujung Dunia" (Siti Sarah)	Safe
Amir	"Misteri Mimpi Syakila" (Wings) + "Dari Sinar Mata" (BPR)	Safe

- Eliminated: Muhammad Ikram bin Kamaruzzaman (Ikram) & Siti Aisyah binti Abdul Razak (Asha)

=== Week 7 (semi-final) ===
- Aired date: 2 October 2016
- Guest judges: Kudsia Kahar

Solo

Student	Song	Result
Rahila	"Cheap Thrills" (Sia)	Eliminated
Afi	"Sangsi Asmara" (Hetty Sarlene)	Safe
Ara	"Samar Bayangan" (Nicky Astria)	Safe
Amal	"The Big Bang" (Rock Mafia)	Safe
Zarol	"Pesan Cinta" (Afgan)	Eliminated
Amir	"Demi Cinta" (Ezad Lazim)	Safe
Reshma	"Hidup Dalam Mati" (Syamel)	Safe

Duet

Student	Guest singer	Song
Rahila	Black	"Senja Nan Merah" (Awie & Ziana Zain)
Afi	Tam Spider	"Dunia Batinku" (Ella & Tam Spider)
Ara	Dato' Hattan	"Tangisan Marhaenis" (Dia Fadila & Dato' Hattan)
Amal	Siti Nordiana	"Memori Berkasih" (Siti Nordiana)
Zarol	Indah Ruhaila	"Di Sebalik Rahsia Cinta" (Metropolitan)
Amir	Datin Alyah	"Ratusan Purnama" (Melly Goeslaw & Marthino Lio)
Reshma	Hazama	"Just Give Me A Reason" (P!nk & Nate Ruess)

- Eliminated: Mohammad Afzarul Dzarif bin Mohammad Mazlee (Zarol) & Nur Rahila binti Rashun (Rahila)

=== Week 8 (final) ===
- Aired date: 9 October 2016
- Guest judges: Dato' M. Nasir

Student	Song	Result
Afi	"Hatinya Tak Tahan" (Noraniza Idris) "Teruskan"; Composer: Omar K Lyric: Hael Husaini	Fifth place
Amal	* "Aku Kejar"; Composer: DJ Fuzz; Lyric: Adik Viral, Alabbas & Yus Z. * "Bukan Diriku" (Samsons)	Runner-up
Ara	"Camar Yang Pulang" (Aishah) "Warkah Untukku"; Composer: Hang Nadim & Laq; Lyric: Hang Nadim & Laq	Fourth place
Reshma	"Sayang Menjadi Benci"; Composer: Edry Abdul Halim; Lyric: Edry Abdul Halim "Bad Romance" (Lady Gaga)	Third place
Amir	"Romantis" (Spring) "Pemilik Cinta"; Composer: Sri Kandi; Lyric: Hang Nadim	Champion

- Champion: Amir Syazwan bin Masdi (Amir)
- Runner-up: Muhammad Ammal Shafiq bin Osman (Amal)
- Third place: Kareshma Martin John Patrick (Reshma)
- Fourth place: Nur Farrah Izzatie binti Johari (Ara)
- Fifth place: Nurhafizah binti Longkip @ Thomas (Afi)

== Elimination ==
Rank	Weekly Concerts							
Rank	Week 1	Week 2	Week 3	Week 4	Week 5	Week 6	Week 7	Week Final
1.	Amir	Amir	Amir	Amir	Amir	Amir	Amir	Amir
2.	Reshma							Amal
3.	Ara							Reshma
4.	Afi							Ara
5.	Asha							Afi
6.	Amal						Zarol	
7.	Rahila						Rahila	
8.	Halmy					Ikram		
9.	Rais		Riana			Asha		
10.	Zarol		Zarol	Jasper	Jasper			
11.	Riana		Ikram	Riana	Riana			
12.	Jasper	Halmy	Emy	Emy	Emy			
13.	Ikram	Isa						
14.	Isa	Rais						

== Elimination chart ==
Rank	Weekly Concerts								
Rank	Students	1 (21/Aug)	2 (28/Aug)	3 (4/Sep)	4 (11/Sep)	5 (18/Sep)	6 (25/Sep)	7 (2/Oct)	Final (9/Oct)
1.	Amir	Safe	Safe	Safe	Safe	Safe	Safe	Safe	1st
2.	Amal	Safe	Safe	Safe	Safe	Safe	Safe	Safe	2nd
3.	Reshma	Safe	Safe	Safe	Safe	Safe	Safe	Safe	3rd
4.	Ara	Safe	Safe	Safe	Safe	Safe	Safe	Safe	4th
5.	Afi	Safe	Safe	Safe	Safe	Safe	Safe	Safe	5th
6.	Zarol	Safe	Safe	Btm 2	Safe	Safe	Safe	Elim	
7.	Rahila	Safe	Safe	Safe	Safe	Safe	Safe	Elim	
8.	Ikram	Btm 2	Safe	Saved	Safe	Safe	Elim		
9.	Asha	Safe	Safe	Safe	Safe	Safe	Elim		
10.	Jasper	Btm 3	Safe	Safe	Saved	Elim			
11.	Riana	Safe	Safe	Btm 3	Saved	Elim			
12.	Emy			AFSerap	Saved	Elim			
13.	Halmy	Safe	Elim						
14.	Isa	Saved	Elim						
15.	Rais	Safe	Elim						

== Cast members ==
=== Host AF Concerts ===
- Zizan Razak
- Alif Satar

=== Host AF Diary ===
- Dahlia Shazwan
- Hazeman Huzir
- CK Faizal

=== Host Terlajak AF ===
- Dato' Aliff Syukri Kamarzaman
- CK Faizal

=== Professional Trainers ===
- Dato' Shake (Principal)
- Edry Abdul Halim (Concerts Music Director)
- Mas Idayu (Performance Arts)
- Linda Jasmine (Choreographer)
- Ellie Suriati (Presentation)
- Shahrol (Vocal)
- Dato' Aliff Syukri Kamarzaman (Motivator & Fashion Advisor)
- Coach Cem (Diet & Nutrition Advisor)

=== Judges ===
- Dato' Ramli M.S
- Dato' AC Mizal
