= Suri Hati Mr. Pilot =

2016 Malaysian television series

- Genre: Melodrama; Romance; Drama
- Based on: Suri Hati Mr. Pilot by Dyla Dyna
- Written by: Fairul Nizam Ablah; Mamu Vies
- Directed by: Hadith Omar; Michael Ang
- Creative director: Andalusia
- Starring: Fattah Amin; Neelofa; Ben Amir; Eleena Sui
- Opening theme: Selamanya Cinta - Alif Satar & Shila Amzah
- Ending theme: Selamanya Cinta - Alif Satar & Shila Amzah
- Country of origin: Malaysia
- Original language: Malay
- No. of episodes: 16

Production
- Executive producers: Richard Lim; Pauline Chin; Michael Ang
- Producer: Michael Ang
- Running time: 42 Minute
- Production company: Cube Film Sdn. Bhd.

Original release
- Network: Astro Ria
- Release: 10 October – 3 November 2016

Related
- Suri Hati Mr. Pilot Raya

Suri Hati Mr. Pilot (English: My Beloved Mr. Pilot) is a 2016 Malaysian television series starring Neelofa, Fattah Amin, Eleena Sui and Ben Amir based on a novel written by Dyla Dyna. This series was aired in MegaDrama slot on Monday to Thursday from October 10, 2016, to November 3, 2016, at 10 pm in Astro Ria. The first episode of this drama managed to get 5.5 million views and the highest record in the history of drama performance in Malaysia.

== Synopsis ==
Tells the story of a meeting between Ejaz (Fattah Amin), Mr. Pilot and Warda (Neelofa) to reopen the worksheet story two years ago. The events that led to Warda family thrown on his own stupidity that is so obsessed with Muslim love. The shakes were present for Ejaz frantic life and self Warda. Ejaz pushed jealous with the presence of Daniel Sein who also keeps a special feeling in Warda. Finally he refused to marry Warda. Marriage built beginning to raise seed of love in their hearts. However tika happy to be on top, again demanding Muslim love. Inara start making plans. Ejaz start hunted suspicious. Fractured relationships among sides finally collapsed when a misfortune befell Ejaz and snatching away all the dreams and his love for Warda and aviation.

== Cast ==
=== Main cast ===
- Fattah Amin as Ejaz Fakhri
- Neelofa as Warda Erina
- Ben Amir as Muslim
- Eleena Sui as Inara

=== Extended Cast ===
- Azhar Amir as Tan Sri Khalid Al-Fatah
- Datin Nina Juren as Puan Sri Nabiha
- Rahim Omar as Dato' Dr Hasbullah
- Aleza Shadan as Datin Afifah
- Azar Azmi as Humaira
- Alvin Chong as Johan
- Fahad Iman as Rafeeq
- Adriana Adnan as Jannah
- Nizen Ayob as Faris
- Neera Azizi as Emira
- Mas Khan as Daniel Sein
- Normah Damanhuri as Ejaz Fakhri grandma
- Fatihah Baharum as Raisha
- Zulkifli Mohd Salleh as Muslim's dad
- Mak Wan as Muslim's mom
- Hashimah Zaki as Humaira
- Elly Suhaili as Kak Su
- Datin Paduka Eina Azman as Dr Khairina
- Zila Bakarin as Dr Khairina's mom

=== Child cast ===
- Adrianna Qasmia as Qisha
- Duerra Mitilda as Wafiyya Elena

=== Cameo ===
- Alif Satar as Ahnaf Wafiy
- Siti Nordiana as Hani Safira
- CK Faizal as hoster

== Soundtrack ==
No.	Title	Singer	Length
1.	"Selamanya Cinta"	Shila Amzah & Alif Satar
2.	"Pantun Budi"	Tan Sri SM Salim
3.	"Wahai Kekasih"	Katahati
4.	"Tak Akan Pernah Jauh"	Katahati
5.	"Redha"	Irfan Haris
6.	"Zhong Jinhua"	Alvin Chong
7.	"Aku Cuma Punya Hati"	Mytha Lestari
8.	"Dari Mata"	Jaz
9.	"Selamat Pengantin Baru"	Anita Sarawak
10.	"Bila"	Alif Satar
11.	"Aku Yang Berdosa"	Shahir Zawawi
12.	"Patah"	Stacy
13.	"Setia"	Kilafairy
14.	"Hilang"	Adira

== Awards and nominations ==
Years	Awards	Category	Receiver	Results
2017	Anugerah Throwbaek Drama	Drama Throwbaek	Suri Hati Mr. Pilot	Won
2017	Anugerah Throwbaek Drama	Hero Throwbaek	Fattah Amin	Won
2017	Anugerah Throwbaek Drama	Heroin Throwbaek	Neelofa	Won
2017	Anugerah Throwbaek Drama	Supporting actor	Alvin Chong	Nominated
2017	Anugerah Throwbaek Drama	Kapel Throwbaek	Fattah Amin & Neelofa	Won
2017	Anugerah Throwbaek Drama	OST Throwbaek	Shila Amzah, Alif Satar (Selamanya Cinta)	Won
2017	Anugerah MeleTop Era 2017	Drama TV MeleTOP	Suri Hati Mr. Pilot	Won
2017	Anugerah MeleTop Era 2017	Pelakon TV MeleTOP	Fattah Amin	Won
2017	Anugerah MeleTop Era 2017	Pelakon TV MeleTOP	Neelofa	Nominated
2017	Anugerah MeleTop Era 2017	Artis Baru MeleTOP	Alvin Chong	Nominated
2017	Anugerah Bintang Popular Berita Harian ke-30	Pelakon TV Lelaki Popular	Fattah Amin	Won
2017	Anugerah Bintang Popular Berita Harian ke-30	Pelakon TV Wanita Popular	Neelofa	Won
2017	Anugerah Bintang Popular Berita Harian ke-30	Gandingan Serasi	Fattah Amin & Neelofa	Won
2017	Anugerah Telenovela	Telenovela Popular	Suri Hati Mr. Pilot	Won
2017	Anugerah Telenovela	Pelakon Lelaki Popular	Fattah Amin	Won
2017	Anugerah Telenovela	Pelakon Wanita Popular	Neelofa	Won
