= Dewi Remaja =

Malaysian reality television series

- Formation: 1985; 41 years ago
- Type: Reality television
- Headquarters: Kuala Lumpur, Malaysia
- Location: Malaysia
- Official language: Malay
- Owner: Nu Ideaktiv Sdn. Bhd.
- Affiliations: Remaja (magazine)
- Website: Official website

Dewi Remaja is a Malaysian reality television show in which aspiring young women vie for the coveted title and a pathway into the modelling or acting industry in the country.

The current Dewi Remaja is Nylea Adzlan of Kuala Lumpur. She was crowned by the outgoing winner, Nurelyana Baharin of Sarawak.

== History ==
The competition was created and organised by Remaja magazine, originally under Kumpulan Media Karangkraf Sdn. Bhd. (now Nu Ideaktif Sdn. Bhd.), and is primarily broadcast by Astro. Since its inception in 1985, Dewi Remaja has crowned 13 winners, with each titleholder traditionally crowned by her predecessor.

During the 2018 edition of Dewi Remaja, the winner Haneesya Hanee was stripped off her title due to a controversial video of her with other friends at a nightclub. However, she was not replaced by any of the runners-up. For the first time in the history of Dewi Remaja, the Remaja magazine did not feature a winning image of the winner on the cover page.

== Contestant selection ==
Each edition of Dewi Remaja has eight episodes and starts with 10 to 12 contestants. Contestants are judged weekly based on their overall appearance and participation in challenges. In some editions, every contestants get the chance to be appear on the cover page of Remaja magazine; each episode, one contestant is eliminated, whereas in exceptional situations, the panel of judges did not comply on an elimination.

=== Selection of participants ===
Started from 2019, the talent search, which was jointly organized by Remaja magazine, one of the brands under Nu Ideaktiv (formerly known as Karangkraf Group), explicitly states that each participant need to go through the category of "General Knowledge" as one of the participants' scoring criteria in order to increase the variety of participants. Judging panelists Scha Al-Yahya (former Dewi Remaja) and Yusry Abdul Halim will be judging 30 percent of the marks for personality, 35 percent for talent, and 35 percent for overall performance which includes the general knowledge.

Following that, a total of top 20 quarter-finalists were chosen for the final screening, with only 12 being chosen as semi-finalists.

== Titleholders ==
Edition	Year	Candidate	Age (Note: Ages at the time of Dewi Remaja.)	Represented
14th	2025	Nylea Adzlan	23	Kuala Lumpur
13th	2023	Nurelyana Baharin	21	Sarawak
12th	2022	Tracie Sinidol	21	Sabah
11th	2019	Shaza Bae	24	Kuala Lumpur
10th	2018	Haneesya Hanee (Note: Haneesya was dethroned shortly after she won the title, but was not replaced by any of the runners-up.)	18	Kuala Lumpur
9th	2014–2015	Raysha Rizrose	18	Selangor
8th	2009–2010	Noor Neelofa	21	Kelantan
7th	2005–2006	Scha Al-Yahya	22	Kedah
6th	2002–2003	Annahita Bakavoli	21	Penang
5th	1998–1999	Juliana Banos	20	Pahang
4th	1995–1996	Wan Khatijah	18	Terengganu
3rd	1990–1991	Jasmeen Kaur	n/a	Selangor
2nd	1987–1988	Aleeza Kassim	18	Kuala Lumpur
1st	1985–1986	Tengku Anis Ismail	n/a	Pahang

=== Gallery of winners ===
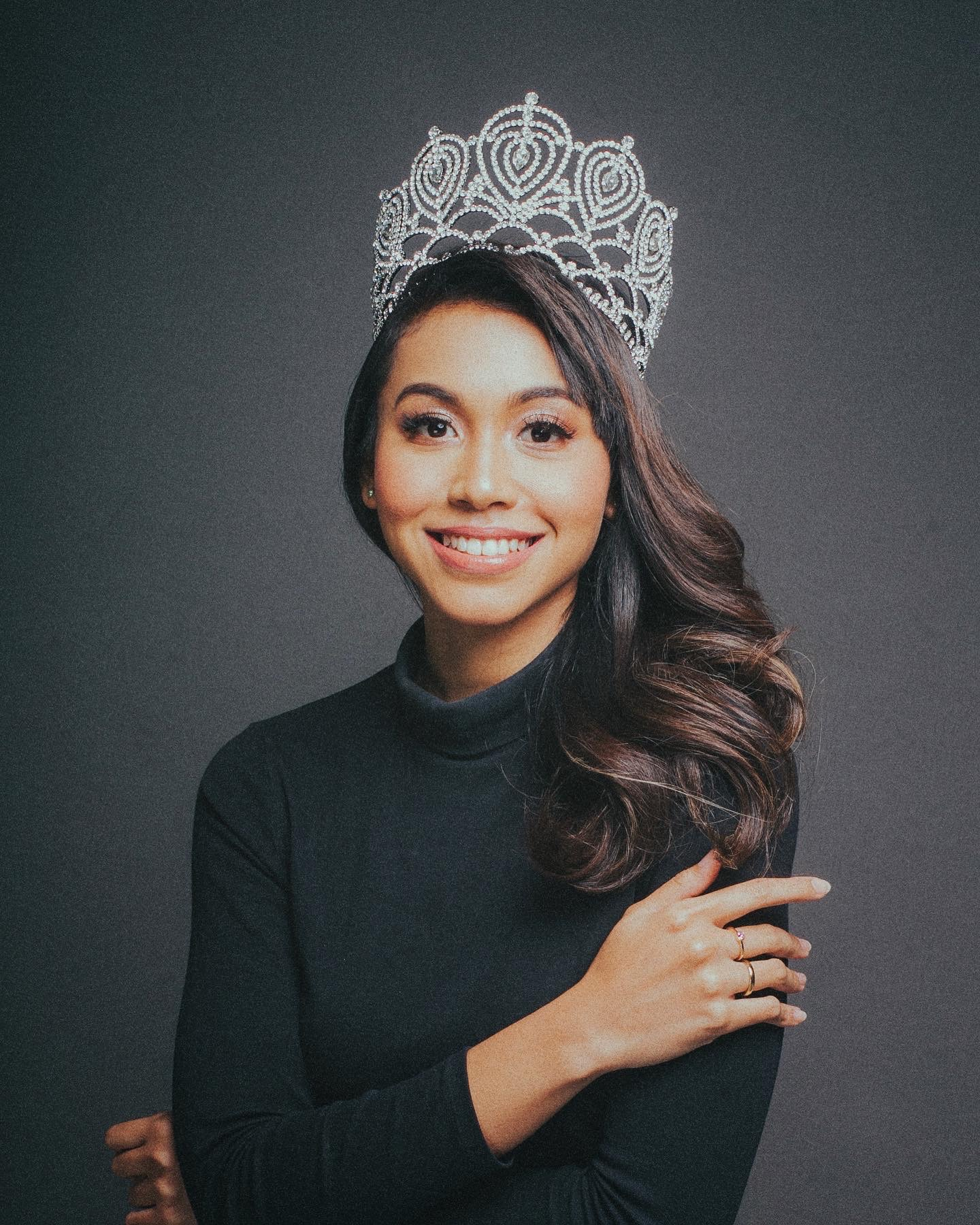
Dewi Remaja 2019/2020
Shaza Bae

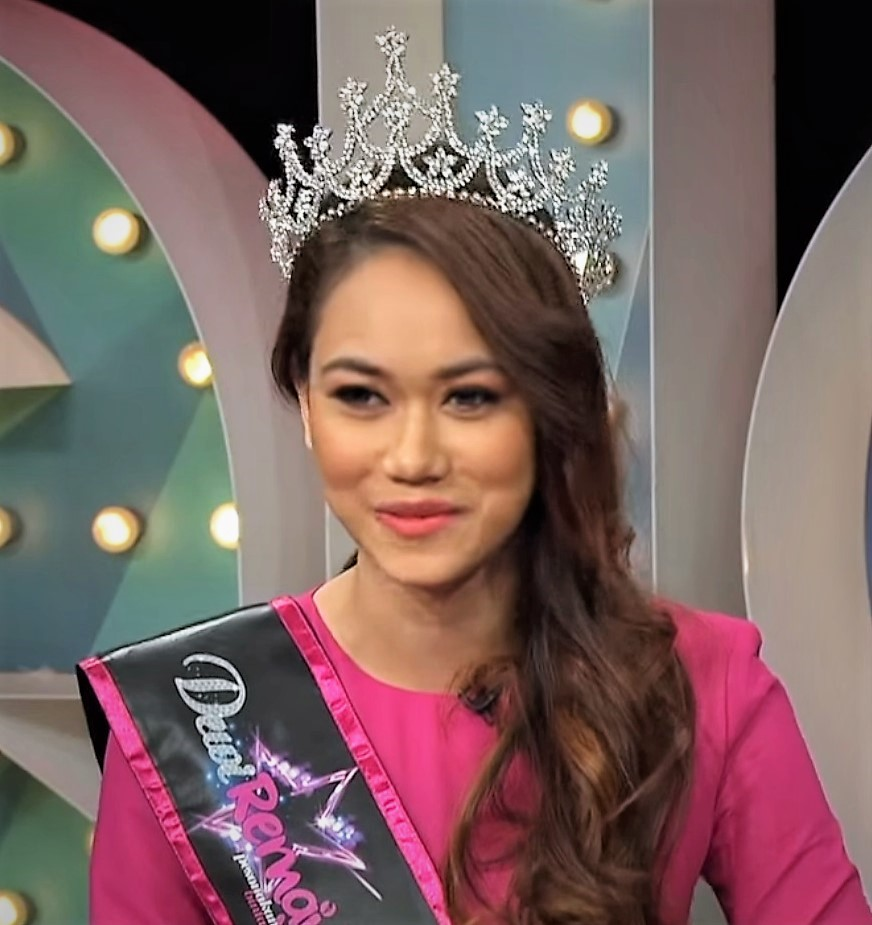
Dewi Remaja 2014/2015
Raysha Rizrose

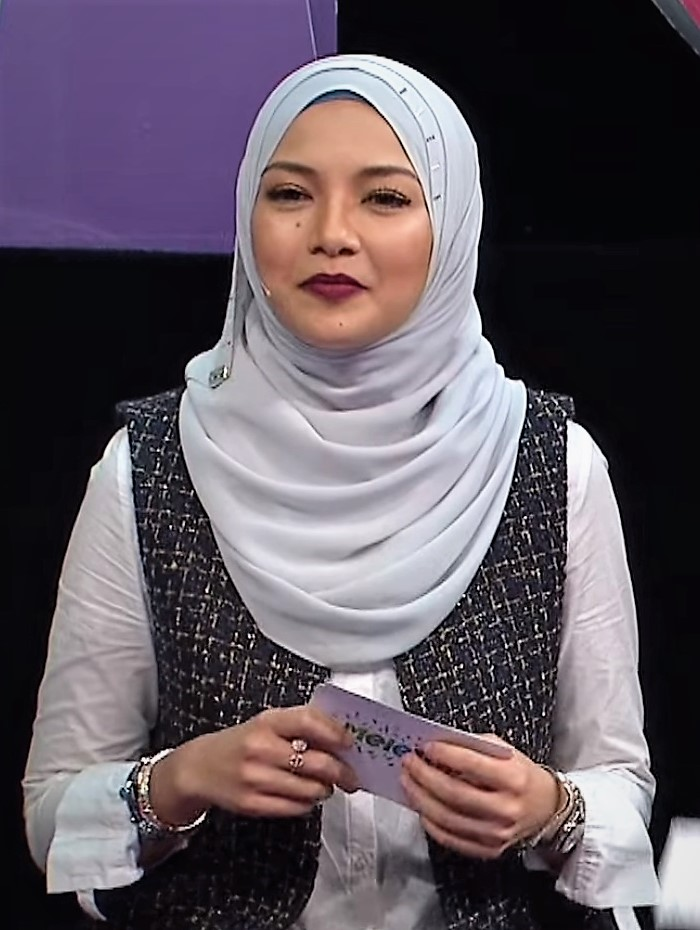
Dewi Remaja 2009/2010
Noor Neelofa

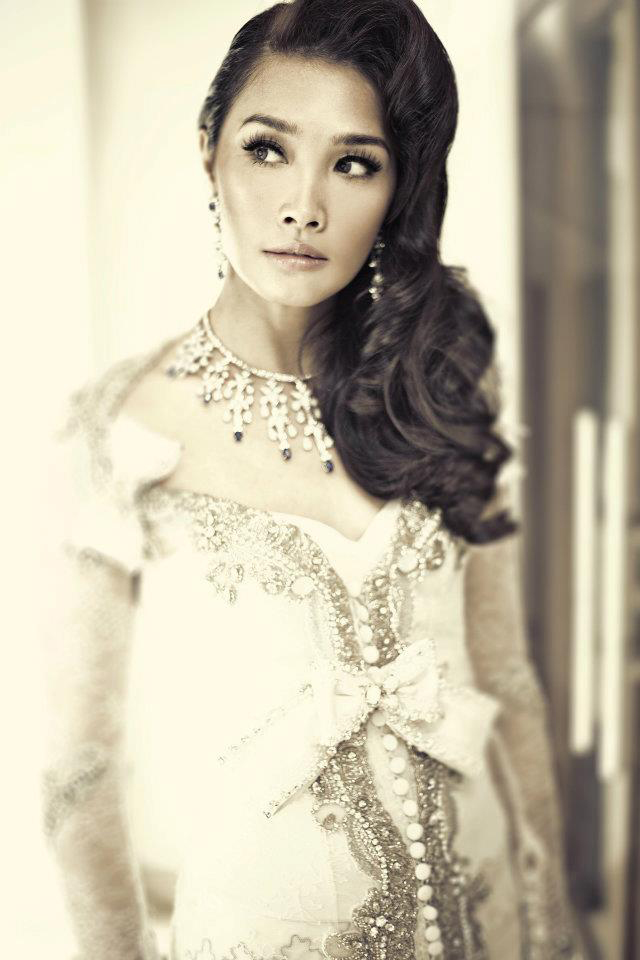
Dewi Remaja 2005/2006
Scha Al-Yahya

=== List of Runners-up ===
Edition	1st Runner-up	2nd Runner-up	3rd Runner-up	4th Runner-up
2025	Nelysa Kay	Dheper Teh	Marisa Baharudin	Not awarded
2023	Arabella Ellen	Not awarded in 2023		
2022	Bee Aishah	Kimberly Chuah	Alyssa Azmi	Not awarded
2019	Adriana Ghaafar	Nynaa Harizal	Syamira Izzati	Shatirah Amanda
2018	Tia Sarah	Sherin Amiri	Anna Jobling	Affie Rania
2014–2015	Syamim Farid	Balqish Maarif	Not awarded from 1985 – 2015	
2009–2010	Izara Aishah	Shangkaree Nadarajan	Not awarded from 1985 – 2015	
2005–2006	Ivy Lee	Hasaida Kamaruddin	Not awarded from 1985 – 2015	
2005–2006	Ivy Lee	Izreen Azmida	Not awarded from 1985 – 2015	
2005–2006	Ivy Lee	Nicolita Sanseh	Not awarded from 1985 – 2015	
2002–2003	Pushpa Narayan	Unknown	Not awarded from 1985 – 2015	
1998–1999	Unknown	Unknown	Not awarded from 1985 – 2015	
1995–1996	Unknown	Unknown	Not awarded from 1985 – 2015	
1990–1991	Sofea Jane	Ermie Zura	Not awarded from 1985 – 2015	
1987–1988	Nurul Huda	Mimi Waheeda	Not awarded from 1985 – 2015	
1985–1986	Rehana Yasin	Unknown	Not awarded from 1985 – 2015	

== Editions ==
=== Dewi Remaja 2019 ===
For the 11th edition, 600 contestants from all across Malaysia were auditioned for the competition before top 20 quarter-finalists were selected. Top 12 semi-finalists were announced during the press conference on 15 October 2019 held at The Starling Mall, Damansara Utama. They were quarantined for 54 days to minimize any social problems as seen during the previous edition.

The competition was aired over the course of eight episodes on Astro Ria and Astro Ria HD, whereby contestants were eliminated. The top five finalists then competed in a finals held on 14 December 2019 and was telecast live. At the end of the competition, Shaza Nuriman Mohamad Zamri (stage name: Shaza Bae) from Kuala Lumpur won the title of Dewi Remaja 2019.

Final results	Contestant
Dewi Remaja 2019	Shaza Bae
1st runner-up	Adriana Ghaafar
2nd runner-up	Nynaa Harizal
3rd runner-up	Syamira Izzati
4th runner-up	Shatirah Amanda
Top 12	Adrianna Fernandez; Aishah Azhan; Myra Natasha; Nina Amin; Saidah Syahirah; Sharlina Gilbert; Syaza Azra
Top 20	Aida Shuada Faizal; Aini Sophi; Clara James; Farha Nabila; Farzana Zainul Abidin; Hidatul Hikmah; Nina Ariff; Shahirah Sazali

== Notable alumni ==
Among the names of celebrities who have been born through this competition is Mawar Rashid, Puteri Aishah, Neelofa, Izara Aishah, Anzalna Nasir, Scha Al-Yahya, Izreen Azminda, Annahita Bakavoli, Juliana Banos, Rita Rudaini, Wardina Safiyyah, Julia Hana, Pushpa Narayan, Rozita Che Wan, Aleeza Kassim, Jasmin Hamid, Umie Aida, singer Sheril Aida, Rehana Yasin and many others.
