= Salina Saibi =

Malaysian actress

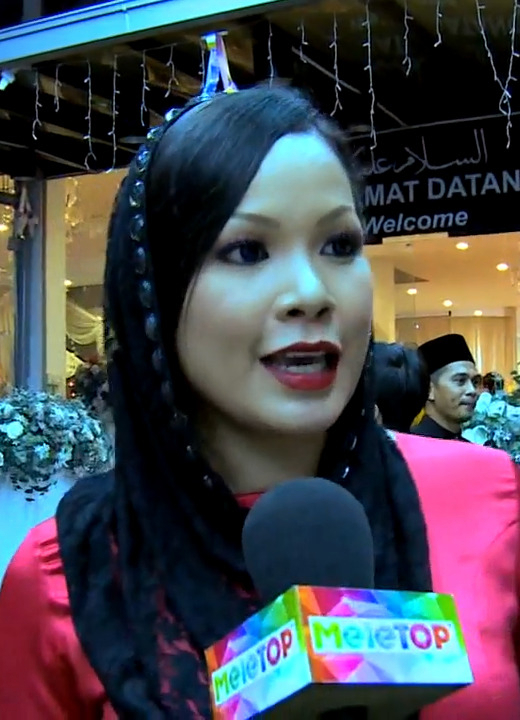
- Salina interviewed by MeleTOP in 2014.
- Born: 10 January 1982 (age 44); Kuala Lumpur, Malaysia
- Education: Sijil Pelajaran Malaysia (SPM)
- Occupations: Actress, model
- Years active: 2001–present
- Spouse: Azmir Osman (m. 2007)
- Children: 2
- Parent: Saibi Yusof

Salina Saibi (born 10 January 1982) is a Malaysian actress and model. Known for her role in police procedural television series, CID 3278 and Gerak Khas, Salina made a breakthrough role as Amy in her debut film, Bohsia: Jangan Pilih Jalan Hitam (2009) directed by Syamsul Yusof, wherein she won the Best Supporting Actress at the 22nd Malaysia Film Festival.

== Early life ==
Salina was born on 10 January 1982 in Kuala Lumpur and is the second child of five siblings. She graduated with Sijil Pelajaran Malaysia (SPM).

== Career ==
Prior to her acting career, Salina first began her early career as a singer, although it is unclear whether she ever recorded an album or vice versa. During her early years in showbiz, Salina has appeared in numerous drama series and telemovies on major TV networks including RTM, TV3, TV9 and Astro.

She rose to fame when portraying Inspector Rita in the police procedural drama series CID 3278 which also stars Faizal Yusof, Along Eyzendy, Azman Nor, criminal analyst Kamal Affandi Hashim and many others.

In 2007, Salina was first appeared as a guest star in Gerak Khas where she appeared in one of the series' episode in ninth season, "Misteri Elisa" ("The Mystery of Elisa"). From tenth season onwards, she became the regular cast as Inspector (later ASP) Salina. Since then, she has worked extensively with Yusof Haslam-owned Skop Productions, until Gerak Khas went on its final season in 2020. The series was originally set as a year-long series, but due to its continuous success and consistent top rating, the series was extended for an indefinite time until it finally ended on March 27, 2021, with a total of 20 seasons and 1,054 episodes. Salina appeared in seasons 10 to 20 during this period.

Salina appeared as a main role with Nabila Huda in the 2009 social action drama film, Bohsia: Jangan Pilih Jalan Hitam directed by Syamsul Yusof; where she portrays Amy, a bohsia girl who enjoyed a free lifestyle, it also stars Shaheizy Sam, Johan from Raja Lawak fame, Aaron Aziz and Diana Danielle. Her performance in the film enable Salina to win the Best Supporting Actress at the 22nd Malaysia Film Festival. This is the only award that she received throughout her acting career.

Salina appeared in two films released simultaneously in 2011, the horror film Khurafat: Perjanjian Syaitan in which her character as Zura, Anna's close friend starring Sabrina Ali, and the romantic comedy Aku Bukan Tomboy, Salina plays her role as Sam, a lesbian girl who has feelings for Farisha starred by Scha Al-Yahya. The film requires her to wear a corsette.

She starred in the telemovie for Astro Citra, Asmara Beijing directed by Yusof Haslam, alongside Syamsul Yusof and Norman Hakim, tells the story of Dira who took herself away to Beijing, China after sulking with her love for Rizal. The rest of the telemovie was filmed in Kuala Lumpur. She then return as Amy in the film Jalan Kembali: Bohsia 2, sequel of the first film which premiered on 7 June 2012.

From 2014 to 2021, Salina seems to shy away from public view and media spotlight and declines to appear in any television dramas to focus solely on Gerak Khas. In an interview with Sinar Harian, Salina said that being part of the Gerak Khas production team makes her feel more comfortable and refused to receive any offers as she didn't want to be selfish while has no intentions to changed that. She later revealed in an interview with Harian Metro in December 2020 that she wish to begin with Gerak Khas and ends with the series as well.

Salina was one of the cast members of Syafiq Yusof's horror flick Penunggang Agama where she portrayed her role as Huda. After Gerak Khas ended, she appeared in TV3's primetime drama Perisik Cinta Tak Diundang, playing the role as Hanim. It become her first TV drama with other production companies in 8 years since Duri Di Hati (2013).

== Personal life ==
Salina married Azmir Osman (who is 19 years her senior) in August 2007. The couple have 2 daughters.

On 9 July 2017, her father, Saibi Yusof died of liver cancer. Salina is also active in making and selling biscuits, especially during the fasting month of Ramadan.

== Filmography ==
=== Film ===
Year	Title	Role	Notes
2009	Bohsia: Jangan Pilih Jalan Hitam	Amy	Debut film appearances
2011	Khurafat: Perjanjian Syaitan	Zura	
2011	Aku Bukan Tomboy	Sam	
2012	Jalan Kembali: Bohsia 2	Amy	
2017	Dhaka Attack	Police Officer	Bangladeshi film
2021	Penunggang Agama	Puan Huda	
2021	Penunggang Agama 2	Puan Huda	

=== Television series ===
Year	Title	Role	TV channel	Notes
2002	Spanar Jaya		NTV7	Guest artist
2003	Mengejar Pelangi	Shida	Astro Ria	
2004	Senario		TV3	Guest artist
2005	Puteri		TV3	
2006–2007	CID 3278	Inspector Rita	TV9	
2007–2008	Pasrah The Series	Natasha	TV9	
2007	Gerak Khas (Season 9)	Elisa	TV2	Episode: "Misteri Elisa"
2007	Airmata Maria	Julie	TV3	
2008	Mariam		TV3	
2008–2009	Laila Majnun		TV3	
2008–2009	Dari Mata Arisa	Shareen	TV1	
2008–2011; 2014–2021	Gerak Khas	ASP Salina	TV2, TV3	
2010	Nigina	Natasha	TV3	
2011	Si Capik (Season 3)	Rita	TV2	
2011	Serapah Darah Bulan Madu	Adura	Astro Prima	
2011–2013	Roda-Roda Kuala Lumpur	Inspector Salina	TV2	Guest artist
2012–2013	Metro Skuad	ASP Syakira	TV2	
2013	Di Bawah Langit		TV1	
2013	Duri Di Hati		TV3	
2013	Mira Sofea	Eira	Astro Prima	
2017	Dia Bidadariku	Rita	Astro Ria	
2021–2022	Gerak Khas Undercover	Salina	TV3	
2021	Perisik Cinta Tak Diundang	Hanim	TV3	
2021	Jangan Ganggu Jodohku	Saka Ratu Lempeng	Astro Ria	
2021	Oh My Hantaran	Bidan Yaya	TV9	
2022	3 Nota Cinta	Amy	TV3	
2022	Ku Punya Hati	Intan	TV3	

=== Telemovie ===
Year	Title	Role	TV channel
2002	Ayam		
2003	Cinta Betting		
2003	Indi Anak Jon		
2003	SpyMan		
2004	Permintaan Terakhir		
2005	Hang 2		VCD
2008	Surat dari Alamanda		
2008	Puasa Terakhir		
2009	Bila Guruh Bergempita		
2010	Kuala Pilah Next Top Model		
2011	Impian Terindah		
2011	Nasi Goreng Ikan Masin		
2012	Calon Suamiku		
2012	Asmara Beijing	Dira	Astro Citra
2012	Anak Pak Hussein	Zulaikha	TV1
2013	Sepasang Kurung Biru		
2020	Badi Selendang Merah		Astro Citra
2022	Kerana Binti Abdullah	Maria	TV1
2022	Tanggang Langgang		TV3

=== Television ===
Year	Title	TV channel	Notes
2021	Sepahtu Reunion Live	Astro Warna	Episode: "Mengharapkan Pagar"

=== Advertisement ===
Year	Title	Note
2003	Pastikan ORI! Baru Beli!?	Also starred with Adam Corrie

== Awards and nominations ==
Year	Award	Category	Recipient/nominated works	Result
2009	22nd Malaysia Film Festival	Best Supporting Actress	Bohsia: Jangan Pilih Jalan Hitam	Won
