= Raja Lawak Astro =

Malaysian TV reality show

- Also known as: Super Comedian
- Genre: Comedy
- Created by: Astro
- Presented by: Sharifah Shahirah (Season 1); Johan & Zizan (Season 2–7); Yus & Tauke (Season 7)
- Country of origin: Malaysia
- Original language: Malay
- No. of seasons: 7

Original release
- Network: Astro Prima; Astro Warna; Astro Mustika HD
- Release: 2007 – 2013

Raja Lawak Astro is a Malaysian TV reality show that searches for comedic talent. It started broadcasting in early 2007. Every week contestants perform a joke according to the theme set on stage. They are judged to choose winners to proceed to the next round. The winner is crowned "King of Comedy," as reviewed by the audience and the judge in the final round.

== On air ==
Raja Lawak Astro aired on Astro Ria during its first season and on Astro Prima during its second through sixth seasons, which were hosted by Johan and Zizan. The sixth and seventh seasons aired on Astro Warna and Mustika HD before the program was transferred to Astro AEC in December 2014. The eighth season became known as Super Comedian, airing in Chinese and the Skool of Lawak was replaced by Raja Lawak starting in 2014.

== Hosts, judges, and contestants ==
=== Host ===
Sharifah Shahira, who hosted the show for the first season, was replaced by two former contestants, Johan and Zizan, until the end of the seventh season. In Season 7, Yus and Tauke, also former contestants, were selected as temporary hosts, replacing Johan and Zizan.

=== Judges ===
The show judges assess each contestant's performance and select the winners. On 2 April 2010, Din Beramboi, a judge since 2010, died after suffering from hemorrhagic dengue fever.

Season	Judges	Mentor
1	Louise F. Cypher	Jalil Hamid, Sabri Yunus, Datuk Jamali Shadat, A. R. Badul & Cat Farish
2	Zaibo, Enot & Harun Salim Bachik	-
3	Zaibo, Fauziah Nawi & Shamsul Ghau Ghau	Radhi Khalid
4	Bob Lokman, Din Beramboi & Afdlin Shauki	-
5	David Teo, Sathiya & Afdlin Shauki	-
6	David Teo, Sathiya & Sheila Rusly	Ahmad Idham (Big Boss), Yus, Tauke & Angah
7	Dato' AC Mizal, Isma Aliff & Saiful Apek	-

=== Contestants ===
Season	Winner	Runner-up	Third	Finalist(s)	Other contestants in order of elimination	Host
1	Yussry Edoo	Zizan Razak	Johan	Tauke & Angah	Fairuz lynnzan, Mie, Pok De, Acad, Mat, Cicik, Idan, Mail, Arab, Samad, Bob & Isbolt Rolando	Sharifah Shahira
2	Ahmad Nabil Ahmad	Kumpulan Cham	Kumpulan XN3	-	Pak Tam, Shah, Kumpulan Ketampi, Kumpulan Awas, Azil, Devan & Husin	Johan & Zizan
3	Kumpulan Sepah	Jihan	Amir	-	Kumpulan LNJ, Kumpulan Chot, Am, Yann, Man Belon, Talam, Adam, Syem & Mat	Johan & Zizan
4	Kumpulan Kecik	Idlan	Alex	-	Kumpulan Mamu, Caca, Kumpulan AN2, Faiz, Kumpulan Wili, JD & Aman	Johan & Zizan
5	Abdul Rahman Kasim	Kumpulan R2	Kumpulan Balas	-	Nazmi, Epy, Leman, Kumpulan Lucky, Kumpulan Pukaw, Kumpulan Kopio, Kumpulan TBO, Kumpulan Kami & Kumpulan Bobo	Johan & Zizan
6	Kumpulan Shiro	Kumpulan Zero	Kumpulan Cuit	Kumpulan 2Yol	Kumpulan Albob, Kumpulan G-man, Kumpulan Ketupat, Kumpulan King, Kodan, Kumpulan Riki, Kumpulan Selak & Kumpulan Skema	Johan & Zizan
7	Kumpulan Wala	Kumpulan Sakan	Kumpulan Bora	Kumpulan Gamat	Boy, Emy, Ali, Kumpulan Ganu, Kumpulan Kintan, Kumpulan Okay, Kumpulan Pahat, Kumpulan Taras, Kumpulan Tuah & Kumpulan Xtra	Johan, Zizan, Yus & Tauke

== Maharaja Lawak ==
All of the finalists returned for Comedian Superstar, Maharaja Lawak, which was hosted by Dato' Ac Mizal to pick the best among the annual winners. Contestants from seasons one through five reunited to determine who is the best comedian among the winners of the previous seasons. The 12 finalists who competed are:

- Jambu (Yus and Tauke)
- Nabil (Ahmad Nabil Ahmad)
- XN3 (Pak Cu and Anu)
- Sepah (Jep, Shuib and Mamat)
- Jihan (Jihan Muse)
- Amir (Amirullah)
- Wai (Wan Kecik, Achoe Kecik and Idlan)
- Alex (Alex Raja Lawak)
- Man (Man Raja Lawak)
- R2 (Rahim and Wan Lopez)
- Balas (Shuk and Fendi)

The show crowned comedian Sepah as the winner and the best comedian (King of the Kings).
