= Nabil Ahmad =

Malaysian comedian (born 1983)

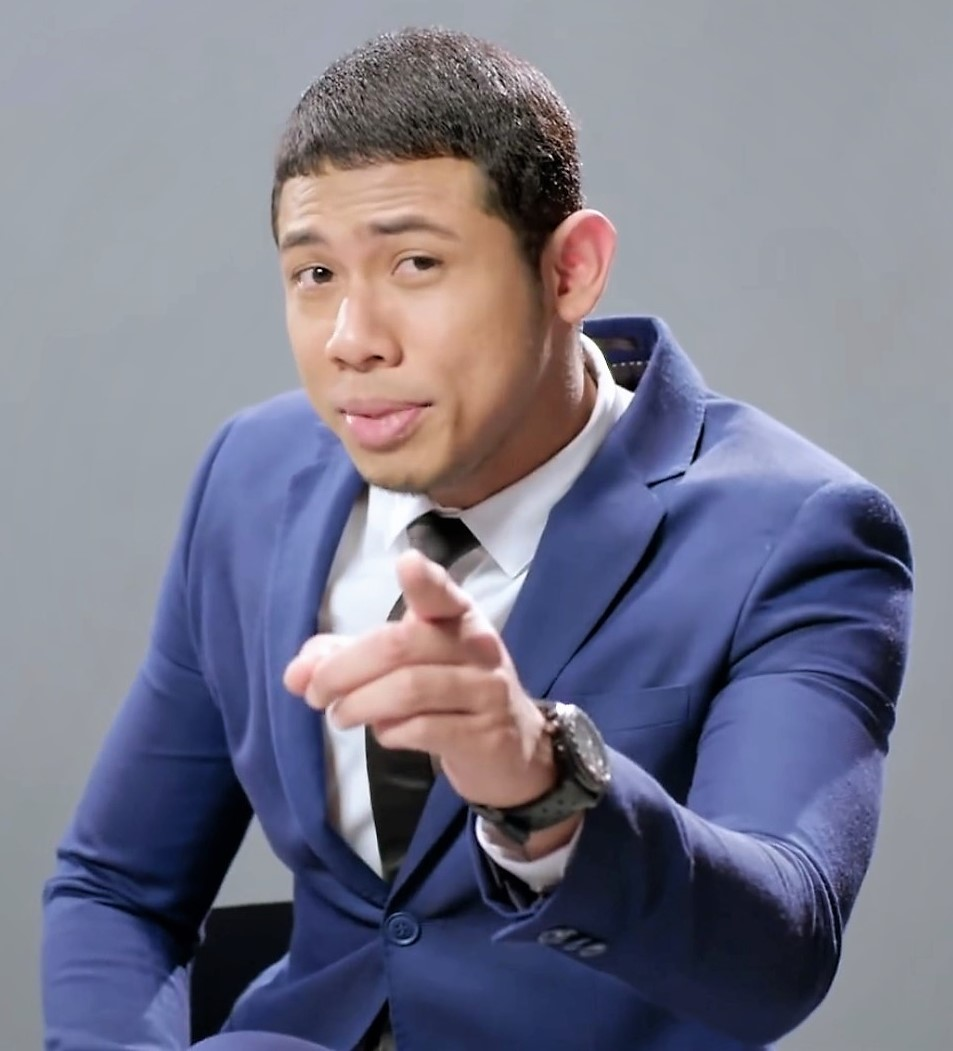
- Nabil in a promotion for Anugerah MeleTOP Era in 2016
- Born: Ahmad Nabil bin Ahmad; 26 September 1983 (age 42); Mambau, Negeri Sembilan, Malaysia
- Occupations: Comedian; Actor; Host Television; Radio Presenter; Film Director; Writer; Producer
- Years active: 2008–present
- Employers: Star Media Radio Group (2012); Astro Radio (2013–present)
- Spouse: Nazirah Ayoub (m. 2011)
- Children: 3

Ahmad Nabil Ahmad (born 26 September 1983) is a Malaysian entertainer, comedian and actor. He worked as a motorcycle courier before winning the 2008 season of comedy competition Raja Lawak. Nabil has since won an award for hosting multiple television programs, beginning with MeleTOP in 2012, which he still hosts. He further expanded his roles by becoming a producer in 2017, and a film writer and director in 2018.

== Early life ==
Ahmad Nabil Ahmad was born on 26 September 1983, in Mambau, the capital of the state of Negeri Sembilan, Malaysia.

In 2008, Nabil was working as a motorcycle courier in the small town of Mambau, earning RM600 (about US$143) a month, when he was transferred to Kuala Lumpur for work. As a prank, the friend he was staying with signed him up for an audition for Raja Lawak (King of Comedy), a Malaysian television reality show that searches for comedic talent. Nabil did not have access to satellite television at his previous home, so was not familiar with the show, but tried out anyway.

== Career ==
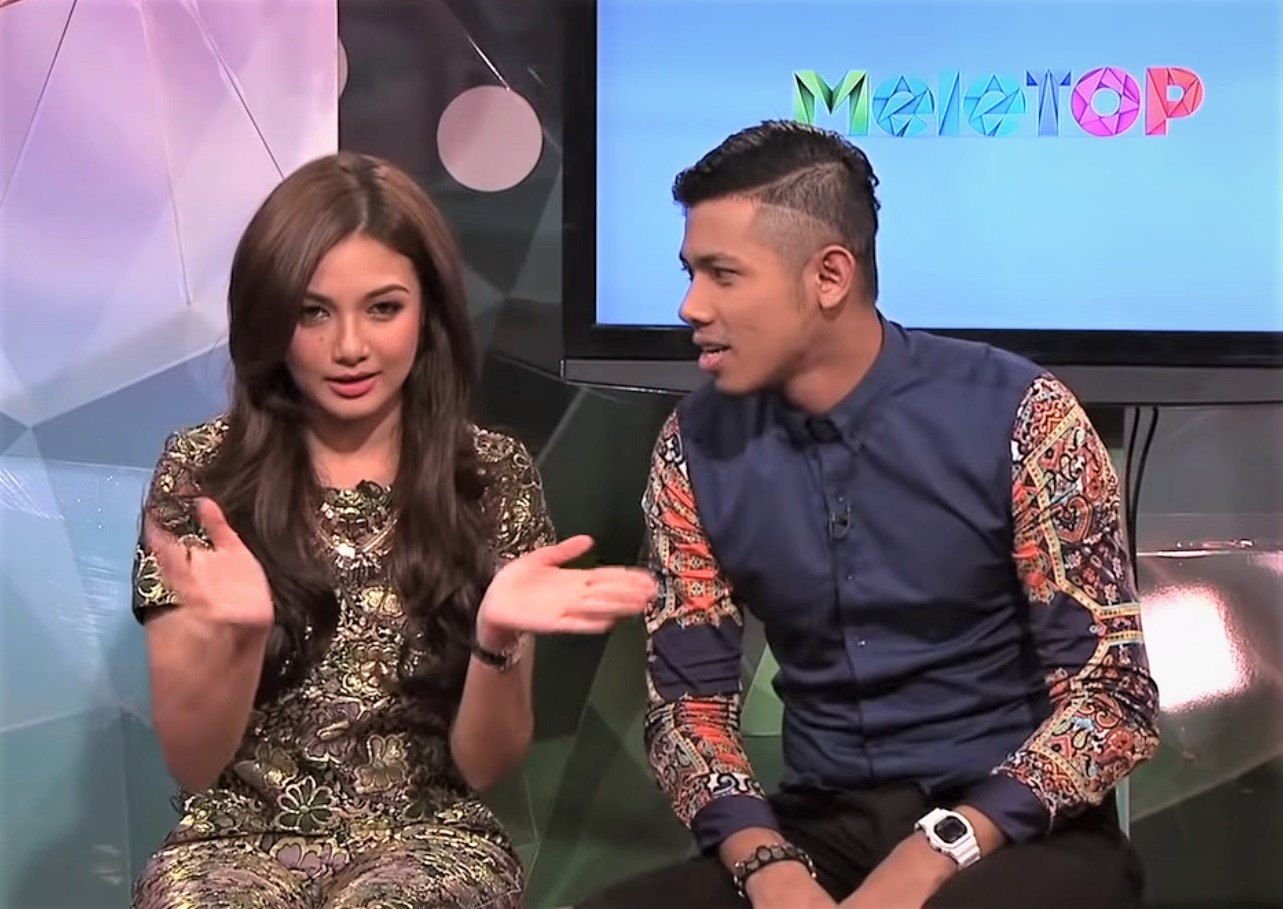
Neelofa and Nabil on MeleTOP episode 100 in 2014

After several weeks of competition, Nabil won the second season of Raja Lawak, which brought him to prominence as a comedian. Due to this victory he is sometimes known as "Nabil Raja Lawak". As an actor, Nabil played roles in the comedy films Pisau Cukur (2009), and Berani Punya Budak (2012) as well as in the later dramas Geng Bas Sekolah (2013) and Bila Kau Datang (2015).

From comedy, Nabil gradually transitioned to hosting television shows. He says that being a comedian involves a lot of pressure, being "expected to go up on stage and make people laugh immediately. ... with hosting I am much more relaxed, and everything feels less pressured.... But it allows me to still show my funny side by inserting jokes here and there."

His first hosting position, which he still holds, was entertainment talk show MeleTOP, in 2012. This was joined by music competition Gegar Vaganza, in 2014, both aired on Astro Ria. He was the original host of MeleTOP, along with female co-host Neelofa, and remained hosting the show when she left in 2019. He says he has been told he is synonymous with MeleTOP. He has also hosted episodes of the related annual entertainment awards show Anugerah MeleTOP Era.

In 2015 Nabil became host of HBO Sentral, a monthly program showcasing HBO Asia programs, taking over from Lisa Surihani. In 2016, Nabil became co-host of children's Islamic reality competition show, Ceria I-Star, on Astro Ceria, alongside Ustaz Yeop. In 2017, HBO sent him to Hollywood to interview stars during the 89th Academy Awards. In 2018, he was awarded the Best Entertainment Presenter/Host at the Asian Academy Creative Awards in Cannes, France.

In 2017, Nabil began to look for business opportunities outside of personally entertaining, so as not to depend on that as a sole source of income. He set up an entertainment production company which has produced television series and a film. In 2018, Nabil wrote his first made-for-television film, The Hantus, a Malaysian horror comedy film wherein he co-directed with Helmi Yusof, thus marking his directorial debut, which was released on June 15, 2018 under KMN Production. Filming began mostly in Kuala Lumpur, Gombak and Genting Highlands. In 2019 he added a YouTube channel called Lupk TV.

== Personal life ==
In 2011, Nabil married former AirAsia stewardess, Nazira Ayoub. They have three daughters.

His entertainment success came with only limited financial security. During the 2020 Malaysia movement control order, he supported many friends from his hometown in Negeri Sembilan who had lost jobs so were worse off than he was, and says he was quite grateful for the government moratorium on debts that he otherwise would not have been able to pay off, due to canceled activities and job offers.

== Filmography ==
=== Film ===
Year	Title	Role	Notes
2009	Sifu & Tongga	Tongga	
2009	Jin Notti	Pusher	
2009	Momok The Movie	Jefri	
2009	Pisau Cukur	Host/Erique	
2010	Lu Pikirkan Sendiri de Movie	Nabil	
2010	Kecoh Betul	Aiman	
2010	Magika	Orang Minyak	
2012	Bujang Terlajak	Nabil	
2012	Berani Punya Budak	Adik John	
2012	Uncle Usin	Uncle Usin	
2012	Cinta Beruang	Nabu	
2012	Untuk Tiga Hari		
2012	Pontianak vs Orang Minyak	Ponti	
2013	Lawak Ke Der 2		
2015	Romeo Kota	Detective Fakhrul	
2016	Bo-Peng	Bo	
2021	Mat Bond Malaya	Nabil	Also as director, writer and producer
2023	Syaitan Munafik		

=== Television series ===
Year	Title	Role	TV channel	Notes
2009	Nabil & Co.	Nabil	TV3	
2009	Sonata Labu Labi The Series	Labu	Astro Warna	
2010	Kuih Goyang Syafiq	Syafiq	TV3	
2011	You Saka... Pergi Jauh-Jauh	Adrus	TV3	
2012	Oh My English! (Season 1)	Abang Nabil	Astro TVIQ	Episode: "Kelas 3 Merah Cungkil Bakat!"
2013	Geng Bas Sekolah		Astro Ceria	
2013	Mak Lang Datang Kompang Bergendang	Fitri	TV3	
2013	Rumah Kedai	Roslan	TV3	
2013	Goyang Syafiq... Jom Pi Cuti	Syafiq	TV3	
2014	Cakap Melayulah	Daud	Astro Warna	
2017	Bas Stop		Astro Warna	Also as producer

=== Telemovie ===
Year	Title	Role	TV channel	Notes
2009	Sonata Labu Labi	Labu	Astro Prima	
2009	Kuih Goyang Seha	Syafiq	TV3	
2012	Asmara Pontianak K-POP	Ejal	TV3	
2013	Kain, Jarum & Gunting	Fauzi	Astro Warna	
2014	Nangnok	Ali	Astro Ria	
2014	Strawberi Karipap Sesat Kat Paris	Uncle Faris	Astro First Exclusive	
2015	Bila Kau Datang	Arman	Astro Ria	
2018	The Hantus	—	Astro First Exclusive	Also as director
2019	“Dato” S	—	Astro First Exclusive	Also as director
2019	Gostan	—	Astro First Exclusive	Also as director

=== Theater ===
Year	Title
2012	Lawak Ke Der

== Radiography ==
=== Radio ===
Year	Title	Station
5 January – 29 November 2012	Breakfast@Suria	Suria
February 2013 – present	Carta Era 40, Era D'Boyz, Rancak Sabtu Era & 3 Pagi Era	Era
