= Cinta Beruang =

2012 Malaysian comedy film

- Release poster
- Directed by: Ramanarayanan
- Starring: Nabil Ahmad; Jue Aziz
- Production company: Fantaste Villa
- Distributed by: Grand Brilliance
- Release date: 11 October 2012
- Running time: 96 minutes
- Country: Malaysia
- Language: Malay

Cinta Beruang (transl. Bear love) is a 2012 Malaysian Malay-language comedy film directed by Ramanarayanan and starring Nabil Ahmad and Jue Aziz. The film is a remake of the Indian Malayalam film My Dear Karadi (1999).

== Cast ==
- Nabil Ahmad as Nabu
- Jue Aziz as Liza
- Tauke Jambu
- Ropie Cecupak
- Sathiya
- Angeline Tan
- Khatijah Tan
- Mat Over

== Production ==
In 2012, Rama Narayanan began work on the Malay remake of the Indian Malayalam film My Dear Karadi (1999), which was initially titled Cinta Buruwa. This film marked the director's Malay debut. Nabil Ahmad said he accepted to star in the film because he wanted to gain experience from working with an Indian director. The film takes place in the National Zoo of Malaysia near Kuala Lumpur.

== Reception ==
A critic from Kosmo! wrote that "The determination to produce the film is there but the effort to give meaning to a film is not visible".
