= Selamanya Cinta =

Single by Shila Amzah & Alif Satar

from the album My Journey
- Released: July 14, 2016
- Recorded: December 2015; NAR Records
- Genre: Pop
- Length: 4:12
- Label: Sony; Epic; Columbia; Shila Amzah
- Songwriter: Shila Amzah
- Producers: Helen Yap; Shila Amzah

Shila Amzah singles chronology
"Goodbye" (2015)	"Selamanya Cinta" (2016)	"HidayahMu" (2017)

"Selamanya Cinta" is a song recorded by Malaysian singer-songwriter Shila Amzah and Malaysian singer Alif Satar, taken from Shila's sixth and debut Chinese-language studio album, My Journey (2016). It was released on July 14, 2016, through Sony Music Malaysia (streaming) and July 15, 2016, through Shila Amzah Entertainment Berhad (digital download and streaming). The song was solely written by Shila Amzah and produced by Helen Yap with Shila's aid. The song was released as a single after My Journey was released in China on April 30, 2016, through her Hong Kong management label, Shilala (HK) Limited.

== Format and track listing ==
Digital download

1 "Selamanya Cinta" – 4:12

== Credits and personnel ==
Recording and management

- Recorded and mixed at NAR Records (Kuala Lumpur, Malaysia)
- Mastered at Sterling Sound (New York City, United States of America)
- Shilala (HK) Limited, Shila Amzah Entertainment Berhad, Sony Music Malaysia

Personnel

- Shila Amzah – lead vocals, writer, producer
- Alif Satar – lead vocals
- Helen Yap – producer, arranger, keyboards
- Jamie Wilson – guitar
- Ujang Exist – drums
- Bong Kamal Ali – bass
- Lim Jae Sern – strings
- Yap Yen – strings
- Veronika Thoene – strings
- Nasran Nawi – strings
- Amir Sulaiman – recording, mixing
- Tom Coyne – mastering

Credits are adapted from Helen Yap's Instagram post.

== Release history ==
List of radio and release dates with formats and record labels
Country	Date	Format	Label
Malaysia	July 14, 2016	Streaming	Sony Music Malaysia
Worldwide	July 15, 2016	Streaming, Digital download	Shila Amzah Entertainment Berhad
