= My Journey (Shila Amzah album) =

Studio album by Shila Amzah
- Released: April 30, 2016
- Recorded: 2014–2016
- Studio: Hong Kong; Beijing, China; Kuala Lumpur, Malaysia
- Genre: Mandopop; pop; dance-pop; R&B
- Language: Chinese; English; Malay
- Label: Shilala (HK) Ltd.
- Producer: Shila Amzah

Shila Amzah chronology
Shila Amzah (2013)	My Journey (2016)

Singles from My Journey
- 1. "再见不再见" Released: May 28, 2015; 2. "再见" Released: October 6, 2015; 3. "Selamanya Cinta (feat. Alif Satar)" Released: July 14, 2016

My Journey (stylized as "MY JOURNEY") is the sixth studio album and debut Chinese-language studio album by Malaysian singer-songwriter, Shila Amzah. It was released physically on April 30, 2016, through Shilala (HK) Limited. Shila began preparing for the album during the same year after she participated I Am a Singer (season 2), and during a significant amount of media scrutiny. Shila was 26 years old at the time of the album's release and she is the first Malay artist to release a full Chinese studio album at Beijing, China.

Musically, the album is mandopop music styled, and lyrically it speaks of romantic relationships and breakups, a couple of Shila wrote from experiencing a relationship before. Lyrics also touch on Shila's personal struggles in life. In contrast to Shila's previous work, the production of My Journey consists of drum programming, synthesizers, pulsating bass, processed backing vocals, and guitars.

== Background ==
Shila released her fifth album, Shila Amzah, on December 10, 2013. This album, My Journey marked a change in Shila's musical style with the experimentation of mandopop. Before Shila finally release a Chinese studio album, Shila suffered struggles with recording contracts with Shanghai Media Group before establishing her own major recording label, Shilala (HK) Limited. The album was delayed almost 2 years. Before this, Shila stated the album will be released by March 2016, but it was delayed to April 2016 because some of her songs were mastered and mixed in the United States of America late.

== Album packaging and release ==
My Journey was released on April 30, 2016, with seven tracks alongside three bonus tracks. Shila began teasing an announcement in March 2016. On April 22, 2016, Shila unveiled the album cover on Instagram featuring the date of her press conference. On April 30, 2016, Shila held a press conference launched her debut Chinese-language album.

== Singles ==
On May 28, 2015, Shila released her debut Chinese single in Hong Kong, "再见不再见" through her very own major recording label, Shilala (HK) Limited. The song was written by Liao Yu and composed by Shila herself. This single had been performed live during her Shila Amzah: The Symbol of Love, International Press Conference. The song became an instant hit on Weibo Music when the single reached 1 million downloads in just two days.

On October 1, 2015, Shila performed her second Chinese single in Hong Kong, "再见" during her Shila Amzah Meet & Greet Hong Kong. On October 6, 2015, Shila released the single through Shilala (HK) Limited on Weibo Music and iTunes.

On July 11, 2016, Shila announced that "Selamanya Cinta" feat. Alif Satar will be released as the official fifth single from the album on July 14, 2016. On July 14, 2016, Shila released "Selamanya Cinta" feat. Alif Satar through Sony Music Malaysia (streaming) and on July 15, 2016 through Shila Amzah Entertainment Berhad (digital and streaming).

== Track listing ==
My Journey 心旅– Standard edition
No.	Title	Writer(s)	Producer(s)	Length
1.	"The Secret of Sand"	Shila Amzah	Shila Amzah	5:02
2.	"See You or Never"	Liao Yu, Shila Amzah	Shila Amzah	4:43
3.	"Goodbye"	Kelvin Avon, Jessica Bennet, Xiao Guang	Jun Kung, Kelvin Avon	3:48
4.	"Home"	Shila Amzah	Shila Amzah	3:50
5.	"Bow Alone"	Shila Amzah	Shila Amzah	3:33
6.	"When I Love Me"	Khalil Fong	Khalil Fong	3:24
7.	"Phases in Love"	Shila Amzah	Shila Amzah	5:34
8.	"Human"	Shila Amzah	Helen Yap	3:45
9.	"Forever Love"	Shila Amzah	Helen Yap	4:12
10.	"It's You"	Shila Amzah	Helen Yap	3:46

== Release history ==
Country	Date	Format	Label
People's Republic of China	April 30, 2016	CD	Shilala (HK) Limited
Worldwide	April 30, 2016	Streaming, digital download	Shilala (HK) Limited

=== Singles ===
Single	Country	Date	Format	Label
再见不再见	Hong Kong	May 28, 2015	CD Single, digital download	Shilala (HK) Limited
再见	Hong Kong	October 6, 2015	CD Single, digital download	Shilala (HK) Limited
Selamanya Cinta feat. Alif Satar	Worldwide	July 14, 2016	Streaming	Sony Music Malaysia
Selamanya Cinta feat. Alif Satar	Worldwide	July 15, 2016	Digital download, streaming	Shila Amzah Entertainment Berhad
