= Alif Satar =

Malaysian reality television contestant, singer, television host and actor

- أليف ساتر
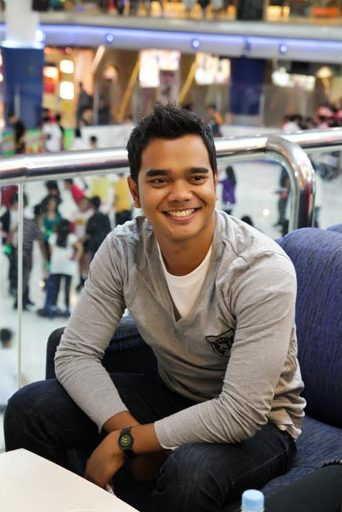
- Alif Satar in 2010
- Born: Muhammad Alif bin Mohd Satar; September 19, 1990 (age 36); Kuala Lumpur, Malaysia
- Occupations: Singer, actor, host, producer
- Years active: 2006–present
- Height: 1.7 m (5 ft 7 in)
- Spouse: Sha Dila Halid (m. 2014)
- Children: 3
- Musical career
- Genre: Pop
- Instrument: Vocal
- Label: Sony Music Malaysia Sdn Bhd Monkey Bone Records The 8 Unit

Muhammad Alif bin Mohd Satar (Jawi: اليف ساتر; born September 19, 1990) is a Malaysian singer, actor and television host.

Alif started his singing career after winning third place in 8TV's reality singing competition, One in a Million (OIAM), in its inaugural season in 2006. He has released three albums so far – Nakal (2009), Lelaki Seperti Aku (2011) and Definisi (2013).

== Career ==
At the age of 16, Alif started his singing career by becoming the contestant of the reality television series One in a Million, which aired on 8TV. He is the youngest contestant on the show.

Alif ranked at No. 11 on the Top 20 Knock-out show and emerged as one of the Top 12 contestants. Alif made it to the Grand Finale of the reality television show, defeating professional singer Dayang Nurfaizah who landed in fourth place. The competition ended on September 22, 2006. Alif was placed in third with Suki Low in first and Faizal Tahir in second.

Before entering the show, Alif performed mostly at events in school and was once cast as one of the Lost Boys in the West End production, Peter Pan – The Musical, in Genting Highlands when he was 14. He also initially wanted to be a pilot when he auditioned for reality singing competition, One in a Million.

Alif was featured in Ricky Martin's 2014 FIFA World Cup's song with Judika from Indonesia and Sezairi Sezali from Singapore. They recorded the song in different studios but the Asian singers met each other to promote the single.

Alif's acting career started in 2008 when he got a role in television series called Dendam which means Revenge. After that, his acting has been more recognized by fans after starring in romance television series called Dia Semanis Honey and other popular dramas. Also, due to the drama's popularity among its fans, it has been made into a musical theatre production.

In 2019, he appointed as the ambassador of the newly opened Harman Studio in Sunway Geo Avenue.

He collaborated with Malaysian nasheed group Raihan to re-recorded new version of their 1997 song "Sesungguhnya" ("Indeed"). Released under the title "Sesungguhnya '19", the song was released on 10 May.

On July 31, 2019, Alif released his new single song and music video called I Want You To Love Me.

=== One in a Million performances ===
Throughout the competition, Alif sang:

- This Love – Maroon 5 (Top 20)
- Pria Terhebat – Sheila on 7 (Top 12)
- Mama Tolong Percaya – Exist (Top 10)
- Lonely No More – Rob Thomas (Top 9)
- Unwell – matchbox twenty (Top 8)
- Feeling Good – Michael Bublé (Top 7)
- Harder to Breathe – Maroon 5 (Top 6)
- Tak Bisakah – Peter Pan (Top 6)
- Ain't No Other Man – Christina Aguilera (Top 5)
- The Remedy – Jason Mraz (Top 5)
- Footloose – Kenny Loggins (Top 4)
- Pretty Young Thing – Michael Jackson (duet with Reshmonu) (Top 4)
- The Call – Backstreet Boys (Top 3)
- Namun Ku Punya Hati – (Top 3)
- Khayal – Original composition (Grand Finale)
- Give Me Just One Night – 98 Degrees (Grand Finale)

== Personal life ==
On January 14, 2014, Alif had asked for his girlfriend's hand in marriage, Sha Dila Halid (born 1984) who is also his manager after knowing her for a total of four to six years. He married Sha Dila, who is six years older than him on September 15, 2014, and the ceremony was held at Perdana Felda Hall.

On May 31, 2015, Alif and wife welcomed their firstborn child who was born at Pantai Hospital, Kuala Lumpur. The baby girl was named Alisha Anugerah. On February 2, 2017, Alif shared on his social account media Instagram that he became a father again to another beautiful baby girl. The couple welcomed their second daughter, Ariana Mecca, at Pantai Hospital, Kuala Lumpur.

On November 17, 2018, Alif was a participant in Ironman race for the first time at Pantai Cenang on Langkawi Island. The Ironman 70.3 is also dubbed the Half Ironman, which covers half the distance of the actual annual triathlon race.

Alif and his wife Sha Dila welcomes their third child, a boy named Muhammad ‘Ali, exactly on what would have been Alif’s 29th birthday on September 19, 2019.

== Discography ==
=== Album ===
Year	Album	Track listing	Notes
2009	Nakal (Naughty)	"Jangan Nakal"; "Cinta Tergadai"; "Cukup Indah"; "Lagi Lagi Cinta"; "Satu Garis"; "Katamu"; "Akan Tiba"; "Jangan Nakal" (minus one)	
2011	Lelaki Seperti Aku (Guy Like Me)	"Lelaki Seperti Aku"; "Abdul"; "Pendusta; "Rapuh"; "Dalam Sunyi"; "There We Go"; "Timeless" (featuring Julia Abueva); "Lelaki Seperti Aku" (minus one); "Abdul" (minus one); "Timeless" (minus one)	
2013	Definisi (Definition)	"Gadis Tiga Bulan"; "Kerna Dia"; "Kesempatan Kedua"; "Nona Jakarta"; "Akhiri Penantianku"; "Bila"; "Sliding Doors"; "Setiap Hari" (with Rap version); "Apa Kurangnya Aku"	

=== Singles ===
Year	Single	Peak chart positions	Album	Notes
Year	Single	RIM Charts	Album	Notes
2006	"Khayal"	–	Non-album single	
2009	"Jangan Nakal"	–	Nakal	
2009	"Akan Tiba"	–	Nakal	Soundtrack for TV series Rona Roni Makaroni
2009	"Cukup Indah"	–	Nakal	
2009	"Kau Pergi"	–	Non-album single	Soundtrack for TV series Delima
2011	"Lelaki Seperti Aku"	–	Lelaki Seperti Aku	
2011	"Pendusta"	–	Lelaki Seperti Aku	
2013	"Akhiri Penantianku"	–	Definisi	
2013	"Bila"	–	Definisi	
2013	"Kesempatan Kedua"	–	Definisi	
2015	"Sehati Sejiwa"	–	Non-album single	Official theme song for 2015-2017 National Day
2016	"Selamanya Cinta"	–	My Journey	Duet with Shila Amzah. The soundtrack for TV series Suri Hati Mr. Pilot
2016	"Jangan Menghina"	–	Non-album single	With Inteam & Nocturnal Voice.
2017	"Sesungguhnya Aku"	1	Non-album single	Soundtrack for TV series Red Velvet
2017	"Jatuh Cinta"	–	Non-album single	Soundtrack for film Kau Yang Satu
2018	"Sebenarnya"	–	Non-album single	Duet with Siti Nordiana. The soundtrack for TV series Klik! Pengantin Musim Salju
2019	"Sesungguhnya"	–	Non-album single	Duet with Raihan
2019	"I Want You To Love Me"	–	Non-album single	
2020	"Damba Cinta Mu"	–	Non-album single	Duet with Raihan
2020	"Malaysia Prihatin"	–	Non-album single	Duet with Syamel, Siti Sarah dan Aina Abdul. Official theme song for 2020 National Day
2021	"Anugerah Terindah"	–	Non-album single	Duet with The Locos
2022	"Toxic"	–	Non-album single	Duet with The Locos
2022	"Bismillah"	–	Non-album single	Duet with The Locos & Raihan
2022	"25 Rasul"	–	Non-album single	Duet with The Locos & Raihan
2022	"Puji Pujian"	–	Non-album single	Duet with The Locos & Raihan
2022	"Assolatuwassalam"	–	Non-album single	Duet with The Locos & Raihan
2022	"Rayuan Rindu"	–	Non-album single	Duet with The Locos & Raihan
2022	"LebihXSempurna"	–	Non-album single	Duet with The Locos & Diandra Arjunaidi
2022	"Isteri"	–	Non-album single	Duet with The Locos
2022	"Hey"	–	Non-album single	Duet with The Locos
2023	"Kau Aku Satu"	–	Non-album single	Duet with The Locos

== Filmography ==
=== Film ===
Year	Title	Role	Notes
2010	Aku Masih Dara	Himself	Cameo appearance
2016	Usin UFO		
2016	Aliff Dalam 7 Dimensi	Naim	
2021	Sa Balik Baju	Irfan	
2022	Rasuk	Nazmi	
2022	Seratus	Public Toilet Users 1	Cameo appearance
2023	Pulau	Ben	
2024	Anak Perjanjian Syaitan 2	Ustaz Taha	
2024	Housekeeping	Johan	
2024	Reeza GTR	Reeza	

=== Television series ===
Year	Title	Role	TV channel	Notes
2008–2009	Dendam	Amir	TV3	
2011	Suria Di Cordoba	Rudy	Astro Prima	
2012	Syukur Allah	Fathul Bariq	TV Alhijrah	
2016	Tundukkan Playboy Itu	Farhan Badriz	TV3	
2016	Dia Semanis Honey	Ahnaf Wafiy	Astro Ria	
2016	Dia Semanis Honeymoon	Ahnaf Wafiy	Astro Ria	
2016	Suri Hati Mr. Pilot	Ahnaf Wafiy	Astro Ria	Cameo
2017	Hikayat Cinta Si Pematah Hati	Rayyan Rayqarl	Astro Ria	
2017	Ben 10	Tim Buktu	Cartoon Network	Voice role for Malay-dubbed (guest star – special episode on June 17)
2017	Red Velvet	Izzat	Astro Ria	
2018	Klik! Pengantin Musim Salju	Adam Putra	Astro Ria	
2019	PIA	Zafran	TV3	
2020	Famili Spy	Inspektor Daniel	Astro Ceria	
2021	Penjara Janji	Rizan	TV3	
2022	Risik Pada Hati	Adam	TV3	
2023	Bukan Sekadar Lafaz	Hudzaifah	TV3	

=== Television movie ===
Year	Title	Role	TV channel	Notes
2011	Lari Sayang Lari	Hakimi	Astro Ria	
2014	Mat Gedebe	Mat Gedebe	TV9	
2015	Husin Peninglah	Husin	TV9	
2016	Dia Semanis Honey Raya	Ahnaf Wafiy	Astro Ria	
2017	Memori Pajeri Nanas	Chef Armand	Astro First Exclusive	
2017	Inayah	Inspector Jamal	Astro Mustika HD	
2018	The Hantus	Fahmi	Astro First Exclusive	
2019	Geng Big Stage Beraya	Alif	Astro Ria	
2019	Derita Pia	Zafran	TV3	
2019	Geng	Jefri	Astro First Exclusive	
2020	Rindu Cinta Zulaikha	Asraf	TV1	
2022	Kerana Binti Abdullah	Noah	TV1	Also as co-producer
2024	Town Mall 2	Zairul	Tonton	

=== Theater ===
Year	Title	Role	Notes
2004	Peter Pan The Lost Boys		
2017	Dia Semanis Honey The Musical	Ahnaf Wafiy	

=== Television ===
Year	Title	Role	TV channel	Notes
2007	Remaja	Host	TV3	
2009–2011	Idola Kecil	Host	TV9	
2012	Sini Motor	Host	TVi	
2012	Kenangan Mengusik Jiwa	Host	TV1	
2013	Nak Ke Mana Kita? (Season 2)	Host	TV Alhijrah	
2014	Bas Pintar	Host	TV3	
2014–2015	Suka Lattew	Host	Astro Maya HD	with Shahrol Shiro
2015–2016	MeleTOP Kebaboom	Host	Astro Ria	with Shahrol Shiro
2016	Clever Girl Malaysia	Host	TV3	
2016	Akademi Fantasia (AF 2016)	Host	Astro Ria	with Zizan Razak
2017	Rockanova	Host	Astro Maya HD	with Sherry Alhadad
2017	Sembang Sahur	Invited Host	TV3	with Aisya Hasnaa and Gambit Saifullah
2017	Insta Raya	Main Artist	TV2	with Siti Nordiana
2017	Clever Girl Malaysia (Season 2)	Host	TV3	
2018	Anugerah Juara Lagu ke-32	Host	TV3	with Sherry Alhadad
2018	It's Alif!	Host	NTV7	
2018	#Baikpunya	Host	Astro Ria	
2018–2022	Big Stage	Host	Astro Ria	with Sherry Alhadad
2019	Anugerah Juara Lagu ke-33	Host	TV3	with Sherry Alhadad
2019	Bintang Minggu Ini (Season 2)	Main Artist	Astro Ria	Episode on January 27
2021–2022	Muzik Muzik	Host	TV3	with Sissy Imann
2021	I Can See Your Voice Malaysia (season 4)	Judge	TV3	
2022	Sepahtu Reunion Live	Cameo	Astro Warna	Episode: "Hanya Aku Cinta Kau Seorang"
2022	Wassup Bro?	Host	Astro Ria	
2022	Anugerah Juara Lagu ke-36	Host	TV3	with Nabila Huda
