= See You or Never =

Single by Shila Amzah

from the album My Journey
- Released: 21 May 2015 (Digital); 22 April 2015 (First live performance)
- Recorded: December 2014-January 2015; Shilala (HK) Limited
- Genre: mandopop
- Length: 4:40
- Label: Shilala (HK) Limited
- Songwriters: Shila Amzah, Liao Yu
- Producer: Shila Amzah

Shila Amzah singles chronology
"Tian Shen Ji" (2014)	"See You or Never" (2015)	"Goodbye" (2015)

Music video
- "See You or Never" on YouTube

"再見不再見" (Pinyin: Zaijian Bu Zaijian, English: See You or Never) is a Mandopop song recorded by Malaysian singer-songwriter Shila Amzah for her 2016 debut Chinese album, My Journey. The song was written by Liao Yu and composed by Shila. It was released on May 28, 2015, by Shilala (HK) Limited. The writer of this song was inspired to write "See You or Never" after hearing Shila's sad love story: does she really want to leave her boyfriend or not. Shila said that this song was unique as the song doesn't have an ending (the song ended with "Zaijian Bu Zaijian", questioning herself again).

First performed during her 2015 Shila Amzah: The Symbol of Love, International Press Conference. The song was officially released at Weibo Music on 21 May 2015. She described the song as "The song is about a girl considering letting go of her boyfriend or not. This is a love story. If you understand the lyrics, you'll cry".

== Composition and lyrics ==
At four minutes and forty seconds, "See You or Never" is a song with moderately slow and mid-fast tempo. The song was written by Liao Yu and composed by Shila.

== Release and promotion ==
The song was first performed during her 2015 Shila Amzah: The Symbol of Love, International Press Conference at Mira Hotel, Hong Kong. The song was also an instant commercial success, and was the first song in Shila's career to peak at number one on Billboard of Metro Radio Station Hong Kong, and the first song to hold the top spot for more than one week at Weibo Music (released on 21 May 2015) making her single had heard via Weibo Music over 1 million in just 2 days.

== Live performance ==
Apart from the debut of the song during the 2015 Shila Amzah: The Symbol of Love, International Press Conference at Mira Hotel, Hong Kong, the song was also performed during the Shila Amzah Exclusive Showcase Live in Singapore.

== Official Music Video ==
The Official Music Video was premiered on the Astro Ria Syawal Shila Shanghai, on 22 July 2015. On 25 July 2015, she released her Official MV at her official YouTube account. A new version of the MV was released by Vie Media, Shila's International PR and Global Strategies on 23 July 2015. This MV was also directed by Raja Harith from BluBlack Production and recorded at Guangzhou, China.

== Format and track listing ==
Digital download

1 "再见不再见" – 4:40
