= CID 3278 =

Malaysian police TV series

- Genre: Police procedural; action; crime fiction; drama; thriller; mystery
- Created by: Rosyam Nor
- Written by: Akbar Hashim
- Directed by: Silver Chung
- Starring: Rosyam Nor; Kamal Affandi Hashim; Faizal Yusof; Azman Nor; Salina Saibi; Along Eyzendy; Jesse Lim; Azmi Hassan; Jayamara Raj Nadarajan
- Opening theme: "CID 3278" by M. Nasir
- Country of origin: Malaysia
- Original language: Malay
- No. of seasons: 2
- No. of episodes: 52

Production
- Executive producer: Julia Juhasu
- Producers: Rosyam Nor; Runika Mohd Yusof
- Production location: Malaysia
- Running time: 42 minutes
- Production company: Suhan Movies & Trading

Original release
- Network: TV9
- Release: 9 August 2006 – 26 September 2007

CID 3278 is a Malaysian police procedural action drama series produced by Suhan Movies & Trading, which was aired on TV9 from 9 August 2006 to 26 September 2007. It stars Kamal Affandi Hashim, Faizal Yusof, Salina Saibi, Along Eyzendy and Jesse Lim with Rosyam Nor making a special appearance. The series' theme song was composed and performed by M. Nasir.

== Cast ==
=== Main characters ===
Season 1 (2006-2007)

- Kamal Affandi Hashim as ASP Wahab, leader of the CID 3278 squad
- Faizal Yusof as Inspector Azri
- Azman Nor as Detective Corporal Nasir
- Salina Saibi as Inspector Rita
- Along Eyzendy (known as Eyzandy Aziz) as Detective Eddy
- Jesse Lim as Detective Sergeant Chan but episode 7 he dies shot by Ray
- Azmi Hassan as Detective Helmi
- Jayamara Raj Nadarajan as Detective Mala
- Nazri Spuan sebagai Detective Nazri

Season 2 (2007-2008)

- Kamal Affandi Hashim as ASP Wahab, leader of the CID 3278 squad
- Khir Mohd Noor as ASP Kamal, ASP Wahab's successor
- Faizal Yusof as Chief Inspector Azri
- Salina Saibi as Inspector Rita
- Azman Nor as Detective Corporal Nasir
- Along Eyzendy as Detective Eddy
- Chin Yee sebagai Detective Cindy
- Nazri Spuan sebagai Detective Nazri
- Azlan Komeng as Jack, Ray's henchman

Guest actor/actress (following each episodes)

- Dian P.Ramlee as Inspector Rita's mother
- Zainuddin Ismail as Inspector Azri's father
- Liyana Jasmay as Inspector Azri's wife
- Zack Kool
- Fizz Fairuz
- Eric Chen
- Kuni Muzaini
- Qazem Nor
- Izreen Azmida
- Roy Azman

=== Special appearance ===
- Rosyam Nor as Ray
- Dato' Ahmad Tarmimi Siregar as Head of the CID KL

== See also ==
- Gerak Khas (TV series) (since 1999)
- Metro Skuad (2012-2013)
- Roda-Roda Kuala Lumpur (1998-1999, 2008-2013)
