= Remaja (magazine) =

Malaysian teen magazine

- Categories: Teenage
- Frequency: Biweekly (1990–2014); Monthly (1983-1990, 2014–2017); Quarterly (2017–2020); Online (2021-present)
- First issue: January 1983
- Final issue: October-December 2020 (print)
- Company: Kumpulan Media Karangkraf Sdn Bhd
- Country: Malaysia
- Based in: Shah Alam
- Language: Malay
- Website: www.remaja.my
- ISSN: 1675-0454

Remaja (Teen) was a Malay monthly magazine for teenagers.

== History ==
It was first published in January 1983.

Every year, Remaja holds Dewi Remaja which started in 1985 and Hero Remaja which started in 1990.
