= HidayahMu =

Single by Shila Amzah
- Released: June 15, 2017
- Recorded: December 2016 – June 2017; NAR Records
- Genre: Islamic, pop
- Length: 3:30
- Label: Shilala (HK) Limited
- Songwriter(s): Shila Amzah
- Producer(s): Helen Yap

Shila Amzah singles chronology
"Selamanya Cinta" (2016)	"HidayahMu" (2017)	"Falling in Love With You" (2017)

"HidayahMu" (Your Guidance) is a single recorded by international Malaysian singer-songwriter Shila Amzah. It was released on June 15, 2017, through her independent recording label and management company, Shilala (HK) Limited. The song was solely written by Shila Amzah and produced by a famous Malaysian record producer, Helen Yap. The single was released in conjunction with the Ramadan month and served as Shila's debut single in Islamic music.

== Format and track listing ==
Digital download
No.	Title	Writer(s)	Producer(s)	Length
1.	"HidayahMu"	Shila Amzah	Helen Yap	3:30
Total length:				3:30

== Credits and personnel ==
Recording and management

- Recorded, mixed and mastered at NAR Records (Kuala Lumpur, Malaysia)
- Shilala (HK) Limited (Hong Kong)

Personnel

- Shila Amzah – lead vocals, writer, composer
- Helen Yap – producer, arranger
- Haslan Hussain – backup vocal
- Juanita Ismail – backup vocal
- Bong Kamal Ali – bass
- Nasran Nawi – strings
- Lim Jae Sern – strings
- Veronika Thoene – strings
- Rizal Halim – musician
- Amir Sulaiman – audio engineer
- Cl Toh – mastering

Credits are adapted from Helen Yap's Instagram post.

== Release history ==
List of radio and release dates with formats and record labels
Country	Date	Format	Label
Worldwide	June 15, 2017	Streaming, digital download	Shilala (HK) Limited
