= Fattah Amin =

Malaysian actor and singer

- فتّاح أمين
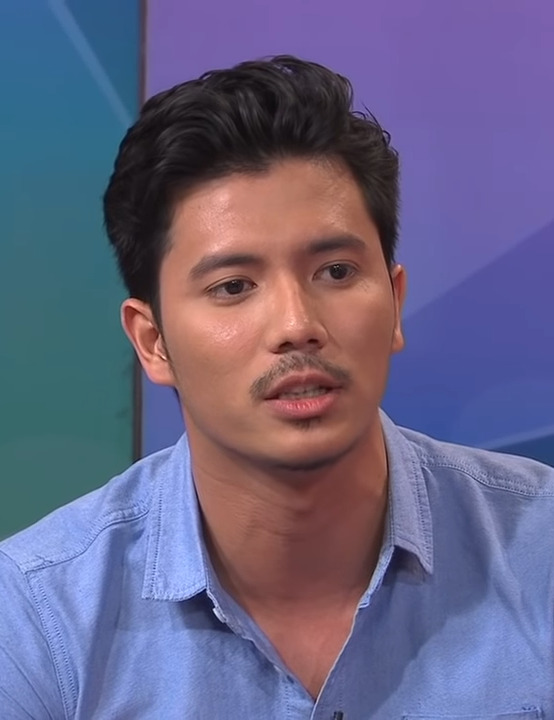
- Amin on MeleTOP
- Born: Abdul Fattah bin Mohd Amin; September 14, 1990 (age 36); Jerantut, Pahang, Malaysia
- Education: Diploma in Creative Technology (Creative Industry Management); Bachelor of Creative Industries Management *Universiti Teknologi MARA (MARA); Universiti Utara Malaysia (UUM)
- Occupations: Actor, singer, director
- Years active: 2011–present
- Notable work: Television; Playboy Itu Suami Aku; Hello, Mr. Perfect! Plan Cinta Tak Jadi; Bencinta; Suri Hati Mr. Pilot; Hero Seorang Cinderella; My Coffee Prince
- Spouse(s): Fazura (m. 2017; div. 2024) Amira Othman (m. 2025)
- Children: 2
- Musical career
- Years active: 2013–present

Abdul Fattah Mohd Amin (born 14 September 1990) is a Malaysian actor and singer. He is known for playing as Adrian, the main character in the drama Playboy Itu Suami Aku. He also appeared in Bencinta, Plan Cinta Tak Jadi and the Indonesian telemovies I Pursue Love To Malaysia and From Hater To Lover. He continued his career as Captain Ejaz Fakhri alongside Neelofa in the play Suri Hati Mr. Pilot and Tengku Ian Uzzam alongside Fazura in the play Hero Seorang Cinderella.

== Personal life ==
Fattah Amin married actress Fazura on 27 November 2017 and divorce after 7 years of marriage. Fattah Amin married singer Amira Othman on 14 September 2025.

Fattah Amin completed his secondary education at SMK Desa Tun Hussein Onn in Kuala Lumpur. He initially pursued higher education at Universiti Teknologi MARA (UiTM) before enrolling at Universiti Utara Malaysia (UUM).However, he did not finish his studies. In one of the semesters, he achieved a perfect 4.0 GPA, earning him a place on the Dean's List (Anugerah Dekan).

== Filmography ==
=== Film ===
Year	Title	Role	Notes
2014	Manisnya Cinta Di Cappadoccia	Farhan	
2018	KL Special Force	Zul	
2020	Miimaland	Ariel	
2022	Mat Kilau	Awang	
2022	Deleted: Akan Ku Jejak!	Inspector Aron	
2022	Abang Long Fadil 3	Himself	Cameo in Picture
2024	Trinil: Kembalikan Tubuhku	Yusof	Indonesia movie
2024	Pendekar Awang: Darah Indera Gajah	Awang	
2025	Kulit Wayang	Pak Lee	

=== Television series ===
Year	Title	Role	TV channel
2013	Memberku Hawa	Faliq	Astro Ria
2013	Kerana Sarah	Edika	TV3
2013	Cinta Jannah	Haki	TV3
2013	Playboy Itu Suami Aku	Raja Adrian Benjamin	TV3
2014	Merah Bukan Jambu	Merah	TV2
2014	Cinta Ibadah	Hafiz	Astro Prima
2015	Nasuha	Irfan	TV9
2015	Bencinta	Nabil	TV3
2015	Strawberi & Karipap (Season 2)	Azam	Astro Ceria
2015	Cinta Dari Marikh	Aiman	TV2
2015	Plan Cinta Tak Jadi	Anas	Astro Ria
2015	Hello, Mr. Perfect!	Izzul Islam	TV3
2016	Kak Marr	Himself	TV3
2016	Bodyguard	Faris	TV3
2016	Ketupat Palas Mr Handsome	Kruzaimi	TV3
2016	Suri Hati Mr. Pilot	Kapten Ejaz Fakhri	Astro Ria
2016–2017	Gerak Khas	Inspector Haikal	TV2
2017	Hero Seorang Cinderella	Tengku Ian Uzzam	Astro Ria
2017	My Coffee Prince	Raikal	Astro Ria
2018	Dia Anak Jeneral	Zakhif	TV2
2018	Isteri Bukan Untuk Disewa	Noah Ryzal	Astro Ria
2019	Cetera Hati Diya	Zahil Hariz	TV3
2020	Pink Smile	Areeq Haji Mahdi / Kaz	TV3
2021	Ganjil	Amry	Viu
2022	Khilaf Asmara	Luqman Hazim	TV3
2022	Kamcing	Aariz	Sooka
2024	Hero Seorang Cinderella 2	Tengku Ian Uzzam	Astro Ria
2024	Lelaki Melayu Terakhir	Ustaz Jazlan	TV3
2025	Keluarga Itu	Ansara	TV3
2025	Bidaah	Hambali	Viu

=== Telemovie ===
Year	Title	Role	TV channel	Notes
2013	Arah Ke Kuburmu		Astro Prima	
2013	Asparagus	Firash	TV2	
2014	Aidil Click	Adrian	TV1	
2014	Ku Kejar Cintaku Ke Malaysia	Ashraf	Astro Prima	
2014	From Hater To Lover	Amri	RTV	
2015	Aku Tunggu Kau Ni	Kamal	Astro Prima	
2015	Manisnya Bulan Madu	Mirza	TV3	
2015	Yang Mana Satu	Azhar	TV9	
2015	Alien Planet Cinta	Dinosaur	Astro Ria	
2015	Awaklah Imam Saya	Shahidan Azmi	Astro Ria	
2015	Pelita Panjut Untuk Mertua	Azudin	TV3	
2015	Cik Siti	Awang	TV3	
2016	Hello Mr. Perfect Raya	Izzul Islam	TV3	
2016	Raya Kami	Rayyan	TV3	
2016	Dendam Manisa	Rosman	TV3	
2017	Bayangan Emilia	Ungku Mahmud	Astro Ria	
2017	Suri Hati Mr Pilot Raya	Kapten Ejaz Fakhri	Astro Ria	
2017	Wanita Terindah	Fahim Aiman	Astro First Exclusive	
2019	Kau Selalu Di Hatiku	Azlam	TV1	
2020	Kisah Seram Hospital	Adam	Astro Citra	
2022	Menantu Atau Isteri Untuk Abah	Talib	Astro Ria	
2022	Matahari Tak Bercahaya	Shazan	TV3	
2023	Latah Fighter	Dani	Astro Warna	
2024	Larian Terakhir	Haziq	Unifi TV	
2025	11 Cinta Sebelum Kamu	Ray	Unifi TV	
2025	Rapun	Anan	Astro Ria	
2025	Kasih Tak Minta		TV Okey	
2025	Noktah Dosa	Malik	TV3	As director

=== Television ===
Year	Title	Role	TV channel
2015	Ketuk Ketuk Ramadan 15	Himself (Invited Artist)	TV1
2017	The House (season 4)	Himself with Alvin Chong	Astro Ria
2021	SUKSES 4.0	Host	Astro Awani

== Discography ==
Singles
Year	Title
2013	"Darjat"
2013	"Getar Jiwa"
2013	"Sumpah Aku Cinta Padamu"
2013	"Love"
2015	"Hero Untukmu" (Feat with Sherry Ibrahim & RJ)
2017	"Wanita Terakhir"
2017	"Cinderella" (Feat with Nur Fazura)
2017	"Wanita Terindah"
2017	"1234U"
2018	"Syawal Kali Ini"
2018	"Isterimewa"
2019	"Paling Sempurna" (Feat with Nur Fazura)
2020	"Bebas"
2020	"Sinar Selawat"
2021	"Hamba" (Feat with Kmy Kmo)
2022	"Padamu"
2024	"Bertahan Demi Cinta" (Feat with Nur Fazura)
2025	"Lelaki Terakhir"

Music Videos
Year	Title
2015	Sorry-Sorry Sayangku (Nomad)
2017	Bisa Apa (Fazura)
2018	"Syawal Kali Ini"
2018	"Isterimewa"
2020	"Bebas"
2020	"Sinar Selawat"
2022	"Padamu"
2025	"Bila Nak Kahwin?" (Amira Othman)

== Awards and nominations ==
Year	Awards	Category	Nominated work	Result
2011/2012	Hero Remaja	1st place Winner	—N/a	Won
2016	3rd Anugerah MeleTOP Era	Fesyen MeleTOP	—N/a	Nominated
2016	3rd Anugerah Drama Festival Kuala Lumpur	Aktor Pilihan	Hello, Mr. Perfect!	Nominated
2016	3rd Anugerah Drama Festival Kuala Lumpur	Pasangan Pilihan with Ruhainies	Hello, Mr. Perfect!	Nominated
2016	Anugerah Pilihan Online	Lelaki Tampan Pilihan Dnars	—N/a	Nominated
2016	29th Bintang Popular Berita Harian Award	Pelakon TV Lelaki Popular	—N/a	Nominated
2016	Anugerah Stail EH!	Selebriti Lelaki Paling Seksi	—N/a	Won
2016	3rd Anugerah Melodi	Personaliti Drama Melodi	—N/a	Won
2016	Anugerah Telenovela	Pelakon Baharu Paling Popular (Lelaki)	Hello, Mr. Perfect!	Won
2016	Maskulin Choice	Best Issue – August	—N/a	Won
2017	Anugerah Throwbaek Drama	Hero Throwbaek	Suri Hati Mr. Pilot	Won
2017	Anugerah Throwbaek Drama	Kapel Throwbaek (with Neelofa)	Suri Hati Mr. Pilot	Won
2017	4th Anugerah MeleTOP Era	Pelakon TV MeleTOP	Suri Hati Mr. Pilot	Won
2017	4th Anugerah MeleTOP Era	Bintang Online MeleTOP	—N/a	Won
2017	4th Anugerah MeleTOP Era	Fesyen MeleTOP	—N/a	Won
2017	4th Anugerah MeleTOP Era	Anugerah Top Top MeleTOP (Lelaki)	Suri Hati Mr. Pilot	Won
2017	Anugerah Buku Negara	Buku Popular	99 Kata-Kata #Qalifmoden	Won
2017	Anugerah Stail EH!	Selebriti Lelaki Paling Seksi	—N/a	Nominated
2017	Anugerah Stail EH!	Selebriti Lelaki Paling Bergaya	—N/a	Won
2017	30th Bintang Popular Berita Harian Award	Gandingan Serasi Drama (with Neelofa)	Suri Hati Mr. Pilot	Won
2017	30th Bintang Popular Berita Harian Award	Artis Sensasi	—N/a	Won
2017	30th Bintang Popular Berita Harian Award	Bintang Paling Popular	—N/a	Won
2017	InTrend Gala 2017	Wajah Sampul Popular	—N/a	Won
2017	Hot FM Top Hot	Penyanyi Lelaki Hot	—N/a	Nominated
2017	Hot FM Top Hot	Penyanyi Baru Hot	—N/a	Nominated
2017	Anugerah Telenovela	Pelakon Lelaki Popular	Suri Hati Mr. Pilot	Won
2017	Anugerah Telenovela	Pelakon Lelaki Sensasi	—N/a	Won
2018	5th Anugerah MeleTOP Era	Fesyen MeleTOP	—N/a	Nominated
2018	5th Anugerah MeleTOP Era	Pelakon TV MeleTOP	Hero Seorang Cinderella	Nominated
2018	Anugerah Telenovela	Pelakon Telenovela Lelaki Popular	Hero Seorang Cinderella	Pending
2018	Anugerah Telenovela	Pelakon Filem Lelaki Popular	Wanita Terindah	Pending
2018	31st Bintang Popular Berita Harian Award	Pelakon TV Lelaki Popular	—N/a	Won
2018	31st Bintang Popular Berita Harian Award	Pasangan Serasi Drama (bersama Nur Fazura)	—N/a	Won
2018	31st Bintang Popular Berita Harian Award	Artis Sensasi	—N/a	Nominated
