= Neelofa =

Malaysian actress, television presenter, commercial model and entrepreneur (born 1989)

- نيلوفر
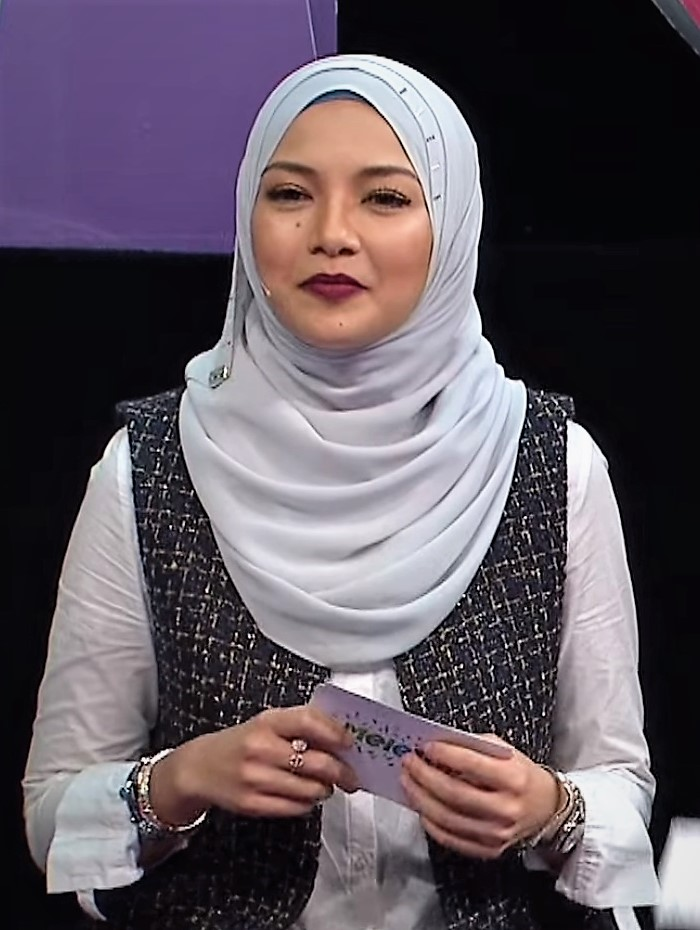
- Neelofa in 2016
- Born: Noor Neelofa binti Mohd Noor; 10 February 1989 (age 37); Pasir Mas, Kelantan, Malaysia
- Education: Bachelor of International Trade and Marketing
- Alma mater: Sunway University; MRSM Langkawi
- Occupations: Celebrity; Host Television; Commercial Model; Businessperson
- Years active: 2009–present
- Known for: Dewi Remaja
- Spouse: Haris Ismail (m. 2021)
- Children: 2
- Parents: Mohd Noor (Father); Datin Noor Kartini Noor Mohamed (Mother); Dato' Abdul Halim Khan Lall Khan (Stepfather)
- Family: Noor Sara Dinna; Noor Nabila; Noor Nellisa; Mohd Aqief; Putri Nur Athira; Nur Athisha; Nur Ameera; Mohamed Faliq; Mohamed Firdaus

Noor Neelofa Mohd Noor (born 10 February 1989) is a Malaysian actress, television presenter, commercial model and entrepreneur. She rose to fame when participated in a drama queen competition, Dewi Remaja, winning the Dewi Remaja 2009/10 title organised by the Malaysian teen magazine, Remaja. She received her Bachelor International Trade and Marketing education at Sunway University College. Neelofa was named on the Forbes 30 Under 30 Asia in 2017. Beyond her entertainment career, she has been involved in multiple business ventures and launched Naelofar Hijab.

== Early life ==
Neelofa was born in Pasir Mas, Kelantan and is of Persian, Pakistani and Malay descent.

Neelofa studied in Maktab Rendah Sains MARA Langkawi, and achieved excellent results. After graduating, she studied and took A Levels (June 2007 – June 2009) for two years at KDU University College. Her dream was to further her studies in the United States of America, but her family did not approve of her decision. Neelofa then pursued her studies at Sunway University in Bachelor of International Business & Marketing.

== Career ==
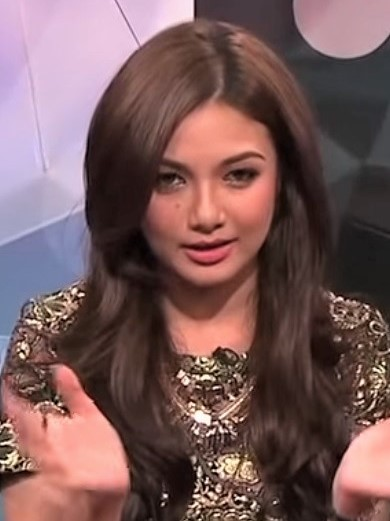
Neelofa on MeleTop (2014)

Neelofa is a winner in Dewi Remaja (Miss Teen Malaysia) 2009/2010. She appeared in Kau Yang Terindah as Alisya and is a host of the television programs MeleTOP and Nona.

In 2014, she took acting classes at the New York Film Academy. Alongside Nabil Ahmad, Neelofa was also a host for a Malaysian television programme, MeleTOP aired on Astro Ria. She announced on the series that she was resigning as the host in December 2019 after seven years.

Positive reviews of her were given in the press and from the public for her acting in Lukisan Takdir and Wan Embong.

== Personal life ==
Neelofa's grandfather, Noor Mohamed Mohammad Din died on 20 November 2018 at the age of 83, but his cause of death is unknown. She is a cousin of celebrity chef, Adam Didam who died on 19 May 2019 due to lung infection. On 15 October 2020, Neelofa decided to wear niqab.

On 27 March 2021, she married televangelist and actor, Haris Ismail who is six years of her junior. Their first child, a son called Muhammad Bilal, was born on 29 January 2022. Their second child, a son called Abdullah Abbas, was born on 11 July 2023.

== Discography ==
=== Single ===
Year	Title	Notes
2023	"Jodoh Ajal Rezeki"	with Faizal Tahir & Haris Ismail

== Filmography ==
=== Film ===
Year	Title	Role	Notes
2012	Azura	Azura	Debut film appearances
2012	SAM: Saya Amat Mencintaimu	Zura	
2012	Hantu Kapcai	Khadijah	
2013	Lemak Kampung Santan	Tiqa	
2014	Faithful	Sayang	Short film
2014	Dollah Superstar	Farra	
2015	Pilot Cafe	Sharmila	

=== TV series ===
Year	Title	Role	TV channel
2011	Kasih Najihah	Najihah	TV9
2011	Sumpah Anjasmoro	Wardina	TV3
2011	Jiwa Dan Lara	Lara	TV3
2011	Kitab Cinta	Mila	TV Alhijrah
2011	Tahajjud Cinta	Suraya	TV3
2012	Kau Yang Terindah	Alisya	TV3
2012	Amukan Pocong	Emma	TV3
2012	Syahadat Cinta	Zainab	TV Alhijrah
2013	Karoot Komedia X (Season 2)	Nurse	Astro Warna
2016	Suri Hati Mr. Pilot	Warda Erina	Astro Ria
2017	Red Velvet	Helena	Astro Ria
2018	Ti Amo, Sweetheart 100 Hari!	Malissa	Astro Ria

=== Telemovie ===
Year	Title	Role	TV channel
2011	Jemmah Kolesterol	Dr. Najihah	TV3
2011	Pusing Beraya	Mariana	TV3
2011	Sumpah Anjasmoro	Wardina	TV3
2011	Korban Tak Jadi	Mariana	TV3
2012	Ijam Non Yankee	Lin	TV3
2012	Dibah Lori	Dibah	TV3
2012	Nyanyian Sakaratul Maut	Nurain	TV3
2012	Janji Jujur Sepi	Dhea	TV9
2012	Tersalah Cinta	Cinta	TV3
2012	Cahaya Insaniah	Nora	TVi
2015	Lukisan Takdir	Rita Anna	TV3
2015	Wan Embong	Wan Embong	TV3
2017	Suri Hati Mr Pilot Raya	Warda Erina	Astro Ria
2020	6 Hari	Linda	Astro Citra

=== Host ===
Year	Title	TV channel	Notes
2011	Sekolahku Hebat	Astro Ceria	
2012	Paparazzi	KRU TV	
2012	Anugerah Skrin	TV3	with Awal Ashaari
2012–2014	Nona	TV3	with Fara Fauzana
2012–2019	MeleTOP	Astro Ria	with Nabil Ahmad
2013	Dapur Panas	TV3	
2014	MeleTOP Era Awards	Astro Ria	with Nabil Ahmad and AC Mizal
2014	HLive! Launching Ceremony	Astro Ria	with Nabil Ahmad and Aznil Nawawi
2015	MeleTop Era Awards	Astro Ria	
2015	NeelofaTV	YouTube	
2016	MeleTop Era Awards	Astro Ria	
2016	#ilofayou	YouTube	
2020	Next To Neelofa	Astro Ria	
2021	N to N	Astro Ria	with Nabil Ahmad
2022	Next To Neelofa 2	Astro Ria	
2024	Next To Neelofa Raya	Astro Ria	

=== TV appearance ===
Year	Title	Notes	TV channel
2016	Yeke?	Guest, Episode: "Princes and Princesses"	TV3
2016	Melodi Raya 2016	Guest	TV3
2016	Motif Viral	Episode:?	Astro Ria
2016	Le'PakNil	Episode:6	Astro Ria
2016	Astro Ceria Popstar Raya 2016	Guest Host	Astro Ceria
2016	Hlive Exclusive with Neelofa	Guest	Astro Ria
2016	Akademi Fantasia 2016 Final	Guest With Suri Hati Mr.Pilot Cast	Astro Ria
2016	Gegar Vaganza (Season 3)	Week ke-2-Guest	Astro Ria
2016	Akak-Akak Sangat	Ep: ?? Guest With Fattah Amin & Michael Ang	Astro Prima
2016	HLive Special Suri Hati Mr. Pilot	Guest with Fattah Amin	Astro Ria
2016	Motif Viral	Episode: "Suri Hati Mr. Pilot"	Astro Ria
2016	Taste Selebriti	Episode: "Kelantan"	Astro Mustika HD
2016	Inspirasi Hlive	Episode: "Neelofa"	Astro Ria
2016	Alhamdulillah	Episode:	TV Alhijrah
2016	Imbasan Dr Muhaya	Episode:	TV Alhijrah
2017	Maharaja Lawak Mega 2017	Judge	Astro Warna
2022	Nona	Guest host with Amyra Rosli	TV3
2022	Wanita Hari Ini	Episode: "Transisi Kehidupan"	TV3
2022	Sembang Viral (Season 2)	Episode: "Kesan Hentaman Netizen"	TV9

=== Theatre ===
Year	Title	Role
2014	Bahayanya Wanita	Thai Girl

=== Music video appearance ===
Year	Song title	Singer
2010	"Ku Bukan Aku"	Tilu
2010	"Fragile"	Seven Collar T-Shirt
2011	"Janji"	Akim Ahmad
2013	"Bila Aku Jatuh Cinta"	Awi Rafael
2015	"Untuk Cinta"	Hafiz Suip (with Adira)

== Bibliography ==
Year	Title	Notes
2016	The Chic Codes	Book launch debut

== Business ventures ==
Outside of showbiz career, Neelofa also involved in several business ventures including contact lens brand Lofalens, health care products Beautea Slim pills, and Muslim women's clothing brand Naelofar Hijab, which is sold through online and retail stores in Selangor and distributors across Malaysia and Singapore.

=== Influencer ===
With more than eight million followers on Instagram, Naelofar has become a fashion icon for many Muslim women who wear the hijab, or 'tudung' as it is referred to in the region of Malaysia and Singapore. She has fronted campaigns for Dior, Lancome and Swarovski, representing modest fashion at shows in New York, Milan and Paris Fashion Week.

She became the first Malaysian to win the 2019 Influencer Awards at Monaco under the Entrepreneur category on 7 October 2019. Each nomination was chosen by a jury, with the nominations coming from all over the world.

On 8 December 2017, AirAsia appointed Neelofa as its new non-executive independent director. Tony Fernandes, the AirAsia Group chief executive officer described Neelofa as "super smart, young and independent". She resigned as director on 19 August 2020 due to "her other personal commitments”.

On 18 December 2020, she received the Business Icon Award during Nona Superwoman Award 2020 presentation by the women's magazine Nona.

=== Naelofar Hijab ===
Neelofa founded and helmed NH Prima Sdn Bhd as its director since 2014. Her hijab brand, "Naelofar Hijab" is sold in more than 37 countries including Singapore, Brunei, Indonesia, Australia, UAE, United Kingdom and Europe.

In June 2017, the brand took on new heights when it collaborated with AirAsia to design hijab for female pilots of AirAsia and AirAsia X.

In conjunction with her birthday celebration in 2018, Neelofa launched a turban range, “Be Lofa Turban” at Zouk KL. The new turban line was sold out in less than 24 hours after launching. However, she received backlash from Internet commentators for holding her product launch in the nightclub. On 1 March 2018, she has issued a public statement of apology saying "I would like to sincerely apologise for causing stress and negative sentiments on the selection of the venue."

In 2019, she has partnered with Starbucks to produce the Starbucks x Naelofar exclusive collection which retailed only at Starbucks. Within five years, she has sold more than 10 million hijabs.

=== Nilofa Group ===
In December 2019, Neelofa introduced the Nilofa brand with the banana milk as its first product, to the Malaysian market under the Nilofa Group name. An advertisement of the product claimed that the milk would have benefits such as reducing obesity, lowering high blood pressure, increasing metabolism rate and removing toxins from the body. UK-based general surgeon Dr Nur Amalina Che Bakri used Twitter to call out these claims false advertising.

Neelofa's response was that the advertising was published by the marketing agency without her company's approval. She kept her team small and had outsourced the marketing. The controversy led Malaysian Ministry of Health (MOH) to visit the factory to investigate the processes of the milk product behind the claims. MOH found no major issues with the packaging but gave some recommendations concerning packaging the product to clearly communicate the product as a banana milk.

In 2020, Chatime collaboration with Neelofa to launch their new menu Nilofa Dalgonana. The drink are made from her own banana milk. In March 31, 2021 Neelofa and her husband PU Riz get caught by travelling to Langkawi for honeymoon but she denied it because she travelling to Langkawi for a business trip not for honeymoon. She says, she and her husband will attend for launch a new branch Chatime at Langkawi.

=== The Noor ===
In 2021, her launch her own Islamic content mobile application called The Noor. Beside that Noor collaboration with Fipper.

== Endorsements ==
Year(s)	Product	Notes
2011	Nokia	Mobile Phones
2011	Silkygirl	Cosmetic
2011	Fair & Lovely	Cosmetic
2011	F&N Fruit Tree	Soft Drinks Brand
2012	Avon	Cosmetic
2012	King Koil	Mattress
2012	U2 Watch	Watch
2012	FashionValet	Fashion
2012	Suzuki Swift	Car Brand
2013	LINE	Chat Apps
2014	Airish Miracle	Cosmetic
2015	Lancôme La Nuit Tresor	Perfume
2015	Heaven & Earth	
2015	PLUS Apps	
2016–present	Neelofa Perfume	Perfume
2016–present	Swarovski Jewelry	
2016–present	Bank Rakyat	Bank Rakyat Muslimah Card
2017	Titan Jewelry	Jewelry
2017	Oppo r6	Mobile Phone
2017	Tn50	Youth and Inspirational
2017	Putrajaya Holdings	Property Investment
2017	Lancôme Cosmetics	Cosmetics
2017	yes4g	Mobile Internet
2017	Awesome MaMa	Instant Noodles
2017	Chew n Glow	Health Supplement Product
2020	Chatime	Drinks
2021	Fipper	Slip On

== Philanthropy and endorsement ==
In April 2012, Neelofa alongside Nazim Othman, Fizo Omar, Zoey Rahman, Intan Ladyana and Aiman Hakim Ridza was appointed as the Young Biz Icons for Oxford Centre of Excellence (Oxcell). According to Oxcell, "The appointment of six icons was based on academic success and career development in the arts". Through this program, the celebrity icons will share their experiences throughout involved in the world of business and the arts.

In July 2013, the Malaysian private, free-to-air television channel, TV3 appointed Neelofa along with Adi Putra, Nora Danish, Fiza Sabjahan, Amar Asyraf, Nelydia Senrose, Tasha Shilla and Aiman Hakim Ridza as the ambassador for Anugerah Syawal 2013. According to TV3 "The appointment of these celebrities is to promote programs on television and radio throughout the month of Shawwal."

== Controversies ==
During the wedding ceremony between Neelofa and PU Riz on March 27, 2021, the pictures of the audience sitting close and violating the standard operating procedure (SOP) for controlling COVID-19 infection became contagious and received criticism from the people of the country in general. This caught the attention of the police who opened an investigation paper on the violation under Section 21A of the Prevention and Control of Infectious Diseases Act 1988 (Act 342), and called on the organizers, hotel owners and family members involved to assist in the investigation. Meanwhile, Minister in the Prime Minister's Department (Religious Affairs), Zulkifli Mohamad Al-Bakri who was also present and gave a speech at their wedding ceremony declined to comment further on the collision.

== Awards and nominations ==
Year	Award	Category	Nominated work	Result
2010 / 2011	Dewi Remaja	1st Place Winner	—N/a	Won
2012	Stail EH! Award	New Choices Celebrity	—N/a	Nominated
2012	Stail EH! Award	Sexiest Female Celebrity	—N/a	Nominated
2012	25th Bintang Popular Berita Harian Awards	Most Popular Female New Artist	—N/a	Nominated
2012	16th Skrin Awards	Pantene Shine Award	—N/a	Nominated
2013	26th Bintang Popular Berita Harian Award	Most Popular Film Actress	—N/a	Nominated
2013	26th Bintang Popular Berita Harian Award	Most Popular TV Actress	—N/a	Nominated
2013	26th Bintang Popular Berita Harian Award	Most Popular Female TV Host	—N/a	Nominated
2013	4th Shout! Awards	Favourite TV Personality Award	—N/a	Nominated
2013	2nd Blockbuster Award	Best New Female Performance Award	Hantu Kapcai	Won
2013	2nd Blockbuster Award	Best Female Performance Award	Azura	Nominated
2013	25th Malaysian Film Festival	Best New Actress	Azura	Nominated
2013	1st Melodi Awards	Sensational Celebrity	—N/a	Nominated
2014	27th Bintang Popular Berita Harian Award	Most Popular TV Actress	—N/a	Nominated
2014	27th Bintang Popular Berita Harian Award	Most Popular Female TV Host	—N/a	Won
2014	Stail EH! Awards	Sexiest Women Celebrity	—N/a	Nominated
2015	2nd MeleTOP Era Awards	Most Popular TV Host	MeleTop	Nominated
2015	28th Bintang Popular Berita Harian Award	Most Popular Female TV Host	—N/a	Won
2015	28th Bintang Popular Berita Harian Award	Most Popular Film Actress	—N/a	Nominated
2015	28th Bintang Popular Berita Harian Award	Stailo Female Artist	—N/a	Nominated
2015	19th Skrin Awards	Best Supporting Actress	Pilot Cafe	Nominated
2015	19th Skrin Awards	Shining Star Award	—N/a	Won
2016	3rd MeleTOP Era Awards	Fashion MeleTOP	—N/a	Nominated
2016	MATRADE Outstanding Achievement Awards	Outstanding Achievement Award	Naelofar Hijab	Won
2016	1st Online Choice Awards	Online Choice Young Entrepreneur	Naelofar Hijab	Won
2016	1st Online Choice Awards	Online Choice Fashion Icon	—N/a	Nominated
2016	29th Bintang Popular Berita Harian Award	Most Popular Film Actress	—N/a	Nominated
2016	29th Bintang Popular Berita Harian Award	Most Popular TV Host	—N/a	Won
2016	29th Bintang Popular Berita Harian Award	Most Popular Artiste	—N/a	Won
2016	MATRADE Malaysian Export Aspiration	Export Celebrity Award	Naelofar Hijab	Won
2016	Tribute to Women Malaysia	Business Awards	Naelofar Hijab	Won
2016	3rd Melodi Awards	Melodi Hosting Personality	—N/a	Won
2017	InTrend Gala Night 2017	Most Charming Celebrity	Herself	Won
2017	InTrend Gala Night 2017	Inspiring Woman	Herself	Won
2017	InTrend Gala Night 2017	Iconic Role Model	Herself	Won
2019	Influencer Awards Monaco 2019	Entrepreneur	N/A	Won
