= Faizal Yusup =

Malaysian actor (1978–2011)

- Born: Mohd Faizal bin Yusup; 13 June 1978; Kuala Lumpur, Malaysia
- Died: 1 January 2011 (aged 32); Pusat Rawatan Islam, Selangor
- Resting place: Batu Muda Muslim cemetery, Gombak, Selangor
- Occupation: Actor
- Years active: 2000–2011
- Spouses: Siti Nordiana (m. 2006; div. 2009) Rosmunira Rashid (m. 2010–2011)
- Children: 2
- Relatives: Zulkifli Mohd Yusup (brother)

Mohd Faizal Yusup (13 June 1978 – 1 January 2011) was a Malaysian actor. He appeared in some Malay television series, including Jersi 9, Adamaya, Tiramisu and Manjalara.

Faizal died on 1 January 2011. He is survived by his second wife Rosmunira Rashid who was five months pregnant at the time of his death. He was previously married to singer Siti Nordiana with whom he had a son, Mohd Rayyan Nakhaie.

== Filmography ==
=== Film ===
Year	Title	Role	Notes
2001	Blok 404	Azlan	Debut film appearances
2006	Gong	Didi	Last movie

=== Television series ===
Year	Title	Role	TV Channel	Notes
2006	Syair Untuk Najihah	Syamer	TV1	
2006–2007	CID 3278	Inspector Azri	TV9	
2007	Manjalara	Faryzal (Ryzal)	TV3	
2008	Intan Asmara	Kamal	TV3	
2008–2009	Spa Q (Season 2)	Shah	TV3	
2009	Wadi Unung	Nazir	Astro Prima	
2009	Dua Marhalah	Syamil	Astro Oasis	Special appearance
2009	Tower 13	Joe	TV3	Episode: "Azri/Anjang"
2009	Jongkang Jongkit	Bad	Astro Warna	
2010	Ejen 008		TV3	
2010	Adamaya	Dani	TV3	
2010	Jersi 9	Amran	TV9	
2010–2011	Tiramisu	Alias	TV3	

=== Telemovie ===
Year	Title	Role	TV channel
2003	Neon	Hafiz	VCD
2004	Surat Untuk Bulan	Amin	VCD
2004	Zaharul vs Zarina	Zaharul / Zarina	Astro Ria
2005	Zaharul vs Zarina 2	Zaharul / Zarina	Astro Ria
2006	Guruh Di Langit	Zairul	TV1
2007	Cinta Si Rempit		TV3
2009	Memoir Aisyah	Zul	TV3
2009	Pesan Mak	Kamil	TV2
2010	Wak	Radin Khairul Nizam (Wak Ijam)	TV2
2010	Cikgu Badar		TV3
2010	Gulai Labu Ikan Masin	Kamal	TV2
2011	Jangan Hantar Aku Ke Neraka	Hamzi	TV9

== Awards and nominations ==
Year	Award	Category	Nominated work	Result	Ref.
2011	Anugerah Skrin 2011	Best Actor in a Supporting Role	Jangan Hantar Aku ke Neraka	Won	
