= Wardina Safiyyah =

Malaysian television presenter

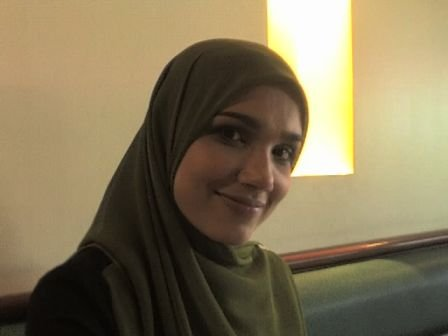
- Born: Wardina Safiyyah Fadlullah Wilmot; 5 June 1979 (age 47); Kuala Lumpur, Malaysia
- Occupations: Actress, model, TV host
- Years active: 1997–2013
- Spouse: Ikhwan Johari (m. 2002)
- Children: 3

Wardina Safiyyah Fadlullah Wilmot (born 5 June 1979) is a Malaysian actress, model, and TV host. She is of Australian and Acehnese descent.

== Personal life ==
Wardina is the second child of six siblings. Her Australian father, Fadlullah Wilmot, was invited by Tun Abdul Razak the former Prime Minister of Malaysia to work in Malaysia. Mr Wilmot met her mother Asmah Abdul Ghani an Acehnese when he volunteered to teach English in Aceh, Indonesia. Her father is an active humanitarian currently working with Muslim Aid.

Married to Ikhwan Johari in September 2002. She has 3 children; Amna Nafeesa, Azra Sareera and Imran Arrazi.

Her work experience ranges from broadcasting, entertainment, journalism, advertising, writing, public speaking, conducting seminars and various social work particularly working with children, women and the underprivileged.

One of the first celebrities in Malaysia to wear the hijab is Wardina. After switching to wearing hijab, Wardina appeared in a Sunsilk advert as one of the first shampoo commercials using a hijab-wearing model. The advert won several awards in the industry and the brand sales rose tremendously. Thereafter, she gained more exposure through additional magazine appearances and media opportunities.

She has found herself caught in between some controversial issues due to her speaking up particularly on her FB posts. She created a stir when questioning a religious leader, the treatment of disabled children and the alleged sexual abuse incident in a religious school owned by a famous preacher

She is seen as an icon and inspiration to many young women. Wardina has been seen to be more silent since moving to Australia keeping her life more private, she has not been sharing posts or pictures nor opinions as often.

=== Education ===
Wardina speaks fluent in English and Malay. She is psychology graduate from Griffith University, Australia. (B.A of Psychological Science). She also holds a diploma in Interior architecture. She is currently pursuing an honours thesis before furthering her studies to attain a Masters in Clinical Psychology.

She completed her primary and high school education in Petaling Jaya, Malaysia.

== Accomplishments & experience ==
- Wardina has more than15 years of experience in the TV/broadcasting industry including hosting live TV talk shows such as "Wanita Hari Ini" and "Malaysia Hari Ini" – a current issues show on Malaysia's leading TV channel.
- Nominated for Pelakon TV Wanita Popular (ABPBH) & Pelakon Filem Wanita Popular (ABPBH) 2002
- Author of "Mama Saya Lapar" (Mum I'm Hungry) focusing on healthy nutrition for children and how to encourage children to eat healthy food and a pictorial children's story book "Siapa Alien"? (Who is the Alien?) a book on how differences should not lead to prejudice
- Mama Saya Lapar is listed as best seller in MPH Bookstore
- She has previously shared her thoughts and ideas as a regular columnist in a parenting magazine “Mami & Baby” and in a teen magazine “Gen-Q”.
- She has also been invited by various TV programs and radio stations to speak, sharing my thoughts and opinions on various topics such as parenting, religion and current affairs. Examples are an interview by ABC during a visit to Australia and an interview on BBC.
- As a popular and influential celebrity, commentator and activist, this led to a very important appointment by the Prime Minister of Malaysia. Wardina was appointed as a member of the National Unity Council, which is tasked to provide recommendations to the Government of Malaysia on how to improve inter-communal and inter-religious relations.
- In 2013, she was also appointed as a Fellow with a government body—the Islamic Da’wah Foundation of Malaysia.
- Wardina was selected by the 'Australian Malaysian Institute' to participate in the inaugural Australia-Malaysia Cultural Exchange program to Australia in 2013 as one of six outstanding young Muslim community leaders.
- Wardina has been the face for countless brands as an ambassador and spokesperson.
- She was the previous President of a Non-Governmental Organization called Muslimah Interest Zone & Networking (MIZAN) which focuses on empowering Muslim women in Malaysia and carrying out charitable activities.

== Public speaking ==
- She has worked and partnered with several universities in Malaysia including the University of Malaya, University Teknologi Malaysia, University Teknologi Petronas, International University Malaysia, Mara Technology University, University Kebangsaan Malaysia, University Tenaga National, Kuala Lumpur infrastructure University, Taylors College Malaysia, University Tenaga Nasional, Cyberjaya University College of Medical Sciences and various other public and private high schools and primary institutions.
- Wardina speaks to students on issues of communication, self-image and self-confidence, love, religion, psychology, media as well as motivation.
- She was invited to speak by the Malaysian Students Association in Southampton United Kingdom and students in Dongyang University South Korea in 2013.
- Wardina was a regular speaker, moderator and emcee for both government and non-governmental institutions.
- Among selected engagements include becoming the ambassador for the National Library of Malaysia and one of the reading icons for Scholastic Malaysia. She has also participated in reading campaign and events such as The Selangor Book Carnival and Malaysia Book Fair.
- She has also accepted invitations by The Ministry of Women and Family Affairs, NAM Institute for the Empowerment of Women (NIEW), Istana Budaya under the Ministry of Information, Communication and Culture Malaysia, The Ministry of International Trade and Industry, Inland Revenue Board of Malaysia, Ministry of Urban Wellbeing, Housing and Local Government and the Prime Ministers Department.
- Wardina helped raise awareness for Postnatal Depression and was invited to speak in the 17th Malaysian Conference on Psychological Medicine on the topic of Media Skills for Mental Health Professionals.
- She was invited as one of the keynote speakers at the Asia Pacific Conference of Early Childhood Education Graduates at the University of Malaya in 2003.
- Various Malaysian student bodies both local and international has invited Wardina to speak in Malaysia, Korea, Aceh, the US, Egypt, Australia and the UK.

== TV appearances ==
Wardina has been doing many TV appearances like hosting Maher Zain Show Case and anchoring Malaysia Hari Ini (2005–2011). Her previous TV hosting are Fitrah Kasih (2009), Ibu Mithali (2008), Menatang Si Manja – RTM (2008), Edu TV – web portal for The Minister of Education (2008), Carta Nasyid Pilihan – TV9 (2008), Sambutan Malidur Rasul peringkat Kebangsaan (TV1), Hits from RIM – VJ, Pencarian Bintang RTM, Seri Laman (TV1), JOm Tukar!, Hijrah Remaja (Astro), Kisah-Kisah Anbia’ (TV3), Ramadhan World Delights 1 & 2, High 5 – JAKIM (TV1)

=== Acting ===
She has since retired from acting completely. Among previous dramas include: IMPIAN (Sunsilk) Musim 2 (2009), Cinta Madinah Musim 1 & 2 (2006), Kalam Cinta Rabiah – TV3 (2007), Impian Illyana Musim 1,2 & 3 (2006–2007), “Children of Adam” VCD, Wardina & Keluarga Pak Tam VCD, Spanar Jaya (a leading sitcom in Malaysia that lasted for 8 seasons), Kepulangan (Astro), Julia – a TV series based on the award-winning novel of the same name (Astro). Her telemovies are Sayangku Puteri – Telemovie (TV1), Maka Diciptakannya Perempuan – Telemovie (NTV 7), Jodoh 2 Beradik – Telemovie (TV3), Berakhirnya Sebuah Ramadhan – Telemovie (TV3) Wardina has appeared in movies, Lagi-Lagi Senario and Cinta 200 Ella
