= Goodbye (Shila Amzah song) =

Single by Shila Amzah

from the album My Journey
- Released: 6 October 2015 (Digital); 1 October 2015 (First live performance)
- Recorded: August–September 2015; Shilala (HK) Limited
- Genre: mandopop
- Length: 3:46
- Label: GME Music; Shilala (HK) Limited
- Songwriters: Kelvin Avon, Jessica Bennett, Groovision
- Producers: Jun Kung, Kelvin Avon

Shila Amzah singles chronology
"See You or Never" (2014)	"Goodbye" (00000001)	"Manusia" (2016)

Music video
- "Goodbye" on YouTube

"Goodbye" is a Mandopop song recorded by Malaysian singer-songwriter Shila Amzah. The song was written by Kelvin Avon and Jessica Bennet and composed by Xiao Guang. The song was produced by Jun Kung and Kelvin Avon. It was released on 6 October 2015, by Shilala (HK) Limited as the lead single from Shila Amzah's debut Chinese-language album (My Journey). The writers were inspired to write "Goodbye" after hearing Shila's previous single which was "See You or Never". The song contains many Malaysian pop and mandopop elements, and its lyrics have Shila desiring an out-of-reach love interest.

== Composition and lyrics ==
At three minutes and forty-six seconds, "Goodbye" is a song which is moderately slow. The single is a continuation from her previous Chinese hit, "Zaijian Bu Zaijian" (再見不再見) — meaning, "See You or Never" — which was inspired from the singer's real love story where she hesitated whether she should leave her boyfriend or not. The latest song provides an answer to the previous song where the singer decided to say "Goodbye" to her painful love and move on. The song was produced by platinum-selling music producer Kelvin Avon along with Hong Kong drummer, singer and songwriter Jun Kung (恭碩良). In an interview with the TVB television show, "Jade Solid Gold" (劲歌金曲), Shila said that the reason she enlisted help from Jun Kung was because she had always wanted to work with a Hong Kong artists and she knows that Kung has a good relationship with the people from her record company, Shilala (HK) Limited.

== Release and promotion ==
The song was first performed during her 2015 Shila Amzah Meet & Greet Hong Kong at Plaza Hollywood, Hong Kong. The song was also an instant commercial success. This song was also nominated as Best Song at the 2015 Peak Music Chart Awards. After launching the song, Shila won numerous awards from China and Hong Kong, proving that the song was popular in China, Hong Kong, and Taiwan.

== Live performance ==
Apart from the debut of the song during the 2015 Shila Amzah Meet & Greet Hong Kong show at Plaza Hollywood, Hong Kong, the song was also performed during the 2015 Shila Amzah Colorful Live in Hong Kong Concert.

== Official music video ==
A sneak peek of the music video for "Goodbye" was released on Shila Amzah's official Instagram account before releasing it on YouTube officially. The music video was eventually released on 4 December 2015 and was directed and produced by Shila herself. She said, "I actually purposely did the music video by my own because when I went through my down times, my best friends were there for me all the time and this video shows how I am relieved that I am finally free and happy and I am grateful that I had my friends and family throughout everything. I finally found myself back and the better version of me". The music video was recorded in Singapore after the 2015 Global Chinese Music Awards.

== Format and track listing ==
Digital download

1. "再見 (國)" – 3:36
