= Siti Nordiana =

Malaysian singer, actress, and songwriter (born 1984)

Siti Nordiana سيتي نورديانا
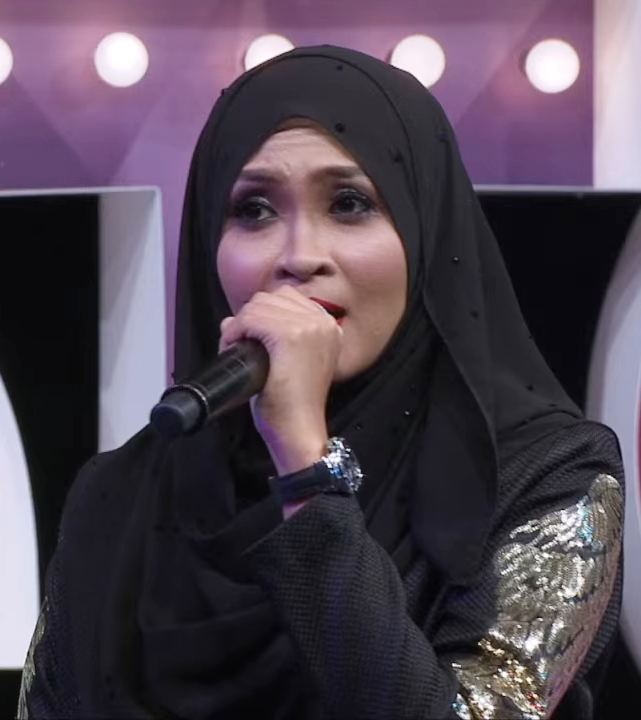
- Siti Nordiana performed on MeleTOP
- Born: Siti Nordiana binti Alias; 22 November 1984 (age 41); Sendayan, Seremban, Negeri Sembilan, Malaysia
- Occupations: Singer; Song Writer; Entrepreneur; Actress
- Years active: 1999–present
- Spouse: Faizal Yusup (m. 2006; div. 2009)
- Children: Mohd Rayyan Nakhaie
- Musical career
- Genres: Pop; R&B; Ballad; Ethnic creative; Traditional Pop
- Instrument: Vocals
- Labels: FMC Music; Trinity Optima Production (Indonesia); Seventeen Eleven Music; Faithful Music; SND Soul Entertainment

Siti Nordiana Alias (born 22 November 1984) is a Malaysian singer, actress, songwriter and businesswoman. She started her music career at age of 15 and has released six studio albums to date. Her name rose again after joining the second season of Gegar Vaganza, winning the competition in 2015.

== Career ==
Siti Nordiana started her music career at her younger age, her father is a responsible person who brought her to music scene. She signed to Malaysian record label, FMC Music and released debut album Gurindam Rindu Berkasih in 1999. Since then, she recorded four more albums until she left FMC Music permanently in 2012. In 2015, she released her first religious album, Anakku Sayang under Sony Music. She was part of the second season of Malaysian reality singing competition, Gegar Vaganza, winning the competition thus reviving her music career. Siti Nordiana also dabbles in acting career, having appeared in a telemovie Helah in 2003. She made a breakthrough role in the television series, Dia Semanis Honey (2016) where she paired with Alif Satar. She then set-up her own company, SND Soul Entertainment which also served as her management team. She wrote her first autobiography, Life Goes On which documented her life and career journey. Released in September 2018 by Mustread Sdn. Bhd., the book was well-received and won the Anugerah Buku Negara 2019 for Best Public Book (Autobiography).

== Personal life ==
Nana was married with actor, Mohd Faizal Yusup on 29 April 2006. They have a son named Muhammad Rayyan Nakhaie who was born on 21 March 2008. However, their marriage did not last long when they divorced on 14 September 2009.

On 1 January 2011, Faizal has died due to a heart attack. Since then, Nana has been more comfortable with her status as a single mother and is fully focused on her only child. According to her, all the strength and enthusiasm to work is for her raising son.

She started wearing a hijab in end year of 2011. In July 2019, she underwent surgery on her eyes to treat short-sightedness.

== Discography ==
=== Studio albums ===
- Gurindam Rindu Berkasih (1999)
- Luahan Hati Kekasih (2000)
- Bingkisan Kasih (2002)
- Pelangi (2004)
- Semakin Jelas (2011)
- Anakku Sayang (2015)
- Hasbi Rabbi (2021)

=== Compilation albums ===
- Firus (2001) - with Syura
- The Best of Siti Nordiana - Rintihan (2002)
- Cahaya Kekasih (2007)

=== Single Release ===
- Cinta Hanya Sandaran (1999)
- Bukan Mengungkit Tapi Membangkit (2000)
- Serikan Wajahmu (2002)
- Biar Seperti Bidadari (Deddy Dores Featuring Siti Nordiana - 2003)
- Jangan Pisahkan (Deddy Dores Featuring Siti Nordiana - 2003)
- Selamanya Cinta (2004)
- Tak Tahan (2011)
- Tak Ada Cinta Sepertimu (2014) with Alif Aziz
- Terus Mencintai (2017)
- Nisan Cinta (2017) with Jaclyn Victor
- Hatiku Milikmu (2018)
- Sebenarnya (2018) with Alif Satar
- Satukan Rasa (2018) with Khai Bahar
- Kesalahan Terindah (2020)
- Angkara (2020)
- Cukup Derita Itu (2021)
- Amaran (2021) with Bunga
- Menyantun Kasih (2022)
- Cintaku Masih Berdiri (2022)
- Arah Cinta (2023)
- Memori Mungkin Berulang (2024) with Tomok
- Gelisah Jiwa Meronta Asmara (2025) with Tomok

== Filmography ==
=== Drama ===
| Year | Title | Role | TV channel |
|---|---|---|---|
| 2010 | Aku Budak Minang 2 | Anor | TV2 |
| 2016 | Dia Semanis Honey | Hani Safira | Astro Ria |
| 2018 | Klik! Pengantin Musim Salju | Kasih Lateefa | Astro Ria |
| 2018 | Cekelat Honey | Maya | Astro Citra |
| 2019 | Satukan Rasa | Indah Suhaila | Astro Ria |
| 2022 | Selamanya Suri Cinta | Wanda Nurhayati | TV9 |
| 2023 | One Million Dollar Voice | Nana | Astro Ria |

=== Telemovie ===
| Year | Title | Role | TV Channel |
|---|---|---|---|
| 2003 | Helah | Nani | VCD |
| 2003 | Prahara | Nana | VCD |
| 2004 | Wad 04 | Fina | VCD |
| 2012 | Anak Tengi | Dira | TV Alhijrah |
| 2017 | Cekelat Semanis Honey | Maya | Astro Citra |
| 2018 | Cekelat Tak Semanis Honey | Maya | Astro Citra |

=== Television ===
| Year | Title | TV channel |
|---|---|---|
| 2017 | Gema Gegar Vaganza (season 1) | Astro Oasis |
| 2018 | Gema Gegar Vaganza (season 2) | Astro Oasis |
| 2018 | Mentor 7 | TV3 |
| 2018 | Bintang Minggu Ini | Astro Ria |
| 2018 | Di Balik Idola | Astro Ria |
| 2021 | All Together Now Malaysia | Astro Ria |
| 2023 | All Stars Gegar Vaganza | Astro Ria |

=== Web Drama ===
| Year | Title | Role | Web |
|---|---|---|---|
| 2022 | AEON: Sayap Bagimu | Kak Siti | YouTube |

== Bibliography ==
- Siti Nordiana (2018). Life Goes On (in Malay). Must Read Sdn. Bhd. ISBN 9789671039106.

== Philanthropy and endorsement ==
On 16 April 2018, Nana and actor, Shaheizy Sam were appointed as ambassadors for Japanese cultured milk products, Calpis to promote the fiber goodness in conjunction with 'Goodness, It's In Our Culture' campaign and to promote the goodness and joy found in all every Calpis drink.

On 19 February 2020, she appointed as an ambassador for the Ze 'Venir brand.

== Awards and nominations ==
| Year | Awards | Category | Result |
|---|---|---|---|
| 2016 | 29th Anugerah Bintang Popular Berita Harian | Popular YouTube Artist | Won |
| 2016 | Anugerah Pilihan Online 2016 | Online Choice Female Singers | Nominated |
| 2016 | Anugerah Pilihan Online 2016 | Dnars Choice Elegant Female | Nominated |
| 2017 | Anugerah Throwbaek | Best Heroin | Nominated |
| 2017 | Anugerah Throwbaek | Best Couple (with Alif Satar) | Nominated |
| 2017 | Anugerah Throwbaek | '0Most Best Scene | Won |
| 2017 | Anugerah MeleTOP Era 2017 | MeleTOP Singer | Won |
| 2017 | Anugerah MeleTOP Era 2017 | MeleTOP TV Actor | Nominated |
| 2017 | 30th Anugerah Bintang Popular Berita Harian | Popular Female Singer | Won |
| 2017 | 30th Anugerah Bintang Popular Berita Harian | Drama Couple (with Alif Satar) | Nominated |
| 2017 | Top Hot 2017 | 2017 Hot Female Singer | Won |
| 2018 | 2018 Era Digital Muzik Awards | Best Interview in Carta Era 40 | Nominated |
| 2018 | Anugerah MeleTOP Era 2018 | MeleTOP Singer | Nominated |
| 2018 | Anugerah MeleTOP Era 2018 | MeleTOP Actor | Nominated |
| 2018 | Anugerah MeleTOP Era 2018 | MeleTOP TV Host | Nominated |
| 2018 | 31st Anugerah Bintang Popular Berita Harian | Popular Female Singer | Nominated |
| 2018 | 31st Anugerah Bintang Popular Berita Harian | Popular TV Host | Nominated |
| 2018 | 31st Anugerah Bintang Popular Berita Harian | Popular Versatile Artist | Nominated |
| 2018 | 31st Anugerah Bintang Popular Berita Harian | Popular Group/Duo Collaboration (with Jaclyn Victor) | Nominated |
| 2018 | Mentor 7 | Finalist | Won |
| 2019 | 33rd Anugerah Juara Lagu | Finalist (with Jaclyn Victor) | Nominated |
| 2019 | Anugerah Buku Negara 2019 | Best Public Book (Autobiography Category) - Life Goes On | Won |
| 2019 | Anugerah MeleTOP Era 2019 | MeleTOP Singer | Nominated |
| 2019 | Anugerah MeleTOP Era 2019 | Hos MeleTOP | Won |
| 2019 | Anugerah MeleTOP Era 2019 | TOP TOP MeleTOP (Wanita) | Won |
| 2019 | 32nd Anugerah Bintang Popular Berita Harian | Popular Female Singer | Won |
| 2019 | 32nd Anugerah Bintang Popular Berita Harian | Popular TV Female Actor | Nominated |
| 2019 | 32nd Anugerah Bintang Popular Berita Harian | Popular Host TV | Won |
| 2019 | 32nd Anugerah Bintang Popular Berita Harian | Popular Versatile Artist | Nominated |
| 2019 | 32nd Anugerah Bintang Popular Berita Harian | Popular Duo/Group Collaboration Artist | Nominated |
| 2019 | 32nd Anugerah Bintang Popular Berita Harian | Most 'Boom' Song | Nominated |
| 2019 | Anugerah Telenovela 2019 | Popular Female Telenovela Actor | Nominated |
| 2020 | 33rd Anugerah Bintang Popular Berita Harian | Artis Kolaborasi/Duo/Berkumpulan Popular | Won |
| 2020 | 33rd Anugerah Bintang Popular Berita Harian | Popular #FANtastik FC | Won |
| 2020 | 33rd Anugerah Bintang Popular Berita Harian | Popular Versatile Artist | Won |
| 2020 | Anugerah MeleTOP Era 2020 | MeleTOP Singer | Nominated |
| 2020 | Anugerah MeleTOP Era 2020 | MeleTOP Versatile Artist | Won |
| 2020 | Anugerah MeleTOP Era 2020 | MeleTOP Group/Dup with Khai Bahar | Won |
| 2020 | Anugerah MeleTOP Era 2020 | MeleTOP Song - "Hatiku Milikmu" | Nominated |
| 2021 | 34th Anugerah Bintang Popular Berita Harian | | |
| 2021 | 34th Anugerah Bintang Popular Berita Harian | Artis Versatile | Won |
| 2021 | 34th Anugerah Bintang Popular Berita Harian | Popular Female Singer | Won |
| 2023 | 35th Anugerah Bintang Popular Berita Harian | Popular Female Singer | Nominated |
