= Let's Talk (talk show) =

Malaysian talk show

- The title card for Let's Talk, the current incarnation of the show
- Genre: Talk show; Variety show
- Created by: KRU Motion Pictures Sdn Bhd
- Directed by: Sherman Xavier
- Presented by: Alvin Anthons (2001-2002)
- Country of origin: Malaysia
- Original language: English
- No. of seasons: 3
- No. of episodes: 38

Production
- Executive producer: KRU Motion Pictures Sdn Bhd
- Running time: 30 minutes
- Production company: KRU Motion Pictures Sdn Bhd

Original release
- Network: Radio Televisyen Malaysia
- Release: 2001 – 2002

Let's Talk is a half-hour English prime time entertainment talk show programme on Radio Televisyen Malaysia TV2 which ran for three seasons. The talk show garnered over one million viewers per episode with Alvin Anthons as its host for all three seasons. During the course of the programme, the show has had local and foreign celebrities, corporate and political figures, interesting professionals and sports personalities. Let's Talk aired every Thursday at 9:30pm on Radio Televisyen Malaysia TV2.

== Production ==
Produced by KRU Motion Pictures Sdn Bhd, 'Let's Talk' is casual and fun, often leaves audiences entertained with either a song and dance, a fun demonstration or a mere impromptu comedy act. The program was recorded in front of live studio audience amidst a set that featured Alvin Anthons as the talk show host and two to three guests per episode.

Topics discussed touches on issues pertaining to lifestyle, human interests, social and current interests. Featured guests included Datin Paduka Marina Mahathir, Anuar Zain, Chef Wan, Sheila Majid, Yasmin Yusoff, Paula Malai Ali.

== Episodes ==
=== Season 1 ===
No.	Original release date	Guest(s)
1	April 5, 2001	Chef Wan & Daniel Ooi
2	April 12, 2001	KRU
3	April 19, 2001	Jalaluddin Hassan & Malik Noor
4	April 26, 2001	Maya Karin & Lina Teoh
5	May 3, 2001	Hishammuddin Hussein & Salleh Yaacob
6	May 10, 2001	Bill Keith & Aida Rahim
7	May 17, 2001	Serbegeth Shebby Singh & Tony the Animal Trainer
8	May 24, 2001	Ferhad & Magnet Man
9	May 31, 2001	Camelia & Helmi Harun
10	June 7, 2001	Zaibo
11	June 14, 2001	Doraemon dubbing crew & Yassin
12	June 21, 2001	Anuar Zain
13	June 28, 2001	Aznil Nawawi

=== Season 2 ===
No.	Original release date	Guest(s)
1	October 11, 2001	Phillipa Yoong
2	October 18, 2001	Najib Ali & Joanna Bessey
3	October 25, 2001	Alleycats (Malaysian rock band) & Wardina Safiyyah
4	November 1, 2001	Harith Iskander & Datin Paduka Marina Mahathir
5	November 8, 2001	Paula Malai Ali & Disney Buzz Azura Zainal
6	November 15, 2001	Mahadzir Lokman
7	November 22, 2001	Michael Jackson Impersonator & Elvis Presley Impersonators
8	November 29, 2001	Sheila Majid & Ras Adiba Radzi
9	December 6, 2001	Dee Jangan Ketawa & Ida Nerina
10	December 13, 2001	Hitz Morning Crew
11	December 20, 2001	Mumtaz Jaafar & Ramly Ali
12	December 27, 2001	Louise & Safari Utan
13	January 3, 2002	Joanne Kam Poh Poh

=== Season 3 ===
No.	Original release date	Guest(s)
1	February 7, 2002	The Royal London Circus
2	February 14, 2002	Elaine Daly & Douglas Lim
3	February 21, 2002	Rashid Salleh & Reefa
4	February 28, 2002	Jeslina Hashim & Khatijah Ibrahim
5	March 7, 2002	Sandra Sothy
6	March 14, 2002	Zahim al-Bakri
7	March 21, 2002	Sarimah Ibrahim & Aki Mustapha
8	March 28, 2002	Min Malik & Ary Malik
9	April 4, 2002	Wan Zaleha Radzi & Innuendo (band)
10	April 11, 2002	Aishah & Leonard Tan
11	April 18, 2002	Gary Ratnam & Nor Suhaimi
12	May 2, 2002	Hans Isaac & Afdlin Shauki
