= MasterChef Selebriti Malaysia =

- Genre: Cooking show Reality TV show
- Judges: Moh Johari Edrus; Zubir Md. Zain; Adu Amran Hassan
- Theme music composer: Hazama ft. Fina
- Opening theme: Impian Rasa
- Country of origin: Malaysia
- Original language: Malay
- No. of seasons: 2
- No. of episodes: 28 (season 1)

Production
- Running time: 60 minutes (including commercials)

Original release
- Network: Astro Ria; Mustika HD
- Release: 25 May 2012 – 26 June 2013

Related
- MasterChef Malaysia

MasterChef Selebriti Malaysia (in English: Celebrity MasterChef Malaysia) is a Malaysian competitive cooking game show. It is the spin-off of MasterChef Malaysia, itself an adaptation of the British show MasterChef, and which features a celebrity contestants casting. Its production began in May 2012 and premiered on Astro Ria and Mustika HD on 25 May 2012.

== Format ==
MasterChef Malaysia has a different format in each episode. A typical episode format is as follows:

1. Saturday - Peti Saji Misteri & Ujian Cipta Rasa. Each participant is given a box containing ingredients to cook the same and need to prepare a meal using ingredients given alone. This dish will be felt by Chef MCM, and a winner will be selected. Peti Saji Misteri winner will be given the opportunity to choose the main course of the Ujian Cipta Rasa. Participants must create a dish using the selected main dish.

2. Sundays - Ujian Sajian Pantas & Penyingkiran. Three participants who are unable to satisfy Chef MCM from the night before the challenge will be a recipe for a particular dish. They need to produce the same dish in the allotted time. Participants who make poor meal would be eliminated from the competition.

3. Monday - Cabaran Sajian Luar. The participants will be divided into teams consisting of the same number and was given the task and time frame to complete this challenge. The task is like cooking for the black tie or military camps. The losing team will face relegation next night.

4. Tuesday - Ujian Sajian Pantas & Penyingkiran. Participants who are unable to satisfy Chef MCM from the night before the challenge will be a recipe for a particular dish. They need to produce the same dish in the allotted time. Participants who make poor meal would be eliminated from the competition.

They will have to overcome pressure tests, creative challenges and elimination tests, under the eye of a very demanding jury, composed of the well-known chefs Moh Johari Edrus (Chef Papa Jo), Zubir Md. Zain (Chef Zubir) and Adu Amran Hassan (Chef Adu).

== Series 1 (2012) ==
=== Contestants ===
Celebrity MasterChef Malaysia Season 1 featured 16 celebrity contestants:

Contestant	Occupation	Status
Fazley Yaakob	Actor and singer	Winner
Angah Iskandarsah	Actor and comedian	Runner-up
Juliza Adzlizan	Singer and vocal coach	3rd Place
Soo Wincci	2008 Miss World Malaysia	Eliminated Semi Final
Farouk Hussain	TV host and actor	Eliminated Semi Final
Azwan Ali	Actor and TV host	Eliminated Week 6
Tomok	Singer	Eliminated Week 6
Jehan Miskin	Actor and model	Eliminated Week 5
Thanuja Ananthan	2009 Miss World Malaysia	Eliminated Week 5
Karl Shafek	TV host	Eliminated Week 4
Raja Azmi	Filmmaker and writer	Eliminated Week 4
Louisa Chong	Actress and comedian	Eliminated Week 3
Serina Redzuawan	Actress	Eliminated Week 3
Siti Sarah	Singer	Eliminated Week 2
Salamiah Hassan	Singer	Eliminated Week 2
Faiz Khaleed	Astronaut	Eliminated Week 1

=== Elimination table ===
Place	Contestant	Episodes																																		
Place	Contestant	1	2		3	4	5		6	7	8	9		10	11	12	13		14	15	16	17		18	19	20	21		22	23	24	25		26	27	28
1	Fazley	WIN	IN	IN	TM	WIN	HIGH	IN	IN	TM	ET	HIGH	LOW	ET	TM	WIN	HIGH	LOW	ET	TM	WIN	WIN	IN	IN	TM	WIN	IN	WIN	IN	TM	ET	IN	LOW	ET	WIN	WINNER
2	Angah	LOW	HIGH	IN	TM	NET	HIGH	IN	IN	TM	WIN	IN	LOW	ET	TM	ET	IN	HIGH	IN	TM	WIN	IN	LOW	ET	TM	WIN	IN	LOW	ET	TM	WIN	HIGH	LOW	ET2	IN	RUNNER-UP
3	Juliza	WIN	HIGH	HIGH	TM	NET	IN	LOW	ET	TM	WIN	HIGH	WIN	IN	TM	ET	HIGH	WIN	IN	TM	WIN	HIGH	WIN	IN	TM	ET	WIN	LOW	ET	TM	WIN	WIN	HIGH	ET	LOW	THIRD
4	Farouk	IN	HIGH	IN	TM	ET	HIGH	IN	IN	TM	WIN	HIGH	IN	IN	TM	WIN	IN	IN	IN	TM	ET	IN	LOW	ET	TM	ET	HIGH	LOW	ET	TM	WIN	HIGH	LOW	SAV	ELI	
4	Soo	WIN	IN	IN	TM	WIN	HIGH	IN	IN	TM	ET2	WIN	IMM	IN	TM	WIN	HIGH	IN	IN	TM	ET	HIGH	IN	IN	TM	ET	HIGH	IN	IN	TM	ET	IN	WIN	IN	ELI	
6	Azwan	LOW	IN	HIGH	TM	ET	IN	IN	IN	TM	WIN	IN	IN	IN	TM	WIN	IN	HIGH	IN	TM	ET	IN	IN	IN	TM	WIN	HIGH	IN	IN	TM	ELI					
7	Tomok	IN	IN	IN	TM	WIN	IN	LOW	ET	TM	ET	HIGH	LOW	ET	TM	ET	HIGH	IN	IN	TM	ET	IN	LOW	ET	TM	WIN	IN	LOW	ELI							
8	Jehan	IN	WIN	IN	TM	WIN	IN	LOW	ET	TM	WIN	IN	IN	IN	TM	WIN	IN	LOW	ET	TM	WIN	HIGH	IN	IN	TM	ELI										
9	Thanuja	IN	IN	IN	TM	NET	WIN	IN	IN	TM	WIN	IN	LOW	ET	TM	WIN	IN	IN	IN	TM	WIN	IN	LOW	ELI												
10	Karl	IN	IN	WIN	TM	WIN	IN	LOW	ET	TM	ET	IN	IN	IN	TM	ET	IN	LOW	ET	TM	ELI															
11	Raja	LOW	HIGH	IN	TM	ET	IN	IN	IN	TM	ET	IN	IN	IN	TM	ET	WIN	LOW	ELI																	
12	Louisa	IN	IN	WIN	TM	NET	IN	IN	IN	TM	WIN	IN	WIN	IN	TM	ELI																				
13	Serina	IN	IN	IN	TM	WIN	IN	LOW	ET	TM	ET	HIGH	LOW	ELI																						
14	Sarah	IN	IN	IN	TM	WIN	HIGH	WIN	IN	TM	ELI																									
15	Salamiah	IN	IN	IN	TM	WIN	IN	LOW	ELI																											
16	Faiz	IN	HIGH	IN	TM	ELI																														

(WINNER) This chef won the competition.
(RUNNER-UP) This chef received second place.
(WIN) The chef won the individual challenge (Mystery Box Challenge or Invention Test) and received an advantage in the next challenge.
(WIN) The chef was on the winning team in the Team Challenge and was safe from the Elimination Test.
(HIGH) The chef was one of the top entries in the individual challenge, but did not win.
(IN) The chef was not selected as a top entry or bottom entry in the challenge.
(TM) The chef was on the blue team in the Team Challenge
(TM) The chef was on the red team in the Team Challenge
(TM) The chef was on the yellow team in the Team Challenge
(TM) The chef was on the green team in the Team Challenge
(IMM) The chef won the Mystery Box Challenge and did not have to compete in the Invention Test.
(ET) The chef was on the losing team in the Team Challenge or the chef was one of the bottom entries in an individual challenge (Invention Test), competed in the Elimination Test, and advanced.
(ET2) The chef competed in second elimination test after first elimination test, and advanced.
(NET) The chef was on the losing team in the Team Challenge, but did not compete in the elimination test, and advanced.
(LOW) The chef was one of the bottom entries in an individual challenge (Invention Test)
(SAV) The chef was Saved from eliminated (Non-elimination Round)
(ELIM) The chef was eliminated from the competition.

== Series 2 (2013) ==
=== Contestants ===
Season 2 featured 19 celebrity contestants:

Contestant	Occupation	Status
Zuraidah "Syura" Badron	Singer	Winner
Celina Khor	TV host	Runner-up
Rozita Che Wan	Actress and model	16th Evicted
Kenchana Dewi	Comedian and actress	15th Evicted
Syanie	Actress	14th Evicted
Michael Ang	Filmmaker	13th Evicted
Enot	Comedian and actress	12th Evicted
Cat Farish	Singer-songwriter	11th Evicted
Lydiawati	Actress	10th Evicted
Sharifah Shahora	Actress	9th Evicted
Radhi Razali	Musician and singer	8th Evicted
Sabhi Saddi	Singer and actor	7th Evicted
Norish Karman	Actress and singer	6th Evicted
Aznil Nawawi	TV host	Quit (Episode 14)
Afiq Muiz	Actor and model	5th Evicted
Sathiya Ramasamy	Comedian	4th Evicted
Zain Saidin	Actor and model	3rd Evicted
Keroz Nazri	Singer	2nd Evicted
Yassin Yahya	Comedian	1st Evicted

=== Elimination chart ===
Place	Contestant	Episodes																																		
Place	Contestant	1	2	3	4	5	6	7	8	9	10	11	12	13	14	15	16	17	18	19	20	21	22	23	24	25	26	27	28	29	30	31	32	33	34	35
1	Syura																																			Winner
2	Celina																																			Runner-up
3	Rozita																																		Eliminated	
4	Kenchana																																Eliminated			
5	Syanie																														Eliminated					
6	Michael																												Eliminated							
7	Enot																										Eliminated									
8	Cat																								Eliminated											
9	Lydiawati																						Eliminated													
10	Sharifah																				Eliminated															
11	Rahdi																		Eliminated																	
12	Sabhi																Eliminated																			
13	Norish														Eliminated																					
14	Aznil														Quit																					
15	Afiq										Eliminated																									
16	Sathiya								Eliminated																											
17	Zain						Eliminated																													
18	Keroz				Eliminated																															
19	Yassin		Eliminated																																	

^Note 1 On episode 4, Syanie, Aznil, Afiq, Che Ta and Keroz willingly to be in the bottom 5 and go through elimination process without being selected by Celina after their team lose.
^Note 2 On episode 8, red team lose and the result of elimination round for performance that week were not revealed and then later it was revealed Saathiya Ramasamy was eliminated.
