= Let's Talk =

Let's Talk may refer to:

- Let's Talk (2002 film), an Indian English-language film
- Let's Talk (2015 film), an Italian comedy-drama
- Let's Talk (talk show), a Malaysian English-language programme
- Let's Talk (album), by 2AM, 2014
- Let's Talk, an EP by Tyler Kyte, or the title song, 2006
- Let's Talk, an EP by Homogenic, 2012
