= Royal London =

Royal London may refer to:

- Royal London Group, the UK's largest mutual life and pensions company
  - Royal London One-Day Cup, a cricket competition sponsored by the above
- Royal London Hospital, a hospital in Whitechapel, London, UK
- Royal London Society for Blind People, a charity based in the UK
- The Royal London Circus, a travelling circus based in Malaysia
