= Azwan Ali =

Azwan Ali may refer to:

- Azwan Ali Rahman (born 1992), Bruneian footballer
- Azwan Ali (actor) (born 1966), Malaysian actor
