= MasterChef Malaysia =

- Genre: Cooking
- Presented by: Mohd Johari Edrus; Zubir Bin Md.Zain; Adu Amran Hassan (Celebrity, Season 2); Yahaya Bin Hassan (Boot-camp Season 1); Priya Menon (Boot-camp season 1); Mohd Nadzri Redzuawan (Season 1)
- Opening theme: Impian Rasa (Hazama & Fina)
- Country of origin: Malaysia
- Original language: Malay
- No. of seasons: 2
- No. of episodes: 66

Original release
- Network: Astro Ria
- Release: 22 October 2011 – 1 December 2012

MasterChef Malaysia is a cooking show based on the international MasterChef format. The show aired its first season on Astro Ria in 2011.

== Season 1 (2011) ==
MasterChef Malaysia Season 1 is officially on 22 October 2011 to 8 January 2012 at 9:00 pm in Astro Ria. The first season introduces the jury of Mohd Johari Edrus (Chef Jo), Zubir Bin Md. Zain (Chef Zubir), and Mohd Nadzri Redzuawan (Chef Riz) while Yahaya Hassan Bin (Chef Yahaya) and Priya Menon (Chef Priya) jointly operate a boot-camp of the screening participants from 40 people to 24 participants MasterChef. Guest chefs including Norman Musa also took part in the series with a Celebrity Challenge.

This season has been crowned Ezani Farhana Md Monoto, a dentist, as the first champion.

=== Top 24 ===
Contestant	Age	States	Occupation	Status
Ezani Farhana	26	Selangor	Dentist	Winner 8 January 2012
Wahidan Ag Supain	42	Sabah	Farmer	Runner-up 8 January 2012
Amita Tan	31	Melaka	Lawyer	Eliminated 4 January 2012
Arshad Zamir	19	Selangor	Student	Eliminated 4 January 2012
Imelda Harris	30	Sarawak	Accessory designer	Eliminated 3 January 2012
Felix Tay	24	Pulau Pinang	Personal trainer	Eliminated 3 January 2012
Ary Malik	40	Kuala Lumpur	Actress	Eliminated 1 January 2012
Brian Chen	25	Selangor	Auditor	Eliminated 28 December 2011
Danial Firdaus	18	Pulau Pinang	Student	Eliminated 25 December 2011
Shahriah Abdullah	37	Johor	Novelist	Eliminated 21 December 2011
Deena Nalisa	26	Kelantan	Project officer	Eliminated 18 December 2011
Azlina Shah	29	Selangor	Freelancer	Eliminated 14 December 2011
Saiful Alip	26	Sabah	Rubber tappers	Eliminated 11 December 2011
Zuraidah Zulfakar	52	Perak	Housewife	Eliminated 11 December 2011
Kamaruzzaman Hasan	45	Selangor	Career counselor	Eliminated 4 December 2011
Zahin Othman	21	Johor	Product designer	Eliminated 30 November 2011
Raymond Clement	28	Selangor	Customer Care	Eliminated 27 November 2011
Nik Michael	21	Selangor	Student	Eliminated 23 November 2011
Mastura Talib	38	Selangor	Housewife	Eliminated 16 November 2011
Terrence Maarat	35	Sabah	Event planner	Eliminated 13 November 2011
Siti Nur Azilah	26	Kuala Lumpur	IT consultant	Eliminated 9 November 2011
Hoe Hui Ting	21	Kuala Lumpur	Graduates	Eliminated 6 November 2011
Zeri Zamri	26	Selangor	Fashion designer	Eliminated 5 November 2011
Azizah Zulkifli	22	Kuala Lumpur	Student	Eliminated 2 November 2011

== Season 2 (2012) ==
Masterchef Malaysia Season 2 is, as of June 2012, in the audition stage and is now on air Every Saturday to Thursday from 7:30–8 PM(Audition episodes between 8 till 13 September 2012) and 9:00 to 10:00 PM starting 15 September 2012(Top 24 Contestants) until 1 December 2012(Final) on Astro Ria.

After Season One, Mohd Nadzri Redzuawan (Chef Riz) did not return and was replaced by Chef Adu Amran Hassan since MasterChef Selebriti Malaysia started. UK-based Chef Norman Musa also made a return to the series for one episode.

This season has crowned Izyan Hani binti Mohd Izham, a geologist, as the winner.

=== Top 24 ===
Contestant	Age	States	Occupation	Status
Izyan Hani	25	Kuala Lumpur	Geologist	Winner
Ah Hong	29	Sarawak	Architect	Runner Up
Fazrul Nizam (Along)	18	Kuala Lumpur	Public administration student	Third Place; Returned in Episode 51; Eliminated in Episode 23
Etiqah "Etiqa" Noorashikeen	24	Sabah	University graduate	Eliminated in Final Episode
Nurul Shazlina (Nina)	31	Kedah	Dealer	Eliminated in Episode 70
Kasilah "Che' Lah" Paeng	40	Johor	Beauty advisor	Eliminated in Episode 69
Nora Ashikin	26	Pahang	Sports officer	Eliminated in Episode 68
Fizuan Syahnaz	19	Johor	Commerce student	Eliminated in Episode 67
Ahmad Nuruddin (Dean)	24	Kedah	Homestay operator	Eliminated in Episode 65
Khairul Ammar	22	Selangor	Aviation student	Eliminated in Episode 62
Wan Nur Eda (Eida)	24	Pulau Pinang	Nursing student	Eliminated in Episode 59
Mohamad Ismail	29	Pulau Pinang	Teacher	Eliminated in Episode 59
Hafiz Bukhari	28	Perak	Steward	Eliminated in Episode 53; Returned in Episode 51; Eliminated in Episode 32
Faizatul Azni	25	Selangor	Financial analyst	Eliminated in Episode 47
Rosemah Ibrahim	49	Negeri Sembilan	Furniture contractor	Eliminated in Episode 44
Mohd Adlyzan (Adly)	28	Pahang	Health officer	Eliminated in Episode 42
Hamdu Joharis	29	Pulau Pinang	VIP driver	Eliminated in Episode 38
Wan Ilaika	23	Selangor	Journalism student	Eliminated in Episode 35
Telson Roy	26	Perak	Waiter	Eliminated in Episode 29
Nur Atiqah	23	Kuala Lumpur	Former stewardess	Eliminated in Episode 26
Noor Zulaikha (Ikha)	21	Pahang	Phone shop assistant	Eliminated in Episode 20
Nur Shahida	28	Sarawak	Doctor	Eliminated in Episode 17
Lokman Nul Hakim (Akem)	19	Selangor	Dealer	Eliminated in Episode 14
Ag Matzleinsah Addy	24	Sabah	Futsal player	Eliminated in Episode 14

=== Peti Saji Misteri: Peluang Kedua ===
For this season, the judges launched a mini comeback competition called 'Cabaran Peti Saji Misteri: Peluang Kedua'. It involves almost all participants who were eliminated in MasterChef Malaysia Season 2. After being eliminated, the contestant continued their journey as eliminee and the contestants in the running and judges would select one of them to return to the competition later. Along returned to the competition in episode 51 for having accumulated of the highest average score for his dish. However, Hafiz were given a second chance to also return to the competition.

Order	Contestant	Result
1	Along	Returned to the competition
2	Hafiz	Returned to the competition
3	Azni	Eliminated in Final Round
4	Ikha	Eliminated in Final Round
5	Rosemah	Eliminated in Final Round
6	Adly	Eliminated in Second Round
7	Joharis	Eliminated in Second Round
8	Ilaikha	Eliminated in Second Round
9	Addy	Eliminated in First Round
10	Akem	Eliminated in First Round
11	Atiqah	Eliminated in First Round

=== Top 10 Finalist ===
Izyan Hani (Izyan) (25 years old) is from Kuala Lumpur. Izyan is a graduate in Geology from a university in Canada. She loves kayaking and has worked on an oil rig prior to joining the competition. Among her favourite dishes are 'mac and cheese with chicken' and 'chicken roulade'. Izyan was announced as the winner on 1 December 2012 after competing with Ah Hong and Along in the season finale.

Ngui Yeang Hong (Ah Hong) (29 years old) is from Sarawak. He was the only Chinese participant in the season. He was a native of Sarawak has lived in Cardiff, United Kingdom for 7 years. This makes Ah Hong able to cook western dishes well. Ah Hong recently resigned as an architect in a firm wanted to further his ambitions in the culinary field. Ah Hong is the most underdog contestant of the season and the underdogness won the judges heart. Ah Hong was announced as the runner up on 1 December 2012.

Muhd Fazrul Nizam (Along) (18 years old) is from Kuala Lumpur. He is a taekwondo player in school and has represented the school at the national level. This young man may be deemed versatility of being able to do variety of jobs such as mechanics and fishing, he is also able to handle a knife properly. Along learned a lot about cooking from his mother and considers his mother as an idol in the culinary field, he wanted to prove that men like him are also able to cook with a nice par with the women out there. He was eliminated on episode 23 and returned to the competition in episode 51 along with Hafiz for having accumulated of the highest average score for his dish. He made it to final and came in third place.

Etiqah Siti Noorashikeen (Etiqa) (24 years old) is from Sabah. She is a post-graduate in Geology from the University Malaysia Sabah and have experience of working on an oil rig for several months before deciding to stop working. Although genius in academic, Etiqa also interested in various other activities such as cooking, karaoke and ATV riding. Her cooking influence is Chef Wan. She survived till final but was eliminated and came in fourth place. On 20 June 2025, she was convicted of the murder of her maid and sentenced to 37 years in prison.

Nurul Shazlina (Nina) (31 years old) is from Kedah. Nina interested in the culinary field since childhood and began making and selling cookies when she was in high school. She is the most quiet, shy and very easy to tears especially when telling stories about her 11-month-old baby. Her cooking influence is her mother. She was eliminated on episode 70, and came in fifth place.

Kasila Paeng (Che' Lah) (40 years old) is from Johor Bahru. The mother of four children, is a contractor and beauty consultant beauty salons conducted in her own house. For Che 'Lah, age is not a barrier to active work and at the same time still look beautiful and elegant. Her personal cooking influence is herself. She is the strongest contender of the season. She was eliminated on episode 69, and came in sixth place.

Nora Ashikin (Nora) (26 years ols) is from Pahang. She is one of the Malaysian Rugby Union players. Nora has also served as an officer in a private college sports. Nora just starting to learn to cook seriously two years ago, through television and the internet. Her cooking influence is from internet . She was eliminated on episode 68, and came in seventh place.

Muhd Fizuan Syahnaz (Fizuan) (19 years old) is from Johor Bahru. He also has a very interesting personality, funny and charming. The most sad thing ever happened in his life was when he had to accept the fact that his mother had died when he was 18 years old. His cooking influence is his mother. Among the specialties are taught by his mother is 'Sambal Bunga Kantan'. He was eliminated on episode 67 and came in eighth place.

Ahmad Nuruddin (Dean) (24 years old) is from Kedah. Passion for cooking since childhood makes him so deeply ingrained in the culinary field. Among his favourite cuisine often gets praise is 'Asam Pedas'. His cooking influence is authentic Malay. He is the first recipient of judges save of the season together with Izyan, saving both from elimination. He was eliminated on episode 65 and came in ninth place.

Khairul Ammar (Ammar) (22 years old) is from Selangor. Among the dishes are always cooked and always get requests from friends and family is, 'Milk Butter Chicken'. His cooking influence is his mother. He was fan's favourite of the season and impressed people after surviving most elimination with injured hand. He was the 16th finalist eliminated on episode 62 and came in tenth place.

== Elimination chart ==
Females	Males	Top 24	Top 10	Winner

Top 3	Safe	Safe First	Safe Last	Eliminated

Stage:		Semi-Finals	Final Week						
Week:		50 Episodes	3/14	3/21	3/28	4/4	4/11	4/18	4/25
Place	Contestant	Result							
1	Izyan Hani	Top 10			Bottom 3				Winner
2	Ngui Yeang Hong	Top 10							Runner Up
3	Muhd Fazrul Nizam	Top 10	Top 3						2nd Runner Up
4	Etiqah Noorashikeen	Top 10	Top 3					Bottom 2	Elim
5	Nurul Shazlina	Top 10		Bottom 3		Bottom 2		Elim	
6	Kasilah Paeng	Top 10	Top 3				Elim		
7	Nora Ashikin	Top 10			Bottom 3	Elim			
8	Fizuan Syahnaz	Top 10	Bottom 2	Bottom 3	Elim				
9	Ahmad Nuruddin	Top 10		Elim					
10	Khairul Ammar	Top 10	Elim						
11–24	Wan Nur Eda	Top 24							
11–24	Mohamad Ismail	Top 24							
11–24	Hafiz Bukhari	Top 24							
11–24	Faizatul Azni Muridan	Top 24							
11–24	Rosemah Ibrahim	Top 24							
11–24	Mohd Adlyzan	Top 24							
11–24	Hamdu Joharis	Top 24							
11–24	Wan Ilaika	Top 24							
11–24	Telson Roy	Top 24							
11–24	Nur Atiqah Anuar	Top 24							
11–24	Noor Zulaikha Abas	Top 24							
11–24	Nur Shahida Wahab	Top 24							
11–24	Lokman Nul Hakim	Top 24							
11–24	Ag Matzleinsah	Top 24							
