= Azwan Ali (actor) =

Malaysian television host and actor

- ازوان علي
- Born: Mohamed Azwan bin Ali; 13 February 1966 (age 60); KK Women’s and Children’s Hospital, Singapore
- Other name: Diva AA
- Occupations: Host Television; Producer; Director; Actor
- Years active: 1988–present
- Parents: Ustaz Ali Omar (father); Hajah Che Tom Yahaya (mother)
- Relatives: Azmin Ali (elder brother); Arpah Ali (youngest brother); Azman Ali (elder brother); Ummi Hafilda Ali (youngest sister); Intan Dawini Ali (elder sister); Norliah Ali (elder sister)

Mohamed Azwan bin Ali (Jawi: محمد ازوان بن علي; born 13 February 1966), also known by his nickname as Diva AA, is a Malaysian television host and actor.

== Early life and career ==
He was born in Kandang Kerbau Hospital, Singapore. He and his entire family were originally Singaporean citizens but his parents eventually chose to become Malaysian citizens after the separation of Singapore and Malaysia in 1965. His family chose to live in Kampung Klang Gate Baru, Gombak, Kuala Lumpur and that is where Azwan Ali grew up. Azwan obtained a Bachelor of Laws degree from the University of Malaya in 1991, and before that also obtained a diploma certificate from Universiti Teknologi MARA. His father Ustaz Haji Ali Omar is from Jurong, Singapore and his mother Hajah Che Tom Yahaya is from Changi, Singapore and now lives in Kampung Klang Gate, Taman Melawati, Ulu Kelang, Selangor, Malaysia.

Azwan Ali once acted in the film Aku No. 1 directed by Datuk Haji Aznil Nawawi and won the 1999 Best Asian Television Award for the "Best Talk Show" category through his program Cit Cat Azwan which aired for 12 years on Astro Ria. Azwan is also a drama and sitcom director and is famous for the telefilms Lontong (1995) and Sambal (1996). He is famous for the phrase See My Level World Class. Apart from that, Azwan Ali is also famous for his pet name AA or Baby AA.

Azwan was born on 13 February 1966 at Kandang Kerbau Hospital, Singapore. His father was a religious teacher and clerk named Haji Ali Omar from Jurong, Singapore (1927–1999) and his mother was a housewife named Hajah Che Tom Yahaya from Changi, Singapore (1935–2017) was a housewife. One of Azwan's older brothers is a prominent Malaysian politician, Dato' Seri Azmin Ali. Azwan later grew up in Kampung Klang Gates, Melawati and attended Setapak High School after his parents chose to become Malaysian citizens. In 1985, Azwan continued his studies in public administration at Universiti Teknologi MARA, Dungun branch, Terengganu. After that, he obtained a degree in law from University of Malaya in 1989.

=== With TV3 (Music, Song Champion Award, Screen Award, Melody) ===
Azwan's career as a television host began when he joined TV3 on 13 March 1988 after undergoing an audition suggested by host Wan Zaleha Radzi. Wan Zaleha noticed Azwan's talent after attending a program with University of Malaya students organized by Azwan. Azwan was assigned as the host of the popular song request program, Sampaikan. His talent was nurtured to become a host at the early age of 22. Azwan had the opportunity to try his talent as an actor when he starred in the television drama titled Naik Tangga Turun Tangga in 1989 and after that the film Harry Boy (1991). Azwan was also invited to duet with singer Wann in the song Nilai Cinta.

In 1989, Azwan took over as the host of the popular weekly entertainment program Muzik Muzik with his partner Charmaine Agustine. Through that show, Azwan made a name for himself and made the program and the annual Anugerah Juara Lagu event to the peak of popularity throughout Malaysia. At TV3, Azwan also served as a producer and was an important person in shaping the content of popular TV shows such as Melodi, Skrin, Teleskop, Mikroskop, In-Person and many more. While with TV3, he pioneered a new style of hosting and became a reference for many new hosts after that. Azwan is known for his efficiency and wisdom in hosting entertainment programs. In 1994, he won the award for Best TV Personality at the first Anugerah Skrin.

After that, Azwan was able to continue his acting talent in the drama Perang Mertua with actress Nor Aliah Lee in 1995. Azwan also directed many comedy dramas with parody elements for TV3 broadcasts. Among the most memorable are the serial drama Sambal (1994–1996) and the raya drama Lontong (1996). Azwan hosted the gossip show Melodi for several years when Seniwati Fauziah Ahmad Daud was assigned as the host. At that time, various innovations were introduced by Azwan to attract many viewers to watch the program. Azwan also hosted the show

forum talk show Teleskop and later rebranded as Mikroskop due to controversy involving statements made by the artists involved. Azwan was with TV3 for 10 years before deciding to leave a permanent career as a TV3 personality in 1997.

In 1997, Azwan starred in the box office film Puteri Impian by playing the character of himself. In the film, the character of a factory girl played by Amy Mastura was depicted as very interested in Azwan and Azwan's television programs.

=== With Astro (Cit Cat Azwan) ===
After leaving TV3, Azwan established Azwan Ali Production. Shortly after, he was approached by Astro, which was still in operation at the time, to produce his own. Azwan started with the program Action! in 1997, but the program was canceled and recommended to be replaced by a talk program hosted by Azwan himself. In July 1998, the Cit Cat Azwan program began airing on the Astro channel. Azwan's casual talk show interviewing local and regional artists received much attention and praise from television viewers. In 1999, Azwan won the Best Talk Show award at the 8th Asian Television Awards in Singapore.

Azwan's Cit Cat show aired for 12 years and was well known for its catchphrase "Amboi, Amboi, Amboi".

Along with that, Azwan also managed to gather dozens of artists every year to celebrate the Cit Cat Azwan Party held at leading resorts nationwide. This program was organized from 1999 to 2007 where many of the artists involved were also given awards at a special awards night. After his contract at Astro was terminated and the end of Cit Cat Azwan's show, he returned to TV3 for the talk show Jangan Tidur Lagi paired with celebrity Adlin Aman Ramli. Azwan's relationship with this program did not last long as it only aired for 2 seasons before being replaced by another host.

=== Became Diva AA ===
After that, Azwan was somewhat fluctuating in his artistic career when he was no longer the main choice of television stations. However, every time he appeared on TV, especially after introducing the characters Baby AA (for the program Propaganza) and Diva AA, he definitely left an impact and became a topic of public conversation until he was known as a Controversial Artist.

In 2013, Azwan participated in the cooking reality program Masterchef Celebrity Malaysia and a year later Masterchef Celebrity All Stars. In 2015, he joined the ranks of young artists in the Running Man-like program, namely Lari, broadcast on TV9. Azwan's appearance in the program was loved by many because of his funny and honest actions. After that, Azwan also appeared in the program Aku Yang Masak Kau Yang Panas broadcast by Astro.

=== Political Scene ===
Since 2016, Azwan has not been active on TV and only appears occasionally either as a guest or as an invited judge. In 2018, Azwan contested the 14th General Election in the Bukit Antarabangsa State Assembly as an independent candidate against his brother, Azmin. Despite losing, Azwan's story went viral in the mass media. Azwan's involvement in the political scene somewhat drowned out his artistic career. In 2019, Azwan then announced that he would move to London, United Kingdom but returned to Malaysia shortly before the implementation of the Malaysian Movement Control Order 2020-21.

==== Results of the Bukit Antarabangsa DUN General Election ====
Selangor State Legislative Assembly
Year	Constituency	Candidate	Votes	Pct	Opponent(s)	Votes	Pct	Ballot Casts	Majority	Turnout
2018	N19 Bukit Antarabangsa	Mohamed Azwan Ali (IND)	90	0.23%	Mohamed Azmin Ali (PKR)	30,892	79.64%	39,057	25,512	84.44%
2018	N19 Bukit Antarabangsa	Mohamed Azwan Ali (IND)	90	0.23%	Salwa Yunus (UMNO)	5,380	13.87%	39,057	25,512	84.44%
2018	N19 Bukit Antarabangsa	Mohamed Azwan Ali (IND)	90	0.23%	Syarifah Haslizah Syed Ariffin (PAS)	2,311	5.96%	39,057	25,512	84.44%
2018	N19 Bukit Antarabangsa	Mohamed Azwan Ali (IND)	90	0.23%	Ahmad Kamarudin (PRM)	116	0.30%	39,057	25,512	84.44%

=== Comeback 2020 ===
After several years of isolation and involvement in the national political scene, Azwan returned to TV3 through the second season of the program Lagu Cinta Kita together with Elly Mazlein. This program received widespread praise and was watched by over 3 million viewers each week, while also reviving the name of Azwan, who was missed by viewers.

== Filmography ==
=== Television Shows / Streams ===
Year	Show	Concept	Total seasons	Notes	Channel
1988–1994	Sampaikan Raya	Song Request	14 seasons (280 episodes, two seasons per year)	Host / Video Jockey	TV3
1989–1996	Muzik-Muzik; Anugerah Juara Lagu	Charts & Talk Shows	8 seasons 364 episodes	1989-1990 - Co-host with Charmaine Agustine, the rest solo 1996 - only hosted the Semi-Finals stage as co-producer from 1994 -1996	TV3
1991	Meriah Selera	Cooking Program	1 season		TV3
1992–1993	Dunia Lelaki	Magazine Program	2 seasons		TV3
1992	Tiru Macam Saya	Candawara	1 season	also as a scriptwriter	TV3
1994–1996	Melodi	Entertainment News	3 seasons	also as a screenwriter	TV3
1994–1997	Skrin	Movie Talk	4 seasons	also as screenwriter The Host with Emma Hussin	TV3
1994–1995	Teleskop	Forum	1 season	also as a screenwriter	TV3
1995–1997	Mikroskop Azwan Ali	Forum	2 seasons	also as a screenwriter The second season is hosted by Tiara Jacquelina	TV3
1995–1996	Anugerah Skrin	Film/TV Awards Ceremony	Special Program	also as a scriptwriter	TV3
1997	Bersama di Hari Raya	TV Entertainment	Special program	Also performed singing	TV3
1997	Action!	Infotainment	1 season		Astro Ria
1998	Temasya Aidilfitri	TV Entertainment	Special program	assisted by Mr. Os	TV1
1998–2009	Cit Cat Azwan; Parti Cit Cat Azwan	Talk Show	12 seasons (299 episodes, including Cit Cat Raya)	also as a scriptwriter, editor Guest hosts include Sheila Rusly, Sharifah Shahora, Saiful Apek, Dina Nadzir, Johan	Astro Ria
1998	Malaysia Boleh!	TV Entertainment	1998 Commonwealth Games special program		TV2
1998–1999	Satu	TV Entertainment	1 season	also as a scriptwriter	TV1
2000	KLCC 2020 Millennium Night	TV Entertainment	New Year 2000 special program	Co-host Linda Onn	Astro Ria
2000–2002, 2008–2009	Cak Cak	TV Entertainment	4 seasons	also as a screenwriter	Astro Ria
2004–2005	Hits 1	Song Charts	2 seasons	second season with Annahita Bakavoli	TV1
2004–2007	Rentak Juara Rhythm of the Champion	Band Music Competition (Reality)	4 seasons	with Saiful (KLFM)	TV2
2007–2008	Jangan Tidur lagi	Talk Show / TV Entertainment	2 seasons	Host with Adlin Aman Ramlie	TV3
2009	Amboi...Amboi...Amboi	TV Entertainment	1 season	also as a scriptwriter	Astro Prima
2010–2011	Tiada Lama Tiada Baharu	TV Entertainment / Candawara	1 season	also as a scriptwriter Co-host Didie Alias	TV1
2011–2013	Propaganza	Entertainment News	2 seasons	Katanya Baby AA Segment Host	Astro Ria
2013–2014	Untuk Dia	Entertainment TV / Musical	1 season	also as a scriptwriter	TV2
2014	Ketupat Rendang Boom	Entertainment TV / Musical	Special programs	also as a scriptwriter	TV2
2020	Lagu Cinta Kita (Season 2)	Singing Competition (Reality) / Talk	1 season	Co-host Elly Mazlein	TV3
2021–2022	Laser Bertemu Laser Diva AA	Talk Show	2 seasons		Astro Ria / Astro Gempak
2021	MyResepi	Cooking Program	1 season	as a celebrity chef	Oh! Bulan / TV3
2021	Kasi Settle Itu Lirik	Candawara	1 season	J	Awesome TV
2022	Mic ON! (Season 2)	Singing Competition (Reality)	1 season	Co-host with Issey Fazlisham	Awesome TV

=== Awards ceremony (as host) ===
Year	Event	Type	Channel
1989	Anugerah Juara Lagu Ke-4	Live Broadcast	TV3
1990	Anugerah Juara Lagu Ke-5	Live Broadcast	TV3
1991	Anugerah Juara Lagu Ke-6	Live Broadcast	TV3
1992	Anugerah Juara Lagu Ke-7	Live Broadcast	TV3
1993	Anugerah Juara Lagu Ke-8	Live Broadcast	TV3
1994	Anugerah Juara Lagu Ke-9	Live Broadcast	TV3
1995	Anugerah Skrin 1995	Live Broadcast	TV3
1995	Anugerah Juara Lagu Ke-10	Live Broadcast	TV3
1996	Anugerah Pilihan Pembaca Media Hiburan 1996	Recording	Entertainment Media
1999	Cit Cat Azwan (season 1)	Recording	Astro Ria
2000	Cit Cat Azwan (season 2)	Recording	Astro Ria
2001	Cit Cat Azwan (season 3)	Recording	Astro Ria
2002	Cit Cat Azwan (season 4)	Recording	Astro Ria
2004	Cit Cat Azwan (season 5)	Recording	Astro Ria
2004	Pencarian Hero Remaja 2004	Recording	Karangkraf/Astro Ria
2005	Hits 1 Final (2004)	Live Broadcast	TV1
2005	Anugerah Skrin 2005	Live Broadcast	TV3
2005	Hits 1 Final (2005)	Live Broadcast	TV1
2005	Cit Cat Azwan (season 6)	Recording	Astro Ria
2007	Cit Cat Azwan (season 7)	Recording	Astro Ria

=== Movies ===
Year	Title	Character	Notes
1991	Harry Boy	Wan	First film
1993	Hanny	Aziz	
1993	Kekasih Awal Dan Akhir	TV Host	Special appearance
1997	Puteri Impian	Himself	Special appearance
2004	Aku No.1	Azwan	
2004	Pontianak Harum Sundal Malam	Tengku Mahkota Sultan	Special appearance
2006	Diva Popular	Himself	Special appearance
2008	Tipu Kanan Tipu Kiri	Shaarif M	
2008	Cicakman 2 - Planet Hitam	Jiran 1	Special appearance
2009	Sifu & Tongga	Mak Nyah ATM	Special appearance
2009	Setem	Restaurant Manager	Special appearance
2012	Hantu Air	Diva Azwan Ali	
2012	Shh...Dia Datang	Perogol	Unreleased

=== Telefilm ===
Year	Title	Credited as			Character	Channel
Year	Title	Actor	Director	Producer	Character	Channel
1993	Perang Mertua	Yes	No	No	Azmi	TV3
1995	Lontong	No	Yes	Yes	also as a scriptwriter	TV3
1998	Serunding	Yes	Yes	Yes	also as a scriptwriter	Astro Ria
1998	Nasi Himpit	Yes	Yes	Yes	also as a scriptwriter	RTM
2001	Raya Rantau	Yes	Yes	No	also as a scriptwriter	TV2
2002	New Boyz The Movie	No	Yes	No		VCD (Suwah); Banned for release
2002	Pulau Inspirasi	No	Yes	No		VCD (Suwah)
2004	Cinta Apa Di Pagi Raya ?	Yes	Yes	No	Tok Kadi, also as a scriptwriter	TV2
2005	Lodeh	Yes	Yes	Yes	also as a scriptwriter	RTM
2006	Lagi-lagi Raya	No	Yes	No	also as a scriptwriter	TV1
2012	Lemang Nan Sebatang	Yes	Yes	Yes	also as a scriptwriter	TV1
2021	Dolla Watch Me Glow	Yes	No	No	Kelly	Astro Citra

=== Drama ===
Year	Title	Credited as			Character	Channel
Year	Title	Actor	Director	Publisher	Character	Channel
1989	Naik Tangga Turun Tangga	Yes	No	No	Interest	TV3
1995–1996	Sambal	No	Yes	Yes	also as a screenwriter	TV3
2021	Diva Popular	Yes	No	No	mr. Director	Awesome TV
2021	Madam E-Wallet	Yes	No	No	Himself	TV3 /Very Drama
2021	Anak Sena	Yes	No	No	Abu Seman	TV3 /Very Drama
2021	Shah Alam 40000	Yes	No	No	Diva AA	TV3 /Very Drama
2021	Kekasih Hati Mr. Bodyguards	Yes	No	No	Mahfouz	TV3 /Very Drama
2022	Scammer 2	Yes	No	No	Hanif	Astro Ria

=== As a reality TV contestant ===
Year	Title	Channels
2013	MasterChef Salebriti Malaysia	Astro Ria
2013	Sesat	Astro Ria
2014	MasterChef Selebriti All Stars	Astro Ria
2014	Tua Pun Boleh	Astro Ria
2015	Lari: Mr X	TV9
2015	Aku Yang Masak Kau Yang Panas	Astro Ria

=== Radio & Siniar ===
Year	Title	Siniar Channels/Applications
2012–2013	Diva Vazz with DJ Adik	KL Pop Radio (1MalaysiaTV)
2017	Why Bother? by Diva AA (24 ep)	Ais Kacang Podcast (Prima Media)
2018	Table Talk : Azwan Ali	Linda Onn Table Talk
2019	Begitu Begini DJ Naz	THR Gegar FM
2020	OK Let's Go Azwan Ali Part 1,2, and 3	Siniar Ok Lets Go (Singapore)
2022	Borak Sini Habis Sini	Siniar Budiey Channel
2023	Bros Gang TV: Azwan Ali	Bros Gang TV
2024	Borak Selabriti with Dina Nazir and Faliq Hykal	Sinar FM

=== Television Appearance / Stream ===
Year	Title	Role	Channel	Notes
1997	Bersama Hari Raya	Host, Singer	TV3	
2003	Akademi Fantasia 1	Invited Critic (Concert 6)	Astro Ria	
2004	Akademi Fantasia 2	Special Appearance (Concert 8)	Astro Ria	
2012	Primadona	Invited Guest	Astro Prima	
2013	MeleTOP	Invited Guest	Astro Ria	
2013	Betul ke Bohong? (Season 4)	Guest Artist	Astro Warna	Episode 2
2013	Betul ke Bohong? (Season 5)	Guest Artist	Astro Warna	Episode 1
2014	Ketuk-ketuk Ramadan	Invited Guest	TV1	
2014	Sembang Teh Tarik AC Mizal	Invited Guest	Astro Warna	
2017	Apa Itu Cinta bersama DJ Lin	Invited Guest	Suria FM	
2018	Ceritera Angan-angan Azwan Ali	Invited Guest	YT - mStar Online	
2018	Motif Viral	Invited Guest	Astro Ria	
2019	Arena Panggang	Invited Guest	Astro Warna	
2019	Siapa Azmin Ali?	Invited Guest	YT - Malaya Post	
2020	MH Throwback	Invited Guest	YT - Media Hiburan	
2020	Begitu Begini DJ Naz	Invited Guest	YT - Gegar	
2020	Azwan Ali Melahar Dibilique	Invited Guest	DBilique TV	
2020	Sepahtu Reunion Live	Cameo / Special Appearance	Astro Warna	
2020	Wanita Hari Ini	Forum Panel: From Career to Interest?	TV3	
2020	Nyanyi Lirik Itu	Invited Guest	YT - Oh! Moon / Seismic	
2020	Q&A Diva AA	Invited Guest	YT - Rosix & Bella	
2020	MeleTOP	Invited Guest	Astro Ria	
2020	Kopi O Bersama Rashid Sibir	Invited Guest	YT - Opera Klasik	
2021	Warung Sepahtu	Invited Guest	Astro Warna	
2021	Maharaja Lawak Musical	Invitational Participants - ABC Group	Astro Warna	
2021	Eksklusif Sumber Diva AA	Invitational Guests	YT - Sumberkini	
2021	Gelak Gempak Raya	Stand Up Comedy	Astro Warna	
2021	Pung Pang Rizalman	Invitational Guests	Astro Ria	
2021	Luahan Selebriti	Invitational Guests	Astro Ria	
2021	Nostalgia Rasa Ramadan	Invitational Guests	Astro Ria	
2021	PHD Muzik Raya	Quiz Show	Astro Ria	
2021	The Story of...	Invited Guest	Sinarplus	
2021	Betul Ke Bohong Kuasa 2	Team Captain	Astro Warna	Episode 1&4

=== Advertisement ===
Year	Title	Character	For	Pairing
2025	Rahsia Tuhan		Proton & Little Joe	Que Haidar

== Discography ==
=== Recording ===
==== Single/Vocal ====
Year	Song title	Chart Top Position			Album	Labels
Year	Song title	Era	Muzik.fm	Muzik-Muzik	Album	Labels
1992	"Nilai Cintamu" duet with Wann Rashyidah	—	—	—	Nostalgia Koleksi: Versi Duet	SCS
1993	"Dari Jauh Ku Pohon Maaf"	—	—	—	Hari Raya Seribu Bintang	Suwah (Suria Records)

==== Song Creation/Ideas ====
Year	Song	Artist	Labels	Note
2010	Apa Kau Kisah?	One Nation Emcees	Monkey Bone (EMI)	
2017	Amboi	Altimet	Kartel Records (Sony Music)	Special appearance
2019	Ha Tepok!	Kid Santhe	Sony Music	
2020	See My Level	Ashraf Nasser	Independent	
2022	Kajima	Meer Nash	Universal Music	Special appearance

=== Music Videos ===
==== Appearance In Music Videos ====
Year	Song	Artist	Labels	Note
2017	Amboi	Altimet	Kartel Records (Sony Music)	Graphically
2023	Faham Tak?	Alyssa Dezek	XENO Entertainment	
2025	Lagu Lelaki Gila	Naim Daniel	XO House	

==== Music Video Direction ====
Year	Song	Artist
1989	Cintaku Hanyut Di Lautan Sepi	Ramlah Ram
1990	Bercanda Di Pasiran Pantai	Anita Sarawak & Sudirman Arshad
1990	"Salam Aidilfitri"	Jamal Abdillah
1997	Aidilfitri Nostalgia	Sharifah Aini
1999	Kesuma Hati	Ziana Zain
2000	Kembalilah Sayang	Dayang Nurfaizah
2001	Seandinya Masih Ada Cinta (Malaysia Version)	Dayang Nurfaizah
2002	Bisikan Hati	Siti Nurhaliza

== Awards and nominations ==
Year	Nomination	Category	Ceremony	Results
1992	Azwan Ali ("Harry Boy")	Popular Male Supporting Actor	6th Popular Stars Awards	Nominated
1994	Azwan Ali	Favorite TV Personality	TV3 Screen Awards	Won
1995	"Teleskop"	Best TV Entertainment Program Production	TV3 Screen Awards	Won
1995	"Sampaikan Aidilfitri"	Best TV Entertainment Program Production	TV3 Screen Awards	Nominated
1996	"Muzik-Muzik 10"	Best TV Entertainment Program Production	TV3 Screen Awards	Nominated
1999	"Cit Cat Azwan"	Best Talk Show (Entertainment)	Asian Television Awards	Won
2000	"Cit Cat Azwan"	Best TV Entertainment	Asian Television Awards	Nominated
2004	"Cit Cat Azwan" / "Hits 1"	Popular Male TV Host	Berita Harian Popular Star Awards	Nominated
2005	"Cit Cat Azwan" / "Hits 1"	Popular Male TV Host	Berita Harian Popular Star Awards	Nominated
2007	"Cit Cat Azwan"	Popular Male TV Host	Berita Harian Popular Star Awards	Nominated
2010	Himself	Most Sensational Artist (Male)	2009 Entertainment Media Readers' Choice Sensational Award	Won
2010	"Jangan Tidur Lagi"	Best Talk	TV3 Screen Awards	Nominated
2018	"Amboi" - Altimet/ D. Navigator	Finalist (Azwan as uncredited composer)	32nd Song Winner Award	Nominated
2021	Himself	Achievement in Television	ASEAN Inspiring Awards	Won

== Pop culture ==
Azwan Ali was one of the earliest television hosts to be promoted as TV personalities. This is because of his popularity across various races and his consistent appearance on television for entertainment and comedy programs.

=== Taglines ===
Throughout his celebrity status, Azwan used many taglines and quotes which later became popular with the general public.

Taglines / Quotes	Origin	Notes
"Tungguu"	Background Melody	Included in the dialogue of the film "Puteri Impian"
"Salam Siaran"	First introduced through the program Sampaikan	Also popularized by host Christine Ling
"Dek Non"	Title for fellow artists	Adapted to "Bang Non" to call Dato' Seri Anwar Ibrahim since 2011)
"Ha! Tepuk!" or "Tepuklah Sikit"	Used when hosting Muzik Muzik and Anugerah Juara Lagu	Later popularized by comedian Sharifah Sakinah (2017) and adapted as a song with the same title by Meerfly and Kid Santhe (2019). "Tepuklah Sikit" was also popularized by host Viviana Abdullah.
"Amboi Amboi Amboi"	Used when hosting Cit Cat Azwan	Later adapted into a song called Amboi by rapper Altimet
"Kau Rasa?"	Used in the Cit Cat program.	Styled as "Ko Gha-ser?"
"Kau Ada?"	Used in the Cak Cak program	Once inspired by the title of the comedy film Aku Ada, Kau Ada??? starring Kamal Adli and Shaheizy Sam
"Kau Mampu?"	Used in the Cak Cak program	
"Ada Aku Kisah?"	Occurred while answering a journalist's hot question	Later adapted into a song titled Apa Ku Kisah by the group One Nation Emcees
"Why Bother? Why Bother? Why Bother?"	Used on social media sites (Twitter)	Later immortalized as a podcast program "Why Bother?" on the Ais Kacang application
"See my level"	Used on social media sites (Twitter/ Instagram)	Several times featured in comedy programs by local comedians; branded on oil products.
"(Money) Berkepuk-kepuk! Berkepuk-kepuk"	Used on social media sites (Twitter/ Instagram)	Obtained in the dialogue of the drama "Diva Popular"
"Sempudal"	Used on social media sites (Twitter/ Instagram)	Meaning 'dirty mouth'
"Mulut-mulut Hanswang"	Used on social media sites (Twitter/ Instagram)	Derived from 'hanjeng' or dog; refers to a cheat
"Nerakazen"	Used on social media sites (Twitter/ Instagram)	Referring to netizens/haters who insulted him on social media
"World class only!"	Used on social media sites (Twitter/ Instagram)	Added to the slogan "See My Level"
"Malayu Mulia Syurga"	Used on social media sites (Twitter/ Instagram)	Referring to his loyal fans
"2 X 5, 5 X Babi!"	Used on social media sites (Twitter/ Instagram)	Went viral during his 'special message' in conjunction with the Malaysian Movement Control Order 2020-21
"Tersedap di muak bumi"	Used on social media sites (Twitter/ Instagram)	Used to promote the Rendang Chef Diva / Rendang Mak Tom business
"Mokluu"	Used on social media sites (Twitter/ Instagram)	
"Sangkak"	Used on social media sites (Twitter/ Instagram)	Means someone of low status.
"Kau Sekolah Tak? Kau SPM Lepas Tak?"	Used on social media sites (Twitter/ Instagram)	Aimed at haters. SPM stands for "Sijil Rendah Pelajaran", a public examination for lower secondary level.
"Haus Di Aidilfitri"	Introduced on Azwan's show Cit Cat	Aimed at a situation or something that is sad, less interesting

When the Movement Control Order began on 18 March 2020, Azwan used his social media to raise awareness among the public to stay at home. A video warning the public via his Instagram page then went viral and was followed by netizens.

=== Alter ego ===
Azwan is also known for his unique character in the entertainment world. Since 2011, he has branded himself with the character Baby AA, a pink-haired street gossip who uses a loudspeaker for the show Propaganza. However, this character has been criticized by many.

After that, she named herself Diva AA in 2014, often carrying a monopod to take selfies with fans with the hashtag #SelfieWithDivaAA. However, Azwan's original image as Azwan Ali was positively received and welcomed by netizens.

=== Parody ===
Throughout his career as a celebrity, Azwan's personality has been used as a joke in local entertainment programs and films several times. Here are some parodies involving his character, not including dramas/films featuring Azwan as himself.

Year	Drama	Actor	Note
2011	Mak Aku Artis	Zizan Nin	Zizan plays the role of an entertainment journalist similar to Azwan
2012	Maharaja Lawak Mega 2012	Johan	Johan plays the role of "Baby AA", a reporter for Propaganza (referred to as Propaganjil)
2013	MeleTOP	Jihan Muse	Jihan plays the role of "Diva AA", a contestant on Celebrity Masterchef
2021	MeleTOP	Daniel Zaini	Danial parodies the special PKP message action by Diva AA
2022	Laugh 90 Seconds	Diva BB Potted Chicken	TikToker from Penang parodied the action of Diva AA as the character of Diva BB
2023	Family Duo 4	Danial Zaini	Danial parodied the action of "Diva AA" with the name "Diva ABC" in the final performance of Syarif and Syaiful Zero
2024	Muzikal Lawak Superstar (season 4)	Diva BB Potted Chicken	Diva BB once again parodied Diva AA with the verse "KL-Semenyih" when participating in the performance of the Sarkas group.

=== Common collaborations ===
Azwan Ali is known as a celebrity who has worked with almost all the artists who were active in the 1990s and 2000s through his programs. There are several celebrities who have frequently collaborated with him throughout his involvement since 1988.

Artist	Deliver (1988–1994)	Muzik Muzik Lagu Champion Award (1989–1996)	Melodi (1994–1996)	Lontong (1995)	Sambal (1996)	Cit Cat Azwan (1998–2009)	Cak Cak (2000–02;2008–09)	I am No. 1 (2004)	MasterChef Malaysia (2012–2014)	Lagu Cinta Kita (2020–2021)
Norlia Ghani				X mark	X mark	X mark	X mark			
Charmaine Augustine	X mark	X mark								
Aznil Nawawi	X mark	X mark	X mark		X mark	X mark		X mark		
Farouk Hussain			X mark	X mark	X mark	X mark	X mark	X mark		
Ogy Ahmad Daud	X mark	X mark	X mark	X mark						
Chef Wan	X mark					X mark				
Sheila Rusly						X mark	X mark			
Shamsul Ghau Ghau			X mark	X mark	X mark	X mark	X mark			
Sharifah Shahora						X mark	X mark		X mark	
Salih Yaacob		X mark	X mark	X mark	X mark	X mark		X mark		
Jaafar Onn					X mark	X mark	X mark	X mark		
Mas Idayu						X mark				X mark
Louisa Chong					X mark	X mark	X mark			
Rosnah Mat Aris				X mark	X mark	X mark	X mark	X mark		
Syanie Hisham				X mark	X mark	X mark			X mark	
Elly Mazlein						X mark				X mark

== Issue ==
=== 1990s ===
At the beginning of Azwan's appearance, he was not a controversial artist, although his status at that time was the most popular television host since the legendary host Taufik Latif. The first gossip involving Azwan was about his relationship with the beautiful singer Fauziah Latiff, which the singer revealed that they were just friends in 1991. In 1992, Utusan Melayu journalist Saodah Ismail wrote her comments on Azwan's character which was described as "Syok Sendiri", "Over", and "Gila Glamor". Azwan was also heavily criticized by the audience when he jokingly made the statement "Malayu belacan" in the Muzik Muzik program in 1994, while Azwan was once accused of being bouncy when it was said that he would leave the Muzik Muzik and Mikroskop programs.

In 1995, singer Ziana Zain once issued a statement on Media Hiburan that read "Azwan Ali is not my taste" meaning Azwan was not the man she dreamed of. This statement hurt Azwan's heart after he tried several times to woo the famous singer. After that, Azwan refused to be associated with the outspoken singer. One of Azwan's talk shows, "Teleskop", once shocked the country when guest artists who gave opinions were seen as too open and did not take into account the sensitivities of the audience, eventually this program was canceled due to public outcry.

Azwan revealed that one of the reasons he resigned as a host and producer at TV3 was because of his decision to let Siti Nurhaliza (a new artist at the time) compete in the Semi-Final of Muzik Muzik 11 stage even though the singer was unable to attend the training and rehearsal stage due to her SPM examination. Azwan revealed that he gave 24 hours' notice after the end of the 11th Song Award by the new year 1997 after serving for 10 years at the number 1 station at the time. After leaving TV3, Azwan did not look back and continued to launch Azwan Ali Productions. Azwan also had a meeting with the Minister of Information Datuk Mohamed Rahmat after leaving the private station.

During the Reformasi (Malaysia) in 1997–1998, Azwan was seen accompanying his sister Ummi Hafilda Ali who was involved as the main witness in the case of alleged abuse of power by former Deputy Prime Minister Anwar Ibrahim. The Cit Cat Azwan show began airing in 1998, at which time famous singer Ziana Zain had just gotten married. Azwan Ali, who was once linked to Ziana, has filed a defamation suit against the producer of the show Melodi, Michael Christian Simon, along with the TV3 station and the pair of hosts, Fauziah Ahmad Daud and Saiful Apek, for citing his name as "slanderous because Ziana got married". The suit was dismissed by the court, and on 25 October 2000, the Kuala Lumpur High Court ordered Azwan to pay costs of RM29,156.20 to Fauziah Ahmad Daud and RM49,650.00 to TV3 in relation to his failure in the suit for defamation.

=== 2000s ===
Azwan's sister, Ummi Hafilda, once filed a lawsuit against the tabloid newspaper Bacaria for allegedly defaming Ummi and Khairuddin Abu Hassan as being married, thus affecting her chances of getting married. The publication claimed that they got information from internet channels and Azwan himself. In 2000, Chef Wan caused controversy when he dressed like a woman while hosting the Cit Cat Azwan 2000 Party in Johor Bahru, while famous producer Julie Dahlan, once shocked the press when his appearance in Cit Cat Azwan was described as being too open when talking about personal questions. Following the dispute between Azwan and several celebrities, the host was nicknamed Kaki Gaduh. Among the artists who had a bad relationship with Azwan at that time were Jaafar Onn, Aznil Nawawi, and Chef Wan. In 2004, Azwan filed a police report to ensure Aznil Nawawi stopped interfering with his personal affairs.

In 2002, the telefilm New Boyz The Movie directed by Azwan was banned by the Film Censorship Board (LPF) which did not allow the appearance of female characters played by men. In the comedy telefilm, the character of a female student named Siti Payung was played by Farouk Hussain. Because Siti Payung is one of the important supporting characters, the producer's attempt to re-edit the telefilm by removing the character of Siti Payung failed and caused the New Boyz The Telemovie VCD to not be marketed. When hosting the final stage of the Rentak Juara competition in 2004, Azwan once mistakenly announced the winner's decision until the issue exploded in the mass media even though Azwan corrected the situation during the live broadcast and apologized.

Cit Cat Azwan was broadcast exclusively in 2006 during the live broadcast of singer Siti Nurhaliza's wedding. The episode titled "Cit Cat Diana Kulai! Diana Mawilah!" was broadcast in two episodes and aired simultaneously with Siti's wedding as a strategy for a ratings war between Astro/RTM and TV3 stations. After the special Cit Cat program, Astro and RTM also aired the program "Mawi...Ina" hosted by Rosyam Nor. Continuing from the Mawi issue, the popular singer also caused controversy when he turned down an invitation to appear on Azwan's Cit Cat program. According to Mawi, he had a tight schedule and was also afraid of the concept of the talk show.

The organization of Mesra Sokmo Cit Cat Azwan 2007 became the peak of controversy when Azwan claimed to be unaware of the plan to sell tables on the night of the Mesra Sokmo PCC7 Gala which had been made by the event management company and the Terengganu state government without the knowledge of Azwan Ali Productions and the artists involved in the performance. This caused several artists such as M. Nasir, Adibah Noor, Ning Baizura and Hattan to not want to perform because they felt used. Unlike the previous PCC which was entirely managed by Azwan Productions, MSCCA 2007 was jointly organised by the state government and the appointed event management company, which caused the tentative programme to be in chaos and left many artists and media friends dissatisfied, and the state government and Azwan even clashed with each other in statements to the press. Not only that, the name of this program needs to be changed from 'Parti' to 'Mesra' because the word party is considered not suitable for the state of Terengganu. The issue at MSCCA 2007 caused Azwan's relationship with several media outlets to become murky, to the point that he was banned for several years.

The controversy between Azwan and dangdut singer Ifa Raziah has never subsided since they were friends for so long. The most controversial episode was when Ifa described Azwan as forgetful while in Genting Highlands to attend the 2007 Berita Harian Popular Star Awards, as a result Ifa announced that she had broken up with the host. Azwan's car was stolen in 2008. In 2009, Azwan's official blog was said to have received a warning from the Malaysian Communications and Multimedia Commission due to its digital content containing excessive gossip.

=== 2010s ===
After hosting the comedy program "Tiada Lama Tiada Baharu" with comedian Didie Alias since 2010, Azwan was dropped from hosting the second season after it was alleged that the drop was made by certain parties. Shortly after, Azwan criticized Didie and Enot's hosting style by describing the two comedians' actions in hosting the comedy program as chimpanzees. As a result, Azwan and Didie exchanged statements on Twitter until they finally reconciled in 2017.

Azwan had once made death threats against his sister Ummie Hafilda via Twitter. On 13 January 2012, Ummi filed a police report at the Taman Tun Dr Ismail Police Station. Petaling Jaya Police Chief, Arjunaidi Mohammad classified the case under Section 506 of the Criminal Procedure Code. Finally, Azwan Ali and Ummi Hafilda reconciled.

Azwan slammed the credibility of the judges of the reality program MasterChef Selebriti Malaysia due to the lack of transparency in the judging after he was eliminated from the program. During Ramadan 2014, Azwan was heavily criticized by netizens and Ramadan bazaar vendors for criticizing the quality of some of the breaking-of-the-fast food sold by bazaar vendors, which he described as 'tasting like garbage'. When the country held a National Day of Mourning, actor Sharnaaz Ahmad criticized Azwan's action of taking a selfie while Malaysians were mourning the return of the remains of this citizen who died in the Malaysia Airlines (MAS) MH17 plane tragedy. Azwan, who attended the public meeting at Dataran Merdeka, said he did not take a selfie during the meditation ceremony, but rather before, and that his purpose in uploading the photo was to share his grief. Because of this issue, Azwan and Sharnaaz exchanged tweets on Twitter defending their respective actions, until the Malaysian Employees Association intervened.

In 2015, Azwan had a dispute with his Twitter followers because the fan wrote the word 'menate' which he thought was mixed with obscene words towards him, which was actually the name of a restaurant. Azwan finally apologized to Menate Restaurant after the dispute episode lasted so long that it involved the restaurant's good name. The provocation between netizens, Azwan, fans and the restaurant led to the issue of insulting the Malay race, which attracted the attention of the Mufti of Perak, Tan Sri Dr Harussani Zakaria, who reprimanded Azwan for swearing on social media, as well as receiving a warning from the President of the Malaysian Association of Dignity and Friendship (MJMM), Abdul Rani Kulup, who wanted to file a police report. Actor and artist Azhar Sulaiman also reprimanded Azwan as a friend but was reprimanded by the celebrity. Shortly after, Azwan was once again faced with legal action by Tirana Products Sdn Bhd, a soy sauce manufacturing company which claimed that Azwan had issued defamatory statements and videos against the company's products.

On 18 February 2017, Azwan's mother, Che Tom Yahaya, had died but Azwan was not seen attending the funeral and taking the body to the cemetery. Azwan refused to reveal the cause of the dispute between his family and said that only his siblings knew his story. Azwan once uploaded a video and several pictures with captions on his Instagram account criticizing the actions of a drama producer Sheila Rusly who was said to produce a drama that was like garbage when watching the drama "Misteri Wan Peah" to the point that Sheila and her husband responded to the criticism while inviting the actors in the drama to also criticize Azwan; because of this controversy, the sign saying "Are you not in school? Are you a SRP graduate?" went viral. The Azwan-Sheila feud ended in 2019 when the two forgave each other.

During the 2018 Malaysian general election, Azwan contested as an independent candidate (using the Elephant symbol) in the Bukit Antarabangsa State Legislative Assembly to oppose his brother who is also PKR Deputy President, Datuk Seri Mohamed Azmin Ali. The decision to contest was made following the support of many parties, especially his loyal fans in ensuring that the struggle to bring down Mohamed Azmin, became a reality. Although his election campaign went viral, Azwan only received 90 votes and lost his betting money.

In 2019, Azwan made a public apology to his fellow artist and brother Azmin before announcing that he would be moving to the United Kingdom. Azwan lived there until he had to return due to personal matters and was finally forced to settle back in Malaysia due to the spread of the COVID-19 pandemic.

=== 2020s ===
As a result of a misunderstanding during a food party organized by Dato Seri Vida and his daughter Cik B, Azwan cursed the family with hurtful words. After being threatened with a lawsuit, Azwan finally apologized. During the Malaysian Movement Control Order 2020-21, Azwan's behavior of scolding people who disobeyed the Movement Control Order, which went viral since yesterday, became a topic of attention after some people edited the audio and produced another video clip that went viral. However, Azwan was fined RM17,000 by the Putrajaya Sessions Court, after pleading guilty to uploading a video insulting Putrajaya Hospital staff in handling the COVID-19 outbreak on 24 March 2020. He was also criticized for condemning Siti Nurhaliza's action of leaving early after making a special appearance with Bob Yusof who replaced her on stage, as well as questioning singer Naim Daniel's victory at the 34th Juara Lagu Awards which he described as not being famous. After that, Azwan once questioned the victory of singer Chubb-E for the same reason at the 33rd Daily News Popular Star Awards. Both young singers responded politely to Azwan's harsh comments and even admitted that Azwan was their idol in the art industry.
