= The Nite Nite Show with Alvin Anthons =

Malaysian late-night talk show

- Title card
- Genre: Talk; Variety show
- Created by: Alvin Anthons; Anna Erni Thomas; Rubern Spexx Naidu
- Presented by: Alvin Anthons (2020–present)
- Country of origin: Malaysia
- Original language: English
- No. of episodes: 13; (list of episodes)

Production
- Executive producer: Alvin Anthons
- Running time: Varies
- Production companies: Mainstream Entertainment (M) Sdn Bhd (2020–present); X Stream Solutions Sdn Bhd (2020–present)

Original release
- Release: June 18, 2020 – present

The Nite Nite Show with Alvin Anthons is a Malaysian late-night talk show, which premiered in June 2020 during the COVID-19 pandemic. Hosted by Alvin Anthons, the show is broadcast live on Instagram amidst a studio set and a live DJ, featuring special guests that come on live via Instagram remotely and talk about the trending issues and participate in unique game segments, tailor-made for each guest, in real-time.

Since its premier, The Nite Nite Show with Alvin Anthons, proved itself different from other late-night shows, with more of a reliance on its entertainment value with its line-up of A-list guests and unique games on the show. Upon its first week of release, positive reviews of the show dubbed Alvin as a World-class host and ranks the show to be of the same quality as Hollywood produced late-night talk shows.

The Nite Nite Show with Alvin Anthons, earned a National Record verified by Malaysia Book of Records for the First Instagram Live Broadcasting Talk Show.

== Production ==
Amidst the pandemic came the need to amplify the adoption of digital as more people are glued to their mobile phones. Although Instagram Live has been commonly used by many, The Nite Nite Show with Alvin Anthons is the first Malaysian live entertainment program broadcast on Instagram, amidst a studio set and a live DJ, featuring special guests to come on board via Instagram remotely and talk about trending issues and participate in unique game segments, tailor-made for each guest. It is the first time a show is able to configure a Live-Multi-Output show that includes simultaneous broadcasting of visuals of both parties, along with the Host's audio, the Remote Guest audio and DJ live music, throughout the show in a high-quality production.

== Episodes ==
The English format late-night talk show has just concluded Season 1 at the end of July 2020 has featured 13 A-list celebrities from Malaysia, Singapore and the United States of America, of various talents. The line-up of guest that has appeared on the show so far are; Dato' Hans Isaac, Dato' Norman Abdul Halim KRU, Gurmit Singh aka Phua Chu Kang Pte Ltd, Amber Chia, Allan Wu of The Amazing Race and Justin Bratton Asia's Got Talent, to mention a few. The program airs twice a week, on Instagram (@Alvinanthons), every Tuesday & Thursday at 10 pm with a fresh take on a live broadcast talk show.

| No. | Original release date | Guest(s) |
|---|---|---|
| 1 | June 18, 2020 | Hans Issac |
| 2 | June 23, 2020 | Ferhad |
| 3 | June 25, 2020 | Allan Wu, The Amazing Race |
| 4 | June 30, 2020 | Soo Wincci |
| 5 | July 2, 2020 | Norman Abdul Halim KRU |
| 6 | July 7, 2020 | Bon Zainal |
| 7 | July 9, 2020 | Gurmit Singh Phua Chu Kang Pte Ltd |
| 8 | July 14, 2020 | Sherson Lian, Chef on Asian Food Network & Media Prima Berhad |
| 9 | July 16, 2020 | Awi Rafael |
| 10 | July 21, 2020 | Amber Chia |
| 11 | July 23, 2016 | Justin Bratton Asia's Got Talent |
| 12 | July 28, 2020 | DJ Dave |
| 13 | July 30, 2020 | Harvinth Skin |

== Recurring Segments ==
The concept of the show centers a high-energy entertainment talkshow concept that not only features A-list guests but also ensures its content is unique and entertaining. The entertainment-worthiness of the show that has ensured steady viewership lies in the unique games created for each guest which utilises unconventional mechanics and props. Each hilarious episode features interviews with guests and two game segments; 1) a unique game for each guests such as - Inhaling Helium while reading a tongue twister, and singing a song while eating a bitter gourd. 2) Rapid Fire - where guests are required to answer heated and sometimes embarrassing questions within a short period of time with weird punishments if they fail to do so.

The show also highly engages the audience in its games and program of each episode for example, including the audience as part of the games that guests are required to play and weekly contest for audience to participate and win official merchandise.

== Recognition ==
The Nite Nite Show with Alvin Anthons, earned a National Record verified by The Malaysia Book of Records for the First Instagram Live Broadcasting Talk Show. The record is based on The Nite Nite Show with Alvin Anthons being the first Malaysian live entertainment program broadcast on Instagram, amidst a studio set and a live DJ, featuring special guests to come on board via Instagram remotely and talk about trending issues and participate in unique game segments, tailor-made for each guest. It is the first time a show is able to configure a Live-Multi-Output show that includes simultaneous broadcasting of visuals of both parties, along with the Host audio, the Remote Guest audio and DJ live music, throughout the show in a high-quality production.
