= Alvin Anthons =

Malaysian entertainer (born 1976)

- Born: 4 December 1976 (age 49); Kuala Lumpur, Malaysia
- Genres: Pop, rock
- Occupations: Entertainer, TV Show Host, Professional Emcee, Recording Artist, Singer, Radio DJ, Actor
- Instruments: Guitar, drums, percussions
- Years active: 2000–present
- Label: Wake the Baby Records Warner Music
- Website: alvinanthons.com

Alvin Anthons (born 4 December 1976 in Kuala Lumpur) is an entertainer, TV show host, recording artist, singer, radio DJ and actor. Of Malaysian Indian descent, Anthons sings in Malay and English. He is known for his work in television as a host of Let's Talk and as the host of late-night talk show 'The Nite Nite Show with Alvin Anthons'.

In September 2013, he released his self-titled debut album, which features eight tracks produced by Ajai. The album also includes collaborations with Syko G and features Daly Filsuf of Singapore. It also contains a special recording of "Menjelang Hari Raya", once made popular by DJ Dave.

In June 2020, Anthons is the host of a late-night talk show called The Nite Nite Show with Alvin Anthons. The Nite Nite Show with Alvin Anthons is a Malaysian late-night talk show that is broadcast live twice weekly on Instagram amidst a studio set and a live DJ, featuring special guests that come on live via Instagram remotely and talk about the trending issues and participate in unique game segments, tailor-made for each guest. The Nite Nite Show with Alvin Anthons, earned a National Record verified by Malaysia Book of Records for the First Instagram Live Broadcasting Talk Show.

== Career ==
=== Overview ===
Alvin Anthons began his journey into show business at the age of 19, when he hosted his first dinner show. Since then, he has continued hosting dinner shows and eventually established his own event management company, Mainstream Entertainment (M) Sdn Bhd. He is an active international performing entertainer / professional emcee, television & talk show host, speaker and recording artist. As a presenter, awards host and broadcaster, Alvin has presented live shows and live events around the globe. Alvin also dabbles as an actor, radio announcer, model, TVC and voice-over talent.

== Professional emcee ==
Throughout the years, Anthons has not only emceed for events in Malaysia but also abroad. Just to name a few, Korea, Egypt, Thailand, UAE and France are some of the countries he has travelled to just to entertain his audiences. Alvin Anthons was the first male emcee to ever host the Miss World Malaysia Pageant. He went on hosting the prestigious Pageant for consecutive years. Apart from that, Alvin was the Master of Ceremony for the Association of Space Explorers' 23rd Planetary Congress, where Malaysia was the first Southeast Asian country to host the six-day congress.

== Talk show host ==
=== Let's Talk ===
Alvin Anthons helmed his own talk show, Let's Talk (talk show), a prime time entertainment talk show programme on Radio Televisyen Malaysia TV2 which ran for three seasons, garnering over one million viewers. During the course of the programme, the show has had local and foreign celebrities, corporate and political figures, interesting professionals and sports personalities. Let's Talk aired every Thursday at 9:30pm on Radio Televisyen Malaysia TV2. Produced by KRU Motion Pictures Sdn Bhd, Let's Talk (talk show) is casual and fun, often leaves audiences entertained with either a song and dance, a fun demonstration or a mere impromptu comedy act. The program was recorded in front of live studio audience amidst a set that featured Alvin Anthons as the talk show host and two to three guests per episode.

=== The Nite Nite Show with Alvin Anthons ===
The Nite Nite Show with Alvin Anthons is a Malaysian late-night talk show, which premiered in June 2020 with Alvin Anthons as its host. The show is broadcast live on Instagram amidst a studio set and a live DJ, featuring special guests that come on live via Instagram remotely and talk about the trending issues and participate in unique game segments, tailor-made for each guest, in real-time.

Since its premier, Alvin Anthons proved himself different from other late-night shows, with more of a reliance on the show's entertainment value with its line-up of A-list guests and hilarious games on the show. Upon its first week of release, positive reviews of the show dubbed Alvin as a World-class host and ranks the show to be of the same quality as Hollywood produced late-night talk shows.

The Nite Nite Show with Alvin Anthons, earned a National Record verified by The Malaysia Book of Records for the First Instagram Live Broadcasting Talk Show. The record is based on The Nite Nite Show with Alvin Anthons being the first Malaysian live entertainment program broadcast on Instagram, amidst a studio set and a live DJ, featuring special guests to come on board via Instagram remotely and talk about trending issues and participate in unique game segments, tailor-made for each guest. It is the first time a show is able to configure a Live-Multi-Output show that includes simultaneous broadcasting of visuals of both parties, along with the Host audio, the Remote Guest audio and DJ live music, throughout the show in a high-quality production.

The English format late-night talk show has just concluded Season 1 at the end of July 2020 has featured 13 A-list celebrities from Malaysia, Singapore and the United States of America, of various talents. The line-up of guest that has appeared on the show so far are; Dato' Hans Isaac, Dato' Norman Abdul Halim KRU, Gurmit Singh aka Phua Chu Kang Pte Ltd, Amber Chia, Allan Wu of The Amazing Race and Justin Bratton Asia's Got Talent, to mention a few. The program airs twice a week, on Instagram (@Alvinanthons), every Tuesday & Thursday at 10 pm with a fresh take on a live broadcast talk show.

==== List of episodes ====
No.	Original release date	Guest(s)
1	18 June 2020	Hans Issac
2	23 June 2020	Ferhad
3	25 June 2020	Allan Wu, The Amazing Race
4	30 June 2020	Soo Wincci
5	2 July 2020	Norman Abdul Halim KRU
6	7 July 2020	Bon Zainal
7	9 July 2020	Gurmit Singh Phua Chu Kang Pte Ltd
8	14 July 2020	Sherson Lian, Chef on Asian Food Network & Media Prima Berhad
9	16 July 2020	Awi Rafael
10	21 July 2020	Amber Chia
11	23 July 2016	Justin Bratton Asia's Got Talent
12	28 July 2020	DJ Dave
13	30 July 2020	Harvinth Skin

== Music career ==
While Alvin Anthons has been in the public eye in various roles, singing professionally has always been a wish he kept close to his heart for many years. A meeting with composer Ajai marked the start of his singing career.

=== The release of Berdua ===
"Berdua" is the first single released under Alvin Anthons' self-titled debut album. A mid-tempo, pop-rock song, "Berdua" talks about learning from past mistakes, moving on, and being a better person in a new relationship. The single earned him a nomination in the VIMA 2013 Music Awards for the Best Music Video category.

Aside from receiving airplay, "Berdua" was No.1 on Cat's FM's Top 50 Chart for 3 consecutive weeks. Besides that, the single was also on Era FM's Carta Prebiu for 5 consecutive weeks and eventually garnered the most votes on the chart. Alvin Anthons won the privilege of donating a sum of RM10,000 (Malaysian Ringgit) to his charity of choice Yayasan Chow Kit, when he won the Tesco Celebrity Charity Hunt.

=== Bending genres – The Release of Berdua Remix ===
With the positive response received from his first single, Alvin released a "Berdua Remix", mixed by Syko-G (world renown mixer – "Godfather of Electronica" /Club Hitz-Hitz.fm) featuring Daly Filsuf of Singapore (former member of Ahli Fiqir). The remix, classified as psycho electro music, with a twist of rap reintroduces "Berdua" from a different point of view. The track was on Era FM's Carta Prebiu & can be heard being played at the hottest clubs in KL.

=== Second single: Sally ===
Composed and written by renowned composer Ajai, "Sally" speaks about the disappointment of being in a relationship with an unfaithful partner and the feeling of betrayal, portrayed in its lyrics. The track is one of the six songs which will be featured in his self-titled debut album, released September 2013. Filmed in Jakarta, Indonesia, the music video for "Sally" is a sequel to "Berdua", which stars Anthons as himself, alongside Indonesian model, Vinsensia Rhessa Runtu.

=== Debut album: Alvin Anthons ===
In September 2013, he released his self-titled debut album through Warner Music. It features eight tracks that are produced by local award-winning singer/songwriter Ajai. The album also sees collaborations with the world-renowned mixer, Syko G and Daly Filsuf. It also contains a special recording of the famous Aidilfitri song 'Menjelang Hari Raya' once made popular by Datuk DJ Dave.

Having done its complete mastering in the Grossinger Mastering studio in New York, the album completes Alvin's dreams of becoming a recording artiste.

== Other notable works ==
Alvin Anthons was involved in various television commercials such as Digi, Twisties and Sunsilk, which was aired across Malaysia. He also played the role of Tiger Woods in Nike's International Corporate Video. In addition to that, Alvin lends his voice to various radio commercials as a voice-over talent.

He was also invited to deejay on Selangor FM. He hosts the rush-hour morning show on Selangor FM (100.9FM) on a weekly basis.

Following his passion for food, Alvin opened a restaurant specialising in authentic South-Indian banana leaf cuisine, called "Sri Suria Curry House". It all began with his travel to India where he embarked on a journey of food discovery. Upon returning home with his experiences, he worked alongside his mother to incorporate an extensive menu combining the best of Indian cuisine and his mothers hereditary recipes. The restaurant is located in Petaling Jaya, Malaysia and started its operations in April 2013. Sri Suria Curry House has since received two nominations in the Time Out Kuala Lumpur Food Awards 2013 for the category of Best Indian Restaurant and Best Cheap Eats.

Alvin Anthons was named Best-Dressed Malaysian Man of the Month for August 2020 by Gentleman's Code Magazine.

In the attempt to break the world record for the Longest DJ Live Streaming non-stop for a duration of 228 hours with 126 DJs across 8 studios by Independence 2020, Alvin Anthons was invited to be alongside DJ Jason Martin, for the final hour of the record breaking attempt, which led up to the countdown of Malaysia's 63rd Independence Day on 31 August 2020. The record was successfully set in The Malaysia Book of Records for the Longest DJ live Stream Record and Most Number of DJs Record.

== Videography ==
The official music video for "Berdua" was filmed in Jakarta, Indonesia with the creative help & direction of Almer Lipasha under InHouseKreasi Productions. The music video stars Anthons as himself and Indonesian model, Vinsensia Rhessa Runtu as his muse.

Alvin Anthons was in Jakarta, Indonesia again, to film his second music video for his latest single, "Sally". This second music video is a sequel to "Berdua", which stars Anthons as himself once again alongside Indonesian model, Vinsensia Rhessa Runtu.

== Discography ==
=== Debut album: Alvin Anthons (2013) ===
- Berdua
- Sally
- Suatu Hari Nanti
- Cinta Kamu
- Berdua Remix
- Menjelang Hari Raya – (Acoustic Version)

=== Singles ===
- Berdua (2011)
- Sally (2013)
