= Ary Malik =

Malaysian actress

Ari Malik
- Born: Nurita Maliha Aryanee bint Abdul Malik; 16 October 1971; Kuala Lumpur, Malaysia
- Died: 28 February 2017 (aged 45); Ampang, Selangor, Malaysia
- Occupations: Actress, VJ, media personality
- Years active: 1989–2017
- Spouse: Shahrul Nizam Shaharuddin (m. 1997–2017)
- Children: 3

Nurita Maliha Aryanee "Ary" Abdul Malik (October 16, 1971 – February 28, 2017) was a Malaysian actress and television personality, and sister of singer Min Malik. Throughout her two decades of entertainment career, Ary is best known as a VJ on MTV and became one of the first contestants of MasterChef Malaysia. She died on February 28, 2017, after a year of battling ovarian cancer.

== Early and personal life ==
Ary was born and raised in Kuala Lumpur. Her father was a military pensioner. Her younger sister, Yasmin Malik or better known as Min Malik is a famous singer of the 90s, Min popular with the song "Flora Cinta". She married creative director Shahrul Nizam Shahruddin or Sha Bromo from Singapore in 1997, and was they had three daughters Nuhr Zoe Iman (born 1998), Dinda Pelangi Timor (born 2004) and Ratu Chinta Mecca (born 2006).

== Filmography ==
=== Film ===
Year	Title	Role	Director	Notes
2001	Lips to Lips	Ary	Amir Muhammad	

=== Drama ===
Year	Title	Role	Director	Notes
2000	Kolej			Malaysian-Indonesian joint production
2002	Spanar Jaya		NTV7	
2004	Cinta Tsunami	Marina	Astro Ria	

=== Television film ===
Year	Title	Role	Director	Notes
2003	Neon	Saira	Astro Ria	
2016	Menanti Awan		TV2	Last TV appearance

=== Television ===
Year	Title	Role	Director	Notes
1990s–2000s	MTV	Herself	MTV	
2003	Muzik Muzik	Herself	TV3	
2011	MasterChef Malaysia	Herself/participant	Astro Ria	
