= Norman Musa =

Malaysian businessman

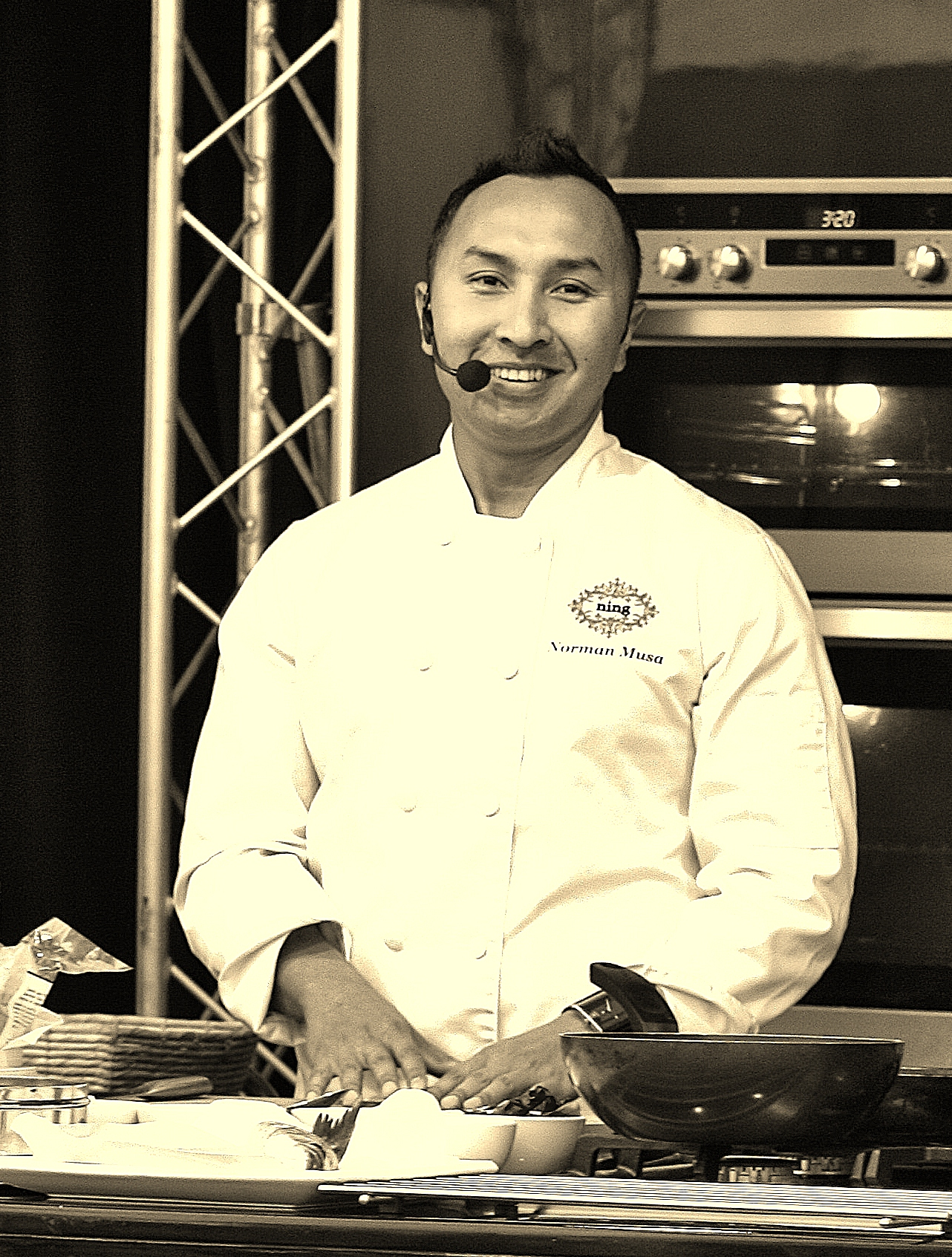
- Norman in a kitchen
- Born: Norman bin Musa; November 20, 1974 (age 51); Butterworth, Penang, Malaysia
- Education: University of Portsmouth
- Occupations: Chef, author, restaurateur and entrepreneur

Norman bin Musa (born November 20, 1974) is a Malaysian chef, author, television host, and restaurateur. He co-founded the restaurant Ning in Manchester and has served as the Executive Chef of Wah Nam Hong in The Hague. He is the author of Amazing Malaysian, a cookbook featuring Malaysian.

== Early life and education ==
Norman was raised in Sungai Nyior, Butterworth, Malaysia. He studied quantity surveying at the University of Portsmouth on a scholarship, beginning in 1994.

== Career ==
After graduating in 1997, Norman began his career as a quantity surveyor in Bournemouth, Southern England. He relocated to London in 1999, and in 2003, he moved to Manchester where he continued working as a quantity surveyor.

In 2006, Norman began designing Ning, a restaurant in the Northern Quarter of Manchester. Ning opened in December 2006, with a menu featuring Malaysian and Thai cuisine. He worked as head chef at the restaurant for the first year, then returned to his role as a quantity surveyor. In 2009, he left quantity surveying to work full-time at Ning. A second Ning restaurant operated in York from 2012 to 2014.

In 2012, Norman won the Hospitality Guild's Young Hall of Fame award. He was also runner-up for the Asian & Oriental Chef of the Year category at the Asian Curry Awards in 2013.

In November 2014, the Kuala Lumpur Mayor's office announced Norman's appointment as the Kuala Lumpur Food Ambassador for the European market.

In April 2016, Norman was featured by the Malaysian newspaper, The Star, as one of seven Malaysian chefs working abroad.

In March 2017, Norman was disqualified for five years for employing illegal workers at Ning. The disqualification followed an investigation by the Insolvency Service, which found that Norman failed to ensure the business completed relevant immigration checks on its employees, resulting in the employment of two illegal workers.

In March 2018, Norman began teaching at Seasoned Cookery School Derbyshire.

In May 2018, Norman ran five-day cooking demonstrations and masterclasses at the Tong Tong Fair in The Hague, The Netherlands. The festival had over 80,000 visitors. Norman was also commissioned to create a Malaysian-inspired breakfast for the Mercure Hotel in The Hague to be served during the festival.

On 25 June 2018, Norman taught at the Foodworks Cookery School in Cheltenham. A week later on 4 July 2018, Norman released an open letter on social media and his website to his followers regarding the illegal workers incident and the consequences.

On 22 January 2019, Norman was appointed Executive Chef for Wah Nam Hong Restaurant in Leidsenhage, The Netherlands.

Norman filmed his third cooking show East West Bake in Cheshire, United Kingdom, from 11 March 2019 until 17 March 2019. He co-hosted the show with Chef Brian Mellor, which was for the Malaysian TV channel Saluran Okey.

On 18 March, Norman ran a cooking demonstration featuring Malaysian fruits at the Unesco Headquarters in Paris. The event was launched by Deputy Malaysian Prime Minister Dato Sri Dr Wan Azizah, who participated in the cooking demonstration alongside him.

He has conducted cooking demonstrations and workshops to promote Malaysian cuisine in The Netherlands.

In March 2019, Norman was announced by Holland-based Big Green Egg as one of the chefs who would run a cooking workshop at their annual Big Green Egg's Flavour Fair (16 June 2019) in Lisse, The Netherlands. His workshops for the event were fully booked.

Norman wrote the foreword for Francis Kuijk's second Dutch cookbook Basisboek Indonesisch, which was published in March 2019.

An article featuring Norman and his recipes appeared in the Malaysian magazine Her World m in April 2019.

His recipes for the new Dutch cookbook Magisch Maleisisch were featured in the Elle Eten magazine for the May 2019 issue.

Norman launched his Dutch cookbook Magisch Maleisich, the translation of his Amazing Malaysian cookbook, on 4 June 2019 at Keizer Culinair in Amsterdam. The book was published by Podium Uitgever.

On 22 and 23 June 2019, he ran cooking demonstrations for the Malaysian Food Fair, hosted by the Malaysian Embassy in The Hague.

On 24 July 2019, his laksa dish was mentioned in an article in The Guardian.

An article about Norman's career and his work promoting Malaysian cuisine in the United Kingdom and Europe was included in the Malay Language Standard 6 School Textbook by the Malaysian Ministry of Education. The textbook is intended for students aged 12+ and is used in primary schools in Malaysia.

Two of his recipes from Amazing Malaysian were selected by Josh Emett, to be included in his cookbook The Recipe, which comprises over 300 recipes from 150 chefs and cooks. The book was published in May 2019.

His cooking show East West Bake a 13-episode show that was filmed in March 2019 with Chef Brian Mellor, in Chester, United Kingdom, aired on Malaysian TV Okey, starting on 9 January 2020.

In February 2020, Norman filmed his fifth cooking show, Explore the Scent Holland, for Malaysian TV. This 13-episode show featured Norman with his Dutch chef friends, local Dutch attractions, and Dutch cuisine. Norman prepared Malaysian cuisine. The show aired on Malaysian TV and is available for online streaming as of October 2020.

In May 2020, he teamed up with seven other Malaysian-born chefs to establish Masters of Malaysian Cuisine—a campaign to promote Malaysian food through live online cooking demonstrations in partnership with Tourism Malaysia and the Ministry of Agriculture and Food Industries.

From 25 September to 4 October 2020, Norman introduced the Dutch market to the Malaysian food brand Adabi through Wah Nam Hong Supermarket, during a campaign organised by the Ministry of Agriculture and Food Industries Malaysia to promote Malaysian fruits and products.

In October 2020, Norman, with Jackie M. and Kerry Torrens, launched the S.E.A. Food Revolution online campaign and workshop series, to inspire people to cook healthy Southeast Asian dishes and promote a healthy dietary approach.

On 20 October 2020, Norman was a speaker for the online webinar organised by Taylor's University with the topic "Future Chef: Developing Adaptability Skills."

In December 2020, he was appointed as the Adjunct Senior Lecturer by Taylor's University, commencing on 1 January 2021. His two-year contract entails producing online lectures and organising student events.

In October 2021, Norman was appointed as Executive Chef of the Kuala Lumpur Restaurant and Bar in Horsforth, Leeds.
