= The Royal London Circus =

The Royal London Circus was a famous travelling circus founded by Paul L. B. Lee, international producer, impressario, and showman, which was based in Malaysia and has ties to the United Kingdom's historic Chipperfield Circus. Established in 1988, the Royal London Circus was the result of Lee's acquisition of the Chipperfield Circus, where he was business partners with Richard (Dickie) Chipperfield. The Royal London Circus became Malaysia's inaugural international circus production and set the standard for circus shows in the region, reaching the peak of its production size in 2003 with over 70 animals and performers from almost 20 countries, until its end around 2008. It was renowned for bringing world-class circus entertainment to audiences across Southeast and East Asia and was one of the last circuses in Asia to showcase live animal acts in the classic circus style (including lions, tigers, elephants, horses, bears etc.).
