= Chef Wan =

Malaysian celebrity chef (born 1958)

Yang Berbahagia Adjunct Prof. Datuk Dr. Chef Wan PMW DSAP
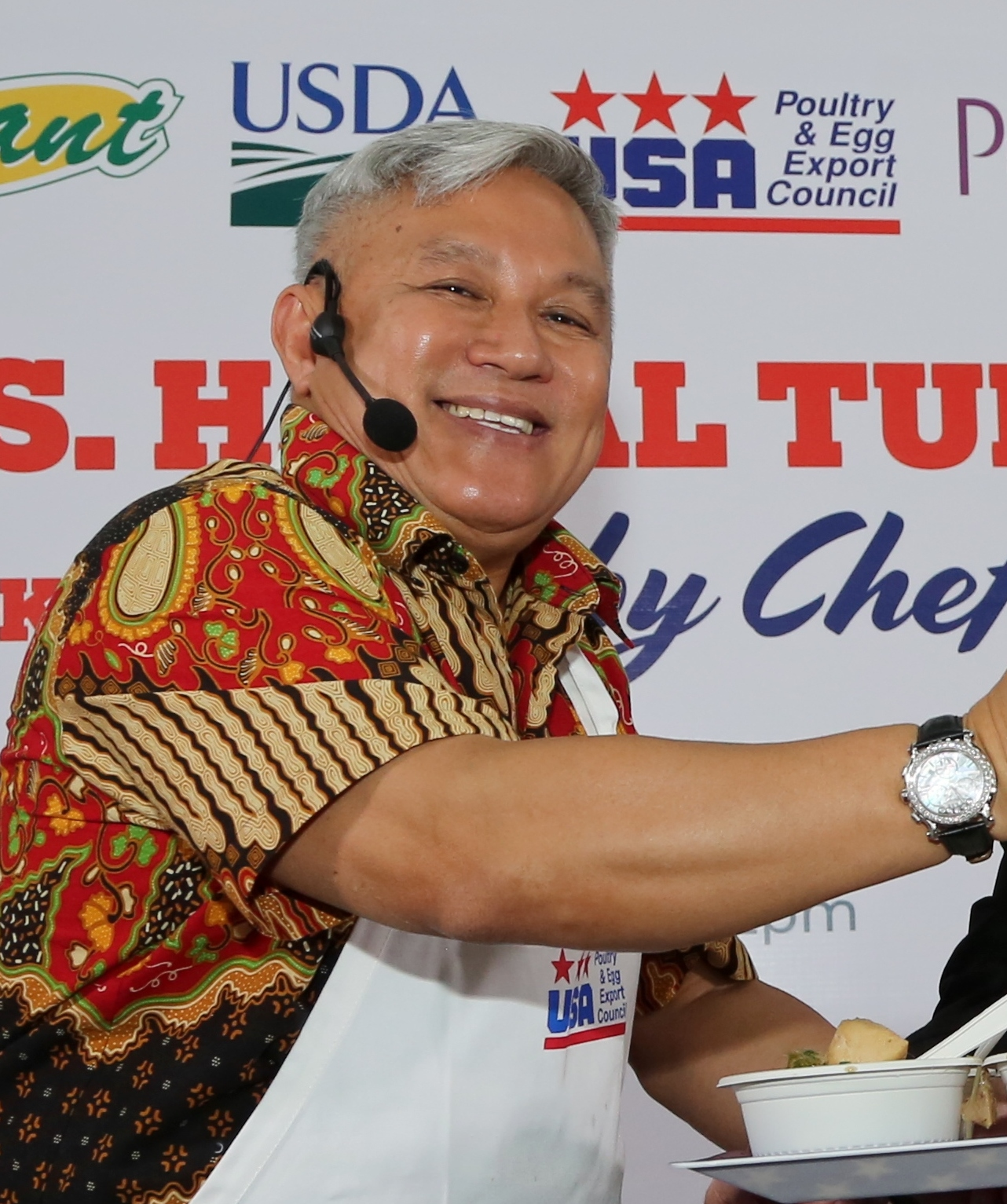
- Chef Wan in 2019
- Born: Redzuawan bin Ismail; 6 January 1958 (age 68); Colony of Singapore
- Citizenship: Malaysia
- Education: California Culinary Academy
- Occupations: Celebrity chef; television host; actor; restaurateur; entrepreneur
- Years active: 1990–present
- Television: Best Wan (Asian Food Channel); East bites West (National Geographic); Usik-usik Chef Wan (TV9); Famili Ceria (ntv7)
- Spouse: Norhayati binti Ayub
- Children: Serina Redzuawan; Muhammad Zainudin Redzuawan (Chef Riz)
- Parents: Ismail bin Mohd. Nor (father); Noraini Abdullah née Tan Soh Neo (mother)
- Website: chefwanlifestyle.com.my

Redzuawan bin Ismail (born 6 January 1958), better known by his stage name Chef Wan, is a Malaysian celebrity chef, television host, actor, restaurateur and entrepreneur.

== Personal life ==
Chef Wan is a second generation Federal Land Development Authority (Felda) settler who was born and raised at Sungai Koyan Felda, Lipis, Pahang.

In an interview in February 2010, Chef Wan said that he is of mixed ancestry; his father has Malay and Javanese ancestry from Indonesia while his mother has Chinese and Japanese ancestry. Chef Wan has two children. One is Serina Redzuawan, an actress who has appeared in several Malaysian drama series; Chef Wan's son, Muhammad Nazri Redzuawan who is commonly known as Chef Riz, is following in his father's footsteps by becoming a chef as well. In 10 October 2026, Chef Wan revealed to the media that his great-grandfather was a Kapitan from Sarawak known as Ong Tiang Swee.

== Career ==
Chef Wan's early career was as an accountant. He says after seeing the popularity of many types of Asian food in Western countries he decided to promote Malaysia and other South East Asian countries using their food.

Chef Wan has an associate degree in Professional Chef Training and Hotel Management from the California Culinary Academy and a Ritz Escoffier Diploma from the Hôtel Ritz Paris. In 2009, he won the Best Celebrity Television Chef of the Gourmand World Cookbook Awards.

Chef Wan is a Tourism Malaysia culinary ambassador. He is currently a brand ambassador for AirAsia.

In 2005, Anthony Bourdain introduced Chef Wan to American audiences during his trip to Malaysia in season one, episode five of No Reservations. In 2009, Chef Wan appeared in Episode 3 of Rick Stein's television series Far Eastern Odyssey (BBC).

On 26 July 2018, Chef Wan's Kitchen at Esplanade Mall ceased operations after only a year. Chef Wan said, "It's not because the cooks are not good, and neither are the staff to blame. The culinary team just did not follow my recipes... and as a result, many diners were not satisfied... It's better to close it than to invite further criticism from guests who enjoy what I cook."

Chef Wan was the recipient of THE 2019 Felda Icon Award at Felda Settlers Day in 2019.

In March 2021, viral YouTube comedian Nigel Ng, better known as Uncle Roger, visited Chef Wan's restaurant for a video shoot. Chef Wan mentioned how he was offered to be on Gelak Gempak Selebrity, a new stand-up comedy show, but declined the offer, stating that he preferred to be "spontaneously funny" and "didn't have much confidence in the field of stand-up comedy".

== Controversies ==
In 2014, Chef Wan posted a photo on his Instagram account of an object which he linked as debris from the missing Malaysia Airlines Flight 370 and subsequently dismissed the debris as "an old toilet door from Cik Kiah's house". He was criticized for making an inappropriate joke with regards to the missing plane. He took down the post and defended the joke as a means to gauge public reaction and was further criticized for it.

In 2015, while criticising a CNN ranking of the world's best food destinations for its low placement of Malaysia, Chef Wan stated that "[the] Philippines is known to have the worst food in Asia, ask any chefs and they will tell you I am right".

In 2017, Chef Wan, being the son of a Felda settler, vented his frustrations and disappointments over the Felda scandals by calling the agency "Felda then, Failed dah now" and condemned the culprits. On a cooking programme and campaign visit to the Felda community during the January 2019 Cameron Highlands by-election, he said he wanted to slap former prime minister Najib Razak and ex-Felda chairman Mohd Isa Abdul Samad for mismanaging the agency. He apologized later for his coarse language.

After he was awarded the 2019 Felda Icon, Chef Wan was criticized for claiming that some of the Felda settlers were lazy and tended to "breed like cats" for having polygamous marriages and large families, and becoming complacent in their rich and comfortable lives. He stressed the importance of hard work and a need to avoid laziness among the settlers based on his own observations living in the Felda settlements. Najib Razak embroiled himself in a war of words with Chef Wan over his remarks this time. Chef Wan has told the disgraced ex-PM to 'shut his mouth' and 'don't bark like a mad dog'.

== Filmography ==
=== Film ===
Year	Title	Role	Notes
1996	Lurah Dendam	Rizal	First appearance
1997	Baginda	Teacher Ismail	
2000	Soal Hati	Naza	
2005	Senario XX	Dad Siti	
2011	Karipap-Karipap Cinta	Himself	
2015	Gangsterrock Kasi Sengat	Himself	Special appearance

=== Television ===
Year	Title	Role	Notes
1999–2001	Kampung Boy	Himself	Voice-acting, 1 episode

== Honours ==
=== Honours of Malaysia ===
- Federal Territory (Malaysia)
  - Commander of the Order of the Territorial Crown (PMW) – Datuk (2010)
- Pahang
  - Knight Companion of the Order of Sultan Ahmad Shah of Pahang (DSAP) – Dato' (2016)
