= Ezad Lazim =

Malaysian singer (born 1979)

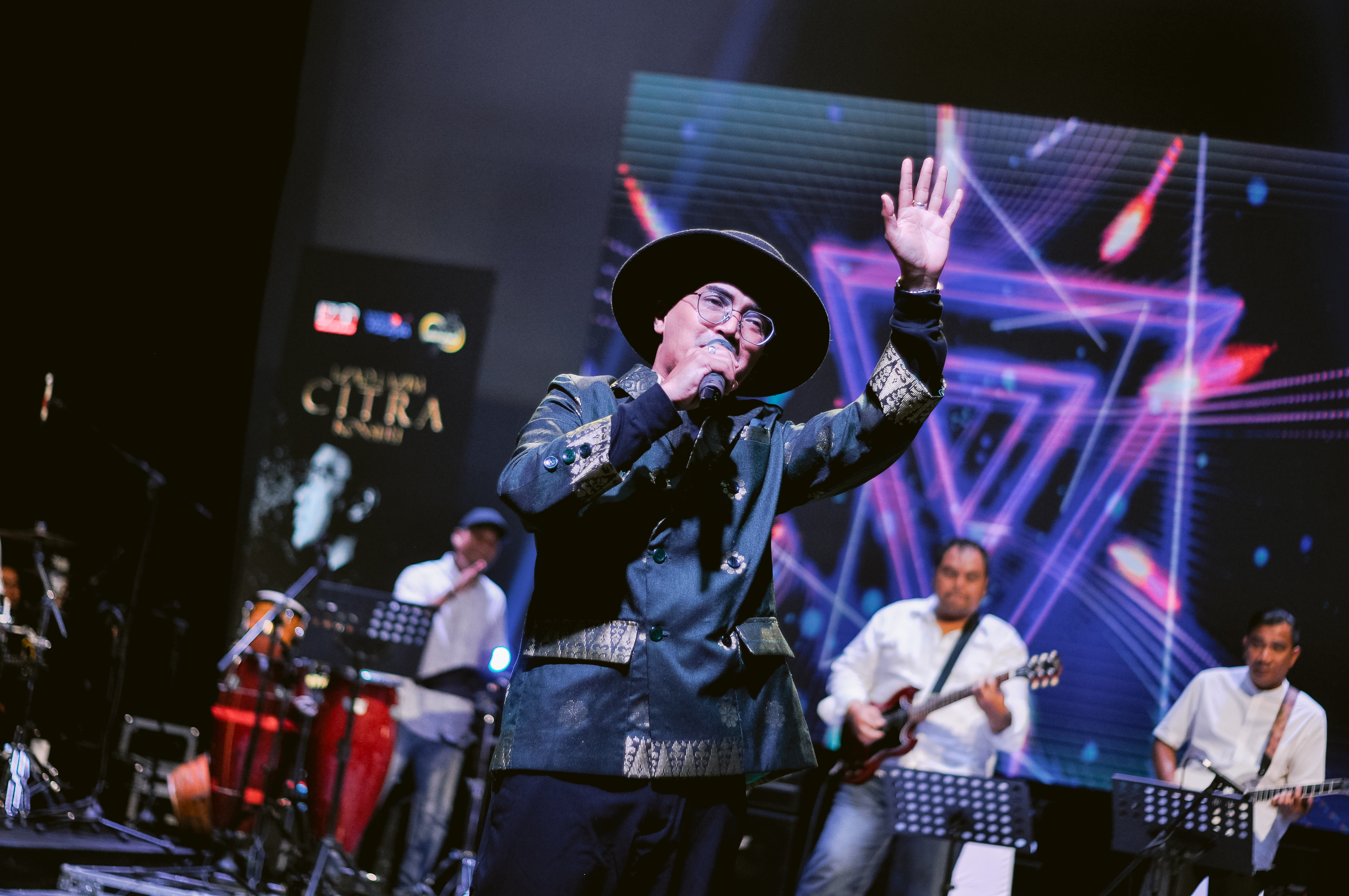
- Born: Mohd Rohaizad bin Mohd Lazim; November 30, 1979 (age 46); Alor Setar, Kedah, Malaysia
- Occupations: Singer, Musician, Actor
- Years active: 1993–present
- Spouse: Nor Azeana Haji Ramli (m. 2013)
- Children: Puteri Rania Kiesha; Putra Muhammad Darwish
- Parent(s): Mohd Lazim Ismail (father); Rosadah Jahaya (mother)
- Musical career
- Genres: Rock kapak, Hard rock, Alternative Rock, Britpop
- Instrument: Vocal ▪︎ guitar
- Labels: Ada Exists Sdn Bhd; Universal Music Malaysia; MVM Production (2011–2018); Suria Records; Broadway NuMusic (2019); DATU Entertainment (2020); NAR Records (2021)
- Member of: Exists

Mohd Rohaizad Mohd Lazim (born 30 November 1979), better known as Ezad Lazim, is a Malaysian singer, musician and actor. He began his singing career as a vocalist for Exists with the album Diammu Gunung Berapi in 1995, replacing the original vocalist, Mamat, who resigned the previous year.

In 2011, he released his first solo album titled Mengharap Bintang. The hit songs from the album were Mengharap Bintang and Percintaan Ini. This album has re-established his name in the Malaysian music industry after he left Exists in 2007.

== Discography ==
=== Solo Album ===
- Mengharap Bintang (2011)

=== Single ===
Solo

Year	Title	Album	Remarks
2002	"Renyai Di Hati"	Single	
2006	"Kau Yang Terpaling Ku Cinta"	Single	
2010	"Bertemu Cintaku"	Single	
2010	"Mengharap Bintang"	Mengharap Bintang	
2012	"Percintaan Ini"	Mengharap Bintang	
2013	"Kerana Kamu"	Single	
2016	"Demi Cinta"	Single	Ost Umairah
2017	"Kuasa Cinta"	Single	
2018	"Kesetiaan Cinta"	Single	
2019	"Luahan Cintaku"	Single	
2020	"Leka"	Single	
2021	"Jarak Waktu"	Single	
2022	"Bidadari"		

Featuring / Collaboration

Year	Title	Duet	Album
1999	"Andang Cintaku Menyala"	Safura Ya'cob	
2000	"Dua Insan"	Iva	
2015	"Hati Mati"	RJ	
2015	"Cinta Terakhir"	W.A.R.I.S	
2018	Anak Merdeka	Artis MVM MUSIC	
2019	"Lima Aksara"	Zamani	
2019	"Gelora Rindu"	Idayu	
2020	"Sampai Syurga'	Idayu	
2021	"Celup"	Red Rahimad	
2021	Tasbih Bergema Dihari Raya	Muniff Hijjaz	
2021	"Terus"	Simfoni	
2021	Lagu Rasmi Hari Sukan Negara 2021	Ewal (Kristal), Sarah Suhairi	
2022	"Meski"	Nana Karia	
2022	"Mengintai Dari Tirai Kamar"	Amsyar Lee	
2023	"Akira"	Salma Asis	
2023	"Kasihku Abadi"	In-Team	

== Filmography ==
=== Film ===
Year	Title	Character	Remark
2002	Mami Jarum	Ezad	
2003	Mistik	Hakim	
2003	Mami Jarum Junior	Ezad	
2004	Tangkai Jering	Hashim	

=== Telefilm ===
Year	Title	Caracter	Channel	Remarks
2003	Misteri Sebuah Potret		VCD	
2004	Tak Sangka No!		VCD	
2016	Veteran Rock	Latiff	TV9	
2016	Kecoh Mami Jarum Beraya			
2021	Kuba Guling Karipap Pusing!		Awesome TV	
2021	Balik Ke Idak ?		Astro Ria	

=== Drama ===
Year	Tajuk	Character	Channel	Remarks
2022	7 Hari Mencintaiku 3	Husin	TV3	
2022	Misi Anak Bulan	Rosli	TV9	

=== Television ===
Year	Title	Note	Channel	Remarks
2013	Betul ke Bohong? (Musim 4)	Special Guest	Astro Warna	Episode 3
2016	Betul ke Bohong Sayang? (Musim 8)	Duo team	Astro Warna	Episode 13 (finale)

== Song Created ==
=== From Exists Album ===
Notes :Oa refers to the original singer

Year	Album	Title	Composer	Lyric
1995	Diammu Gunung Berapi	Dalam Kenangan	Ezad	Eta
1997	Jangan Gentar	Larilah Larilah	Ezad, Ujang, Along, Mus	Kristo Bimbo
1997	Jangan Gentar	Cari Beli Pinjam Api	Ezad, Ujang, Along, Mus	Kristo Bimbo
1998	Mutan	Hero (Siapa Dia...?)	Along, Ezad, Musa, Ujang	Roshi Lee
2001	Ada	Kau Akan Pulang	Ezad	Musrad
2001	Ada	Konklusi	Exists	Musrad
2001	Ada	Frustasi	Ezad	Musrad, Tembakau

=== Other artist ===
Artist Name	Year	Song title	Work as
New Boyz	1999	Masih ada cinta	Composer

Concert	Theme	Song Task	Rank
Week 1	Kembali Menyengat	"Mengintai Dari Tirai Kamar" oa Exists	1
Week 2	Aku Dan Lagu	"Butakah Cinta" oa Spring	3
Week 3	Ada Bran?	"Mengerti" oa KRU	8
Week 4	Duet	"Di Sebalik Rahsia Cinta" oa Metropolitan (duet Adira)	9
Week 5	Hits Vaganza	"Gerhana Cinta Luka" oa Iklim	3
Week 6	Kenangan Terindah	"Cinta Melankolia" oa Aan	2
Week of Quarter Final	Rockdut (Rock + Dangdut)	"Nakal" oa nyanyian Gigi	5
Week of semifinal	Karok Tarik	"Tiada Lagi Kidungmu" oa Lefthanded	3
Final	Solo	"Nur Nilam Sari" oa Search & Awie (solo)	3rd
Final	Battle	"Apa Khabar" oa Joe Flizzow & SonaOne (battle Haiza)	3rd

=== All Stars Gegar Vaganza 2023 ===
Ezad was selected to participate in All Stars Gegar Vaganza (2023) through Hot Seat All Stars Gegar Vaganza organized by Astro. At the introduction of the participants and the first week, Ezad performed the single Slam, the song Kembali Terjalin.

Persembahan dan keputusan All Stars Gegar Vaganza (musim 10)
Concert	Theme	Song	Original Singer	Result
Minggu 1	Kembali Menyengat	Kembali Terjalin	Slam	No 9
Minggu 2	Nyanyi Ikut Tekak Sendiri	Potret	Akim &amp; The Majistret	Will be updated

Year	Event	Result	Remarks
2015	Gegar Vaganza 2	Won	Pemenang tempat ketiga.
2016	Maharaja Lawak Mega 2016	Eliminated	10th place with BOS.
2019	Muzikal Lawak Superstar	Won	Champion with Heart.
