= Malaysian rock =

Rock music scene in Malaysia

Malaysian rock music has a rich and diverse history, spanning various subgenres such as rock kapak, punk rock, hardcore, post-hardcore, metalcore, alternative rock and post-rock. Over the decades, Malaysia has developed a thriving underground music scene, with its origins rooted in the 1980s and a continuous evolution in the following decades. This genre is popular both locally and internationally, with many bands achieving success in countries such as Indonesia, Singapore, and Japan.

== Rock kapak ==
Rock kapak is considered one of the most iconic and popular types of rock in Malaysia. Emerging in the late 1980s, it is characterized by its heavy guitar riffs, melodic vocals, and often emotionally charged lyrics. Pioneering bands such as Search, Wings, XPDC, and Kembara helped define this genre, combining elements of classic rock with local musical influences. These bands enjoyed massive popularity throughout the 1990s and became a cornerstone of the Malaysian rock scene.

== Punk rock ==
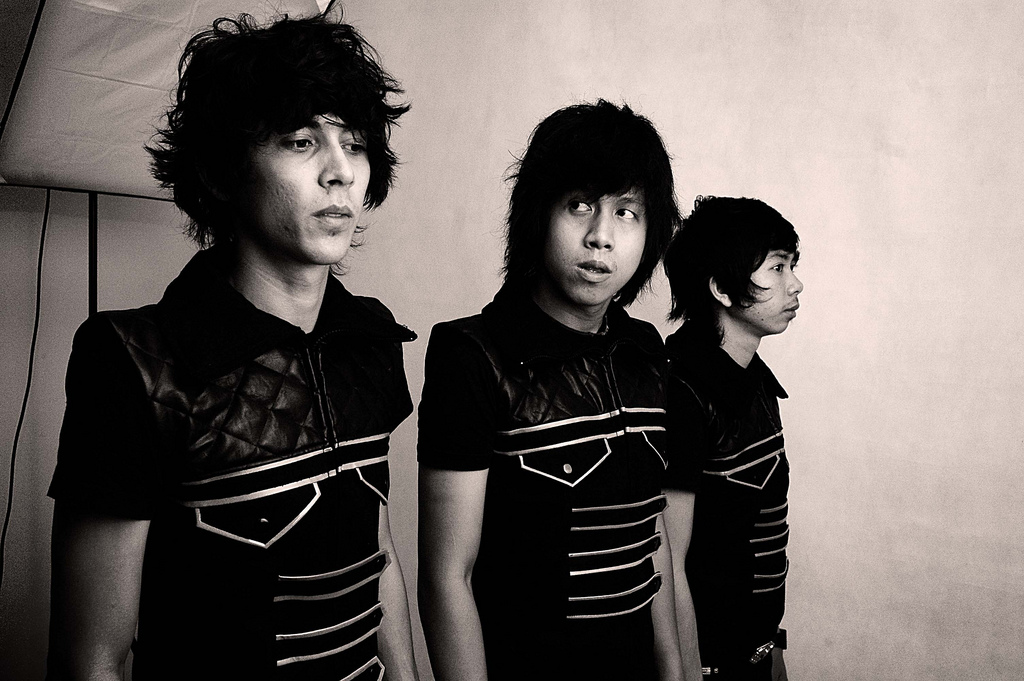
Members of Bunkface. From left to right: Sam, Youk, and Paan.

=== Late 1980s ===
The Malaysian punk rock scene began to take shape in the late 1980s, with bands like Mallaria making their mark. Mallaria, formed around 1986 in the city of Kuala Terengganu, released a four-song demo mix in 1987. The band's genre has been described as crossover thrash. While Mallaria never released an album under a major label, their drummer later went on to form the band The Stone Crows, and their guitarist participated in bands such as PROV, DPSA, and Zink. The early years were marked by a limited mainstream success but had a significant impact on the local punk scene.

=== Early 1990s ===
By the early 1990s, the underground punk rock scene was thriving in Kuala Lumpur. Bands such as The Pilgrims, Carburetor Dung, The Bollocks, Formation Bee, Stoink, The United Color of Frustration, Marlinspike, and Mechanical-Baby were part of the emerging scene. The Oi! and streetpunk movements gained popularity during this time, with bands like A.C.A.B., The Official, and Roots 'n' Boots adopting the styles of mods and skinhead subcultures. The early 1990s were a period of musical diversity, with punk rock blending with various other genres and cultural influences.

=== Mid 1990s to late 2000s ===
From the mid-1990s onwards, the Malaysian punk rock scene continued to grow. Events and showcases for punk music became more frequent. While many bands traditionally sang in English, a notable shift occurred as more bands began incorporating Bahasa Malaysia into their lyrics. Popular bands from this period include OAG, Butterfingers, MARIONEXXES, Estranged, Pop Shuvit, Bunkface, and Paku. These bands gained recognition not only in Malaysia but also in neighboring countries such as Indonesia, Singapore, and Japan, especially with their collaborations with international artists. Pop Shuvit, in particular, achieved remarkable success in Japan, with several successful headlining tours and a Top 20 album charting at Tower Records.

Another genre that emerged in this period was "sambarock," pioneered by Darkkey Nagaraja and his band The Keys. This genre combined hard rock with elements of folkloric Tamil music and a stage presence inspired by Michael Jackson. Other notable bands of this era included post-rock outfits like Damn Dirty Apes, progressive rockers Samarkand, and reggae combo Pure Vibracion.

== Hardcore / post-hardcore / metalcore / speed metal ==
Hardcore punk and its subgenres gained momentum in Malaysia in the early 2000s. Bands such as Devilica, Kias Fansuri, and Second Combat are notable for their contributions to the underground hardcore music scene. Metalcore also saw significant growth during this period, with bands like Forsaken, Foreground Division, Groundless Victim, Beyond Sight, Groundrule, Amarah, Dewata, Furion Escalada, Dominator, Tyrant, Dead Eyes Glow, Mad Monsters Attack, Restraint, and LoveMeButch bringing metalcore and post-hardcore sounds to the forefront of the local scene.

== Indie and post-rock ==
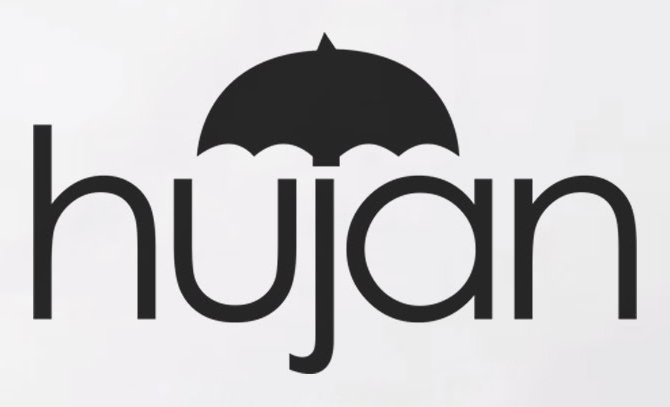
The logo of Hujan

The Malaysian rock scene is also home to a variety of rock subgenres such as indie rock and post-rock. Notable rock bands include Crossing Boundaries, Hujan, Moi Last Von, Meet Uncle Hussain, Grey Sky Morning, The Endleaves, Deepset, and Maxim Smirnov. These bands have contributed to the diverse soundscape of Malaysian rock, with many experimenting with post-rock and alternative rock styles.

== See also ==
- Music of Malaysia
