= Rock kapak =

Genre of rock music, mainly from Malaysia

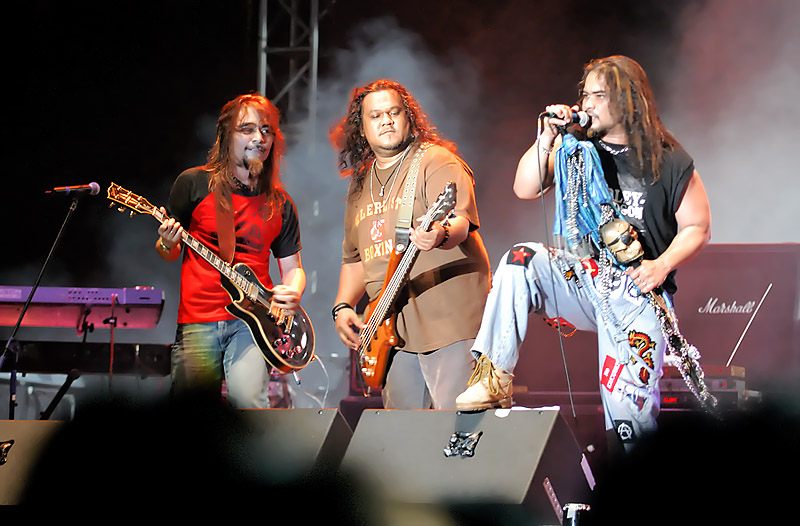
- Wings, one of the most prominent Malaysian rock kapak bands
- Etymology: From "kapak", literally "axe" or "hatchet", but likely a corruption of "car park" (where many early informal rock kapak concerts were held)
- Other names: Rock jiwang, Malay rock
- Stylistic origins: Rock; hard rock; heavy metal; glam rock; glam metal; pop metal; pop rock; arena rock; soft rock; slow rock; sentimental ballad
- Cultural origins: 1980s – early 1990s, Malaysia and Singapore

Regional scenes
- Singapore; Johor (Johor Bahru, Muar, Kluang and Segamat); Malacca (Malacca City); Negeri Sembilan (Seremban and Kuala Pilah); Klang Valley (Selangor and Kuala Lumpur); Perak (Kinta Valley); Penang; Pahang (Kuantan, Temerloh and Raub); Kelantan (Kota Bharu); Terengganu (Kuala Terengganu); Sarawak (Kuching)

Rock kapak is a sub-genre of Malay language rock music sung largely in Malaysia and Singapore with stylistic influences from glam metal, hard rock and heavy metal. Originating in the 1980s, it peaked in mainstream popularity in those countries in the early-to-mid 1990s.

== Etymology ==
The term kapak is considered to be a corruption of the English term car park coincidentally also bearing the meaning of "axe" in Malay: many early Malaysian rock bands would perform in car parks, readily available and affordable urban public spaces, sessions dubbed as "fun fairs" . The name rock kapak was thus adopted as a somewhat ironic term, distinguishing local, Malaysian rock artists from more established, "foreign" rock artists performing in stadiums.

A major subset of rock kapak music is labelled as jiwang meaning overtly or excessively sentimental i.e. "sappy" "soppy" or "schmaltzy"; the term gained popularity in tandem with elaborate, romantic rock kapak ballads that dominated Malaysian pop charts and popular culture throughout the 1990s.

== History ==
The earliest manifestation of rock music in the Malay Peninsula emerged in the early 1960s, particularly influenced by the electric-guitar-driven rock-and-roll sounds of the British Invasion artists such as Cliff Richard, The Beatles and The Rolling Stones. Known as pop yeh-yeh (after the Beatles' "She Loves You" refrain yeah-yeah-yeah); this largely Malay-language sub-genre uniquely incorporated the lilting, rhythmic vocal styles characteristic of Malay asli (folk or traditional) music alongside the driving, high-tempo styles of contemporary rock-and-roll. As a pre-eminent commercial centre with a well-established Malay-language entertainment industry, Singapore emerged at the leading edge for the development of pop yeh-yeh.

The prominence of pop yeh-yeh began to wane by the 1970s, as a combination of changing musical tastes (including the emergence of psychedelic rock and punk) and increasing restrictions on live rock performances by the Singaporean government led to its gradual decline. However, the legacies of the pop yeh-yeh era, including its localisation of contemporary rock music and fashion, as well as its strong emphasis on live concerts, would prove to be influential in establishing the acceptance, and growth, of rock kapak in the following decades.

Throughout the 1980s, the mainstream popularity of Malaysian rock kapak groups was significantly enhanced by high-profile television shows such as Muzik-Muzik, which highlighted new artists and songs; and Anugerah Juara Lagu, a music competition.

Rock kapak arguably reached its zenith in the late 1980s and early 1990s, with rock groups dominating local charts. Tacit government support for this local music phenomenon was combined with an increasing emphasis on rock kapak by the Malaysian music industry. With the local Chinese and Indian ethnic minorities largely preferring artists from Hong Kong/Taiwan and India respectively, and labels generally reticent to release English-language songs due to worries about how Malaysian-accented English would be received, Malay-language music became the overwhelming focus of the local industry.

This elevated the profile and popularity of rock kapak significantly, arguably allowing it to transcend ethnolinguistic boundaries despite it almost exclusively being sung in the Malay language. In 1989, it was estimated that of the approximately 15 albums released by local labels every month, 12 were rock kapak albums. This began an almost decade-long period of Malaysian chart dominance, with best-selling albums including Search's 1989 "killer album", Fenomena ("Phenomenon") (250,000 units), Ukays' 1992 album Bisa Berbisa ("May Be Poisonous") (350,000 units) and XPDC's 1997 album, Brutal (500,000 units).

Rock kapak also began to make headway in Indonesia, with its much larger population as well as a shared tradition of songwriting in literary Malay intelligible to both formal (post-colonial) Indonesian and Malaysian, making it a lucrative market for Malaysian bands. Search's Fenomena, for instance, logged cumulative sales of almost 2 million units there (nearly 10 times its sales in Malaysia), selling 50,000 albums every day at its peak.

Despite its chart dominance, rock kapak began to decline throughout the mid-to-late 1990s. Highly-publicised incidents of unrest at live concerts, culminating in a Battle of the Bands concert in 1989 where fans in attendance reportedly began throwing chairs and soft drink cans, would lead to periodic crackdowns led by Prime Minister Mahathir Mohamad. These included a ban on open-air rock concerts in 1986 and a ban on long-haired male rock artists from the public broadcaster Radio Televisyen Malaysia in 1990. Said broadcaster also made a rule limiting Malaysian acts only to broadcast its stations from 1989 to 1991, this still caused a lasting brain drain of Malay Singaporean rockers moving into Malaysia for better career opportunities, some even renouncing their Singaporean citizenships for new Malaysian ones in the process.

Constrained by a relatively small and conservative local recording industry, as well as increasing government scrutiny, rock kapak became largely restricted to slow jiwang ballads, which retained mainstream popularity well into the 1990s, but made it increasingly "predictable". Some young fans began to migrate to thrash metal, but as it attracted even more controversy and government scrutiny, it never gained the mainstream popularity that rock kapak did and largely remained an underground phenomenon.

== Characteristics ==
Rock kapak is musically characterised by slow-tempo power ballads, often featuring elaborate electric guitar solos and wide vocal range. It was primarily influenced by hard rock groups such as AC/DC, Led Zeppelin, Twisted Sister and Deep Purple. Scorpions, a German hard rock group, was noted as being particularly influential, with its more "melodic" style of rock strongly influencing many mainstream rock kapak groups. Influence was also drawn from traditional forms of Malay folk music, with its characteristic steady beat and lilting vocal style.

Rock kapak is almost exclusively sung in the Malay language, with lyrics generally focusing on romantic themes. This has been attributed to a combination of strict controls on freedom of expression by the conservative, authoritarian Malaysian government (mass media ownership at the time entirely connected to right-wing UMNO and associated parties), and rock kapak being a largely mainstream pop-driven phenomenon, both serving to effectively limit the themes covered by rock kapak bands. Many artists covering more subversive themes generally remained in the underground music scene, and/or largely sung their works in English to target a minority largely urbanised, liberal audience. As a result, they never gained significant broadcast airtime and were largely absent from mainstream popular culture.

== Fashion ==
While rock kapak tended to draw musically largely from hard rock, at the beginnings of its mainstream popularity, rock kapak artists often adopted androgynous styles influenced by glam metal and heavy metal bands such as Scorpions. These generally included long hair styled with the use of hairspray, makeup, and elaborate costuming often featuring tight leather and denim clothing. These were considered revolutionary in pushing cultural and gender norms, but were considered highly controversial at the time, often stigmatised as being associated with illicit drug use or general poor behaviour.

Despite the controversy, these styles proved influential in Malay popular culture throughout 1980s, particularly among a new generation of urbanising, young Malays, who had begun migrating to Kuala Lumpur as a result of Malaysia's relatively centralised industrialisation and economic development.

From the 1980s onwards, the "messy" style of rock kapak musicians led to them being somewhat pejoratively labelled kutu ("lice"), which then became a label more generally applied to young, urban and largely working-class Malays – in particular, street kids who drew influence from rock artists' fashions. The term mat rock (literally "rock-man" or "rocker") was also used more commonly as a self-applied term among rock fans.

In the 1990s, a Malaysian government crackdown on the perceived "antisocial" aspects of rock kapak resulted in many mainstream artists retreating from these styles. Most infamously, long-haired performers were banned from the then-Government monopoly broadcaster, Radio Televisyen Malaysia, by Information Minister Mohamad Rahmat in 1992. The two most high-profile holdouts, Awie (of the band Wings) and Amy (of Search) eventually agreed to have their hair cut by Mohamad himself live on breakfast programme Selamat Pagi Malaysia on 22 November 1992. This has been noted as being both a watershed moment for rock kapak's mainstream popularity, with its tacit government approval opening opportunities for more mainstream promotion, and the beginnings of its eventual decline, as it began to lose its "outsider", "rebellious" status.

== Notable artists ==
=== Bands ===
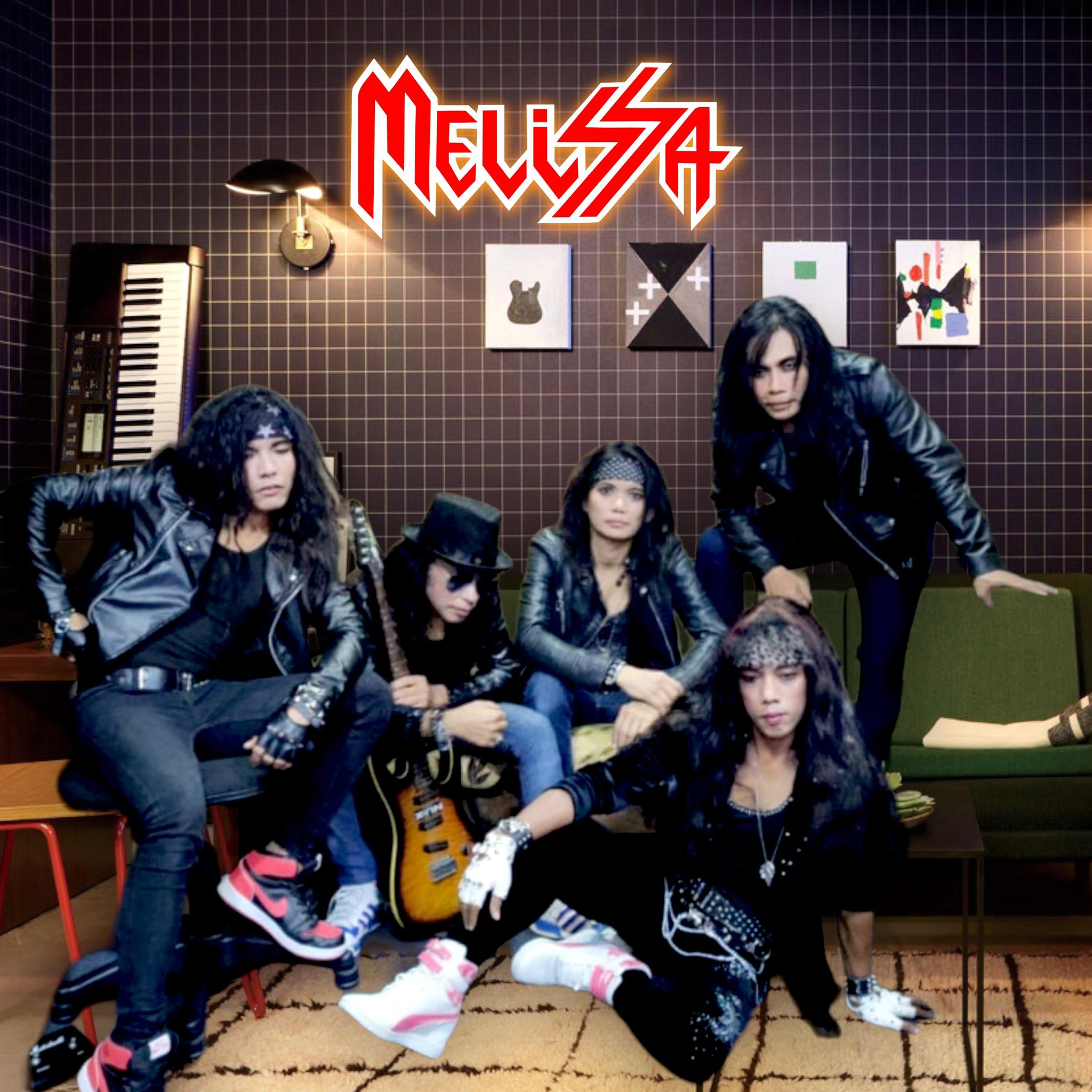
Current lineup of Melissa (band), a Pahang-based band

- Bumi Putra Rockers
- Crossfire (Malaysian band)
- Data (Malaysian band)
- Dinamik
- Ekamatra
- Exists
- Gersang
- Handy Black
- Helter Skelter (band)
- Iklim
- Lefthanded
- Laksamana (band)
- Lestari (band)
- Masa (band)
- May
- Medicine (Malaysian band)
- Meditasi
- Mega (band)
- Melissa (band)
- Olan (band)
- Rusty Blade
- Samudera (band)
- Search
- Slam
- Sofea (band)
- Spring (Malaysian band)
- Sweet Charity (band)
- Stings (band)
- Terra Rossa (band)
- Ukays
- Wings (Malaysian band)
- XPDC

=== Solo artists ===
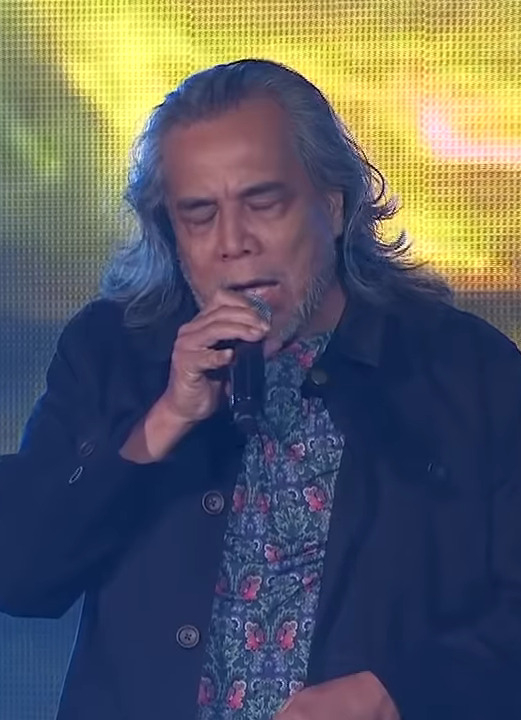
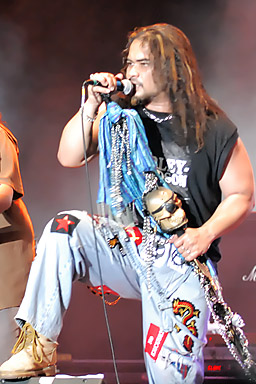
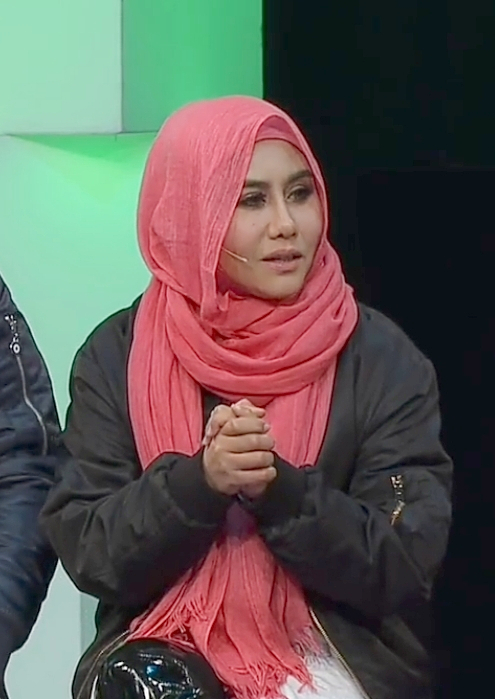
Ramli Sarip (left), Awie (middle) and Ella (right)
- Amy (b. 1958)
- Awie (b. 1968)
- Ella (b. 1966)
- Deddy Dores (1950–2016, from Indonesia)
- Hattan (b. 1964)
- Inka Christie (b. 1973, from Indonesia)
- Mamat (b. 1978)
- Nike Ardilla (1975–1995, from Indonesia)
- Poppy Mercury (1972–1995, from Indonesia)
- Ramli Sarip (b. 1952, from Singapore)
- Saleem (singer) (1961–2018)

== In popular culture ==
The rock kapak scene was popularized by the Malaysian musical comedy film series Rock (film series), created by Mamat Khalid.
