= XPDC =

Malaysian rock kapak band

- Also known as: Tragedy (1985–1988)
- Origin: Kuala Lumpur, Malaysia
- Genres: Rock kapak; heavy metal; thrash metal; hard rock
- Years active: 1988–present
- Labels: Life Records (Malaysia); Musica Studios (Indonesia)
- Members: Ali; Izo; Lola; Eddie; Arif
- Past members: Mael; Yazid; Man Tobey; Zuar; Lee Space; Amy; Yan Toi; Pae
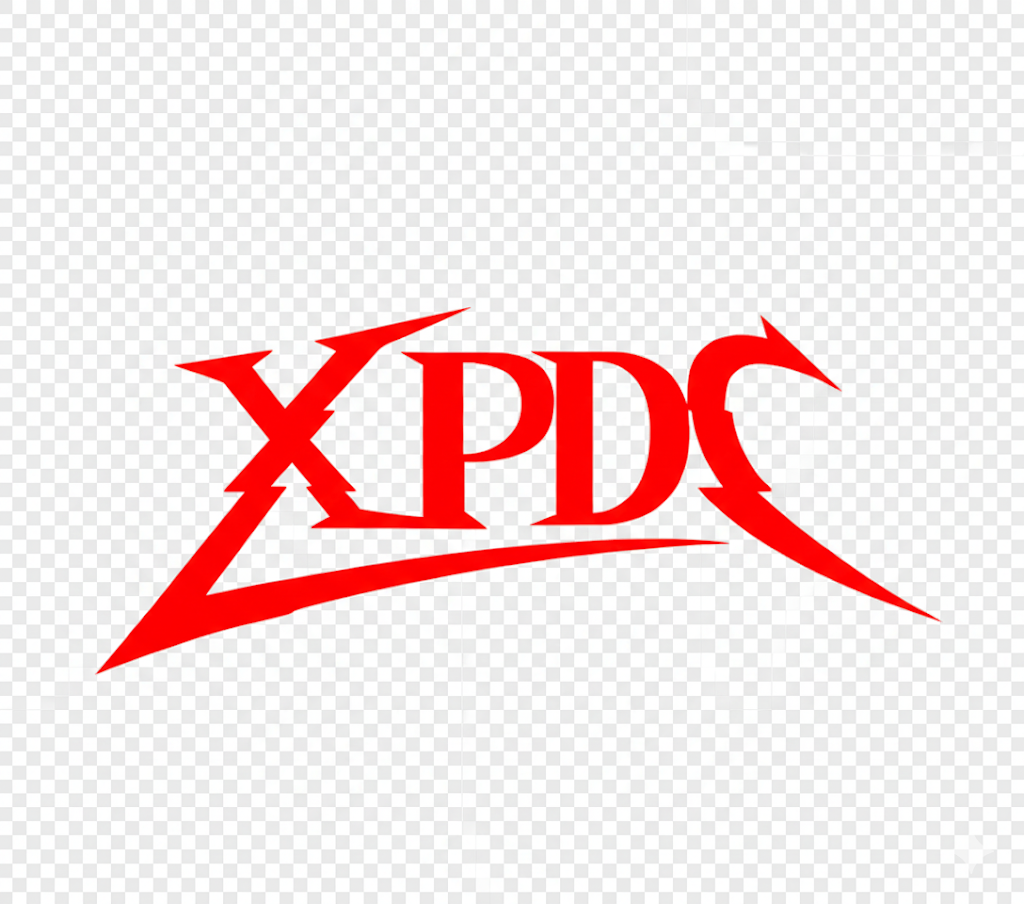

XPDC is a Malaysian rock kapak band that originated in 1983 as Tragedy, formed in Kuala Lumpur by vocalist Syed "Mael" Ismail bin Syed Ibrahim, guitarist Mohd "Izo" Zulkifly bin Nik Hussin, bassist Man Tobey, and drummer Yazid. In 1988, they changed their name to XPDC at the behest of their longtime producer, JS Kevin, and Man Tobey and Yazid left shortly after. They were replaced by Azuar bin Tasi (Zuar) and Lee Space, respectively.

The group signed a contract with Life Records and released their debut album, Darjah Satu, in 1990. Lee Space departed shortly after and was replaced by Amy (Handy Black). The band's second album, Timur Barat, came out in 1992 and was followed by Kita Peng-Yu (1994) and Brutal (1997). That year, Mael left the group, and Mohd Ali bin Ismail (Ali), formerly of Terra Rossa, took his place. Saiful "Lola" Rizla bin Kamaruddin replaced Amy on drums in 1997, and a year later, the band released their first live album, titled Konsert Raksasa XPDC Brutal, Stadium Negara. Their next studio recording, Samurai, came out the same year. In 2000, longtime bassist Zuar left the band and was replaced by Yan Toi. XPDC released the album V6 in 2002. It was their last collaboration with producer JS Kevin, before his death in August. Lola left in 2003, swapping places with Search drummer Pae Sembah Bumi (Pae).

In 2005, XPDC issued the compilation Medley Rugged and subsequently held a reunion concert with some of its original members, including Izo, Mael, Zuar, and Amy, after which they went on hiatus. Ali and Pae formed the group Mpire, and Yan Toi joined Lefthanded. In 2007, XPDC released the compilation album Rock Union, and in 2009, they returned, still in the lineup of Izo, Mael, Zuar, and Amy, and issued a new record, titled Rasopariso.

In 2014, XPDC released the compilation XPDC Hits 25 Tahun, and a year later, Mael left the band once more. In 2018, with a lineup consisting of the returning Ali and Lola, Izo (the band's only remaining original member), and new bassist Eddie, XPDC issued their eighth, and to date latest album, Doa.

In the 2020s, Ali began experiencing heart problems, and the band hired Mamu to replace him onstage until his recovery.

== Band members ==
=== Current ===
- Mohd Zulkifly bin Nik Hussin (Izo) – lead guitar (1983–present)
- Mohd Ali bin Ismail (Ali) – vocals (1997–2005, 2015–present)
- Saiful Rizla bin Kamaruddin (Lola) – drums (1997–2005, 2015–present)
- Eddie – bass (2015–present)
- Nik Mohd Arif bin Mohd Zulkifly (Arif) – rhythm guitar (2024–present)
- Mamu – session vocalist (2024–present)

=== Past ===
- Man Tobey – bass (1983–1988)
- Yazid – drums (1983–1988)
- Azuar bin Tasi (Zuar) – bass (1989–2000)
- Lee Space – drums (1989–1990)
- Syed Ismail bin Syed Ibrahim (Mael) – vocals (1989–1997, 2005–2024)
- Amy – drums (1991–1997)
- Yan Toi – bass (2000–2005)
- Pae – drums (2003–2005)

== Discography ==
=== Studio albums ===
- Darjah Satu (1990)
- Timur Barat (1992)
- Kita Peng-Yu (1994)
- Brutal (1997)
- Samurai (1998)
- V6 (2002)
- Rasopariso (2009)
- Rasopariso: The Relaunch (2010)
- Doa (2018)

=== Live albums ===
- Konsert Raksasa XPDC Brutal, Stadium Negara (1998)
- Rockarena (2006)

=== Compilations ===
- XPDC & Rakan-Rakan Unplugged (1995)
- Rock Ballad (1996)
- Seleksi Headbang (1996)
- Double Headbang – XPDC vs Rusty Blade (2000)
- Real N' Reality (2000)
- Perang Ballad – XPDC vs Rusty Blade (2001)
- Titian Perjalanan (2001)
- Lagu Dari Aku – Mael & XPDC (2004)
- Headbang (2005)
- Medley Rugged (2005)
- Semangat Merdeka 8.31 (2007)
- Rock Union (2007)
- Real N' Reality, Vol. 2 (2011)
- XPDC Hits 25 Tahun (2014)

=== Other albums ===
- Metal 60'an (covers, 1997)
- Metal 50' 60'an (covers, 1998)
- Un'metal (acoustic/orchestral, 2000)
- Un'metal II (acoustic/orchestral, 2003)
- Un'metal III (acoustic/orchestral, 2013)

=== Video albums ===
- Brutal Live in Concert (1998)
- XPDC Vol.3 Entah Apa-Apa Entah (2000)
- Metal 50' 60'an (2001)
- Kronologi XPDC (2001)
- V6 (2002)
- XPDC Live in Concert (2003)
- Konsert Medley Rugged Live in Planet Hollywood (2006)
