= Amy Search =

Malaysian singer-songwriter (born 1958)

Yang Berbahagia Datuk Amy Search DPSM Melaka
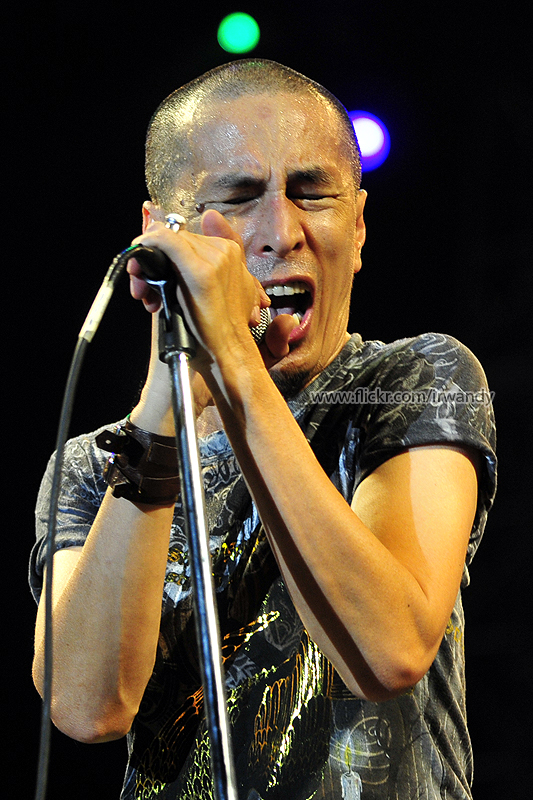
- Born: Suhaimi bin Abdul Rahman; July 28, 1958 (age 68); Kampung Bakar Batu, Johor Bahru, Johor, Persekutuan Tanah Melayu (now Malaysia)
- Other name: Amy
- Occupations: Singer, songwriter, musician, actor
- Years active: 1973–present
- Title: Malaysia's King of Rock
- Spouses: Faridah Fadzil (m. 1983; div. 1985) Norliza Abdul Latiff (m. 1990; div. 1994) Roslisa Ahmad (m. 1995; div. 2000) Datin Norhasliza Hassan (m. 2003)
- Children: 5 including Nabila Huda Suhaimi
- Musical career
- Genres: Rock, Hard rock, Heavy metal, Glam metal
- Instruments: Vocals, guitar
- Labels: BMG Music; Art-Is-At-Work; Neo Gendang; Musica Studio's
- Member of: Search

Suhaimi bin Abdul Rahman (born 28 July 1958), also known as Amy Search, is a Malaysian singer-songwriter, musician, and actor. He is best known as the lead vocalist and founder of the rock band Search. Search has released more than 20 best-selling studio albums, dozens of best-selling songs and singles, and performed dozens of sold-out concerts. He is also an actor, with credits including Kembara Seniman Jalanan (1986) and Fenomena (1990).

== Career ==
Amy initially worked as a piano tuner before becoming the lead singer and guitarist for the band The Detours Brothers between 1971 and 1973. In 1973, he became the lead singer and rhythm guitarist of Soft White Eyes with Umarul Mahdzar, who was the lead guitarist of iklim, Dian P. Ramlee (bass guitar), and Yantzen (drums). This group changed its name to Titanic in 1979, was disbanded in 1981, and revived in 1983.

Search invited Nasir and Din to join the band Flash, before changing their band's name to Search. Search became the lead singer and tambourine player and operated as the group leader and founder. Din was the rhythm guitarist, and Nasir Daud was the bass guitarist, before he withdrew and continued his career as a solo singer.

In 1996 Amy decided to leave the Search group and released his second solo album, Camouflage, having also previously recorded his first solo album, titled Magic. This disappointed many of their fans, as Search had been around for a decade and was among the longest-lasting rock groups in Malaysia.

After several years of working solo, Amy and Search decided to reunite. In 2008, Amy got the attention of the Indonesian media by expressing his displeasure over the tendency of Malaysian radio stations to prioritize Indonesian songs.

On March 30, 2020, he announced his resignation as Search's vocalist for the second time, citing vocal quality as the main reason. He reportedly will not be involved in any of Search's concerts in the future.

== Acting career ==
Amy began his acting career in 1986, in the film Kembara Seniman Jalanan, directed by Nasir Jani.

In 2010, Amy starred in the musical performance Suatu Masa: Amy, at Istana Budaya from March 26 to 28. The musical, organised by the Mentari Channel Network, was accompanied by the National Symphony Orchestra.

== Personal life ==
Amy Search has been married four times. He has five children, including Nabila Huda (b. 1984).

He has spoken about his interest in coffee and teh tarik, and has launched his own tea brand called Phewiiit!, in 2017

== Discography ==
=== Album ===
Solo ALBUM

- Magic (1994)
- Camouflage (1997)
- Aku (1999)
- Suatu Masa (2000)
- IKON – A Rockstar Chronicle (2006)

ALBUM SEARCH

- Cinta Buatan Malaysia (1985)
- Langit dan Bumi (1986)
- Mentari Merah Di Ufuk Timur (1987)
- Di Pintu Sepi (1988)
- Berpaling (1988)
- Fenomena (1989)
- Search Live (1989)
- Karisma (1990)
- Sepuluh Tahun (1991)
- Rampage (1992)
- Double Trouble, bersama Wings (1992)
- Terbaik (1994)
- Gema di Timur Jauh (1995)
- Gema Di Timur Jauh "Unplugged" (1995)
- Rock 'N' Roll Pie (1996)
- Rock N' Roll Pie Live N' Loud (1997)
- Double Trouble 2, bersama Wings (1998)
- Rockestra (2001)
- Gothik Malam Edan (2006)
- Konsert Rock Search Evolusi 2004 (2007)
- Live at Planet Hollywood (2007)
- Double Trouble Concert SEARCH & WINGS (2010)
- Katharsis (2017)

SINGLE

- Cinta Kita (1991– duet with Inka Christie)
- Nafas Cinta (1991– duet with Inka Christie)
- Isabella '98 (1998 Duet Amy, Jamal Abdillah, Saleem & Zamani Ibrahim)
- Jangan Pisahkan (2003 duet with Inka Christie)
- Sesat Di Kuala Lumpur (2006 Duet Amy Search & Saleem Iklim)
- Petanda (2010– duet with Karl Cromok)
- Songo (2008)
- Di Buku Ini (2003 duet with Inka Christie)
- Akulah Pejuang (2010 OST Impak Maksima)
- Isabella (2010 duet Joe Flizzow)
- Kita Tetap Menang (2010 duet bersama Joe Flizzow untuk Johor Darul Takzim FC)
- Simetri (2011-duet with Hazama)
- Rentak Laguku (2014– duet with Bunkface)
- Redha Kemenangan (2015-duet with Edrie Hashim for OST BRAVO 5)

== Filmography ==
=== Film ===
Year	Title	Role	Remark
1986	Kembara Seniman Jalanan	Self	First film, guest actor
1987	Rozana Cinta 87		guest actor
1987	Sayang	Rizal	
1987	Kepala Angin		Back singer
1990	Fenomena	Suhaimi	
1990	Isabella	Amy	Filem usahasama Malaysia – Indonesia
2005	Rock	Juri 1	Special appearance
2010	Lu Pikirlah Sendiri de Movie	Driver Lori Ayam	Special appearance
2024	TAN-TI-ANA	Self	Special appearance
2026	5 Bomoh	Bomoh Alami	guest actor

=== Telefilm ===
Year	Title	Role	TV Channel
2017	Asam Pedas Pewitt	Amy	TV3

== In popular culture ==
Amy Search was immortalized in the form of a cartoon drawn by Lat in Lat's comic, Lat as Usual, published in 1990 by Berita Publishing,.

== Awards and nominations ==
- Best Vocal Performance in an Album, album Magic, 2nd Music Industry Awards (1995)
- Best Rock Album, producer Amy, album Camouflage, 5th Music Industry Awards (1998)
- Best Rock Album, producer Amy & M. Nasir, album Aku, 7th Music Industry Awards (2000)
- Best Vocal Performance in an Album, album Suatu Masa, 8th Music Industry Awards (2001)
- Best Performance Winner, song Isabella, Song Champion Award TV3 (1989)
- Platinum Disc Award Triple, album Karisma sold over 170,000 units in Malaysia (1991)
- Best Album, producer Search, album Gema Di Timur Jauh "Unplugged", 3rd Music Industry Awards (1996)
- Best Rock Album, producer Search, album Gema Di Timur Jauh, 3rd Music Industry Awards (1996)

=== Orders of Merit ===
- Melaka
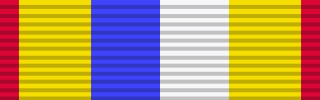
  - Darjah Pangkuan Seri Melaka (D.P.S.M.) – Datuk (2022)
