= Kembara Seniman Jalanan =

- Theatrical release poster
- Directed by: Nasir Jani
- Written by: M. Nasir
- Screenplay by: M. Nasir
- Produced by: Zarul Albakri
- Starring: M. Nasir; Pyan Habib; Khatijah Ibrahim; Majed Salleh; Imuda; Ramli Sarip
- Cinematography: Zainal Othman; Syed Mohammad
- Edited by: Meor Hashim; Ruhana Ismail; Dino R.; Kim; Fandy; Nasir Jani
- Music by: M. Nasir
- Production company: ZSA Film Productions Sdn. Bhd.
- Release date: February 22, 1986 (Malaysia)
- Running time: 113 minutes
- Country: Malaysia
- Language: Malay
- Budget: RM 250,000
- Box office: RM 2 million

Kembara Seniman Jalanan (Note: The Malaysian-language title, in many difficult attempts to translate, has variously been translated in English as The Vagabond Singer, The Street Singer, The Travelling Artiste and The Wanderings of a Busker. This article uses Malay title for consistency.) is a 1986 Malaysian musical adventure film directed by Nasir Jani. Starring M. Nasir, who also wrote the screenplay, it tells a story of a kampung boy named Bujang who has come to Kuala Lumpur to fulfilled his dream to become a singer. Unfortunately, he met Johan, a conman who owns a recording studio and tells him that he is not successful enough. The film co-stars Khatijah Ibrahim, Pyan Habib, Majed Salleh, Imuda and Ramli Sarip.

Produced with a budget of RM 250,000, Kembara Seniman Jalanan was released on 22 February 1986 to popular success. Critical reception was positive. It has since gained a cult following and has been noted for its criticism of the government's oppression towards rock musicians and the piracy activities.

== Plot ==
Bujang is a kampung boy who arrives in Kuala Lumpur to fulfil his dreams of becoming a singer. He accidentally met Osman Tikus, who earns a living as a pickpocket at the Puduraya Stop. His encounter with Osman resulted in his wallet also stolen by the latter. They would later become best friends. Bujang meets a conman named Johan, an owner of a recording studio in town who tells him that he is not successful enough to be a singer. Without his knowledge, Johan gives Bujang's song to the company's artiste Fariz to sing.

== Cast ==
- M. Nasir as Bujang/Jebat
- Khadijah Ibrahim as Ana
- Majed Salleh as Johan
- Pyan Habib as Osman Tikus

Other cast members include dR. Sam as Sam and the owner of Halal Records, Shah Rezza as Fareez, Imuda as Brader Joe, Siso Kopratasa as Brader Joe's burger stall staff, Maureen Foo as Izuna and Zabariah Hitam as the mad women. M. Rajoli and Hasnah Ibrahim appears in flashbacks as Bujang's parents. Ramli Sarip, Search and Blues Gang appears as themselves. Amran Nasrudin and Zahim Albakri appears as the reporters.

== Production ==
Kembara Seniman Jalanan was a directorial debut of Nasir Jani, based on an original screenplay written by M. Nasir, who also served as the music score composer. Nasir wrote the screenplay in 1982 and was revised for seven months, after which he submitted the script to Nasir Jani and Zarul. The film was produced by Zarul Albakri (older brother of Zahim Albakri), best known for his 1984 film, Matinya Seorang Patriot (Death of a Patriot; directed by Rahim Razali), through his company, ZSA Film Productions.

For the film, Nasir highlighted music piracy issues, which he described as "serious problem that the Government and the people should help to eradicate". ZSA Film Productions spent RM200,000 of budget to produce the film though they realise that the amount does not help them much for the film. The National Film Development Corporation Malaysia (FINAS), a government film regulatory body, was responsible in providing the film equipments. Nasir Jani, a Malacca-born director who is a MARA Technological Institute (ITM) graduate, returned to Malaysia after studying cinematography in London, England and accept the offer from the producers to direct the film. He also served as the art director and one of the editors.

M. Nasir, a Singaporean singer-singwriter who is based in Malaysia, was cast as Bujang, an aspiring musician. Singer, Khadijah Ibrahim was cast as Ana, an entertainment journalist. Khadijah agree to cast in the film, though she doesn't take up on the offer after coming close to doing so. Kembara Seniman Jalanan was Nasir's and Khadijah's first leading role. Several supporting roles were taken by dR. Sam, a former Malaysian reggae singer best known for his patriotical anthem "Saya Anak Malaysia" ("I'm a Malaysian Native"), who took his role as himself who owns a record label called Halal Records. Maureen Foo, a performing arts student from Universiti Sains Malaysia (USM) best known for her theatre acting credits, was also cast in the film, where she took her role as Izuna. She was credited under the name Neeruam, which was spelled backwards from her real name, in the opening credits. Further roles were also taken by established actors such as M. Rajoli and Zain Yahya though they had a limited screentime.

Principal photography took place in Kuala Lumpur, especially in Puduraya Stop and at the compound of Bank Negara Malaysia (BNM), in late April 1985. Cinematography was handled by Zainal Othman and Syed Mohammad, with editing by Meor Hashim, Ruhana Ismail and Nasir Jani himself. Kembara, a band which M. Nasir was one of its founding member, have a special appearances besides other established rock bands like Search, Blues Gang and Sweet Charity. The production team also hires few theatre groups including Grup Teater Elit.

== Themes ==
According to Nasir Jani, Kembara Seniman Jalanan contains criticism of certain issues in contemporary Malaysia, such as piracy and corruption. In his column written for Sinar Harian, Nasir asserted that the film invokes aspects of pop culture influences, which has been a trendy amongst Malaysian teens during the 1980s. An editor from the Muslim Youth Movement of Malaysia (ABIM) notes while messages in Kembara Seniman Jalanan is full of "sharp and harsh" criticism, the film itself highlights criticism sides towards the government's oppression against the rock musicians. While being depicted as a cult film with a "higher impression", the editor also wrote that the film's storyline satirised those who involved in piracy activities.

== Release and reception ==
Originally scheduled to be released on 21 February 1986, the film was officially released a day later after several weeks of delays following difficulties to booking a cinema. It was well-received and grossed RM2 million. However, the film did not received any awards following its disqualification from the 6th Malaysian Film Festival, because the producers had not fulfilled some of the festival's rules and criteria, aside from main cast member M. Nasir being a Singaporean. It was one of four Malaysian films selected for screening as part of the 'Four Films from Malaysia' exhibition at the British Film Institute in London, England in November 1988.

Reviewing for the New Straits Times, Kamil Othman described Kembara Seniman Jalanan as a "something of a missed opportunity", with "its blemishcs less painful to take".

== Soundtracks ==
All tracks performed by Kembara except "Balada Pemuzik Jalanan", performed by Search. All tracks composed by M. Nasir except "Balada Pemuzik Jalanan", composed by Zainol Ali.

No.	Title	Writer(s)	Performer(s)	Length
1.	"Rupa Tanpa Wajah"			5:11
2.	"Siapa Orang Kita"			5:38
3.	"Balada Pemuzik Jalanan"	Zainol Ali, S. Amin Shahab	Search	4:48
4.	"Duit!"			4:22
5.	"Sesat di Kuala Lumpur"			4:17
6.	"Dimanakah Dikau"			6:31
7.	"Cetak Rompak"			4:25
8.	"Balada Osman Tikus"			4:22
9.	"Harapan Terakhir"			5:18
10.	"Rupa Tanpa Wajah" (instrumental)			5:05
Total length:				53:36
