= Mamat Exist =

Malaysian singer (born 1978)

- Born: Mohd Ali bin Kamarudin; April 23, 1978 (age 48); Tampoi, Johor Bahru, Johor, Malaysia
- Occupation: Singer
- Years active: 1991–present
- Spouse: Marshila Mustapha Kamal (m. 2001; div. 2009)
- Children: 3
- Parents: Kamarudin Samad (father); Jawiyah Hamid (mother)
- Musical career
- Genres: Pop rock; Hard rock; Pop
- Labels: Jojo's Production (1991–1996); FMC Music (2003–2006)
- Member of: Exists

Mohd Ali bin Kamarudin, professionally known as Mamat Exist, is a Malaysian singer. Formerly a vocalist in the rock band Exist (now Exists), Mamat began holding solo performances in 1995. He is known for producing the songs: Langkah Seiringan, Ibu, Di Sebalik Pohon Cemara, Salju Di Danau Rindu and Hanya Engkau Kekasih. In 2019, he made a comeback in industry as Exists announced their reunion with him and other former members.

== Career ==
Kamarudin initiated his music career with Malaysian pop rock band Exists (formerly Exist). He was the first teenage rock vocalist before another artist Ezad Lazim joined in 1995. Kamarudin recorded 2 studio albums, Exist (1991) and Anugerah (1993) as well as a compilation album, Dulu dan Sekarang (1994), with the band between May and June 1991. In 1995, Kamarudin left Exist and started recording solo albums, such as Mamat (produced by Mat Penang).

== Gegar Vaganza 2014 ==
During the first season of Gegar Vaganza in 2014, Kamarudin ranked third place and was given a RM15,000 cash prize. He was also awarded the Audience Choice Best Performance and received an additional prize of RM5,000.

Performances and Results (Gegar Vaganza 2014)
Concert	Theme	Song Task	Original soundtrack	Position	Result
Week 1	Throwback	"Rahsia Pohon Cemara"	Exists	Ke-12	SAFE
Week 2	Memori Berkasih	"Kamelia"	Sweet Charity	Ke-7	SAFE
Week 3	Kenangan Mengusik Jiwa	"Teguh"	Amy Search	Ke-5	SAFE
Week 4	Ada Berani?	"Ibu"	Exists	Ke-8	SAFE
Week 5	Impian dan Dedikasi	"Kau Ilhamku"	Man Bai	Ke-3	SAFE
Week 6	Berdua Lebih Baik	"Sandarkan Pada Kenangan" (duet bersama Ikka Razman)	Jamal Abdillah & Siti Sarah	Ke-2	SAFE
Week 7	Carta Lagu Hits	"Dealova"	Once Mekel	Ke-4	SAFE
Week 8	Akhir	Medley: "Salju Di Danau Rindu" dan "Janji Padamu" Battle (Hip Hop): "HAVOC" (bersama Fazli Zainal)	Himself and Exists Joe Flizzow, Altimet & SonaOne	NO. 5 NO.2	3RD

== Discography ==
=== Studio Albums (with Exists) ===
- Exists (1991)
- Anugerah (1993)
- Dulu dan Sekarang(1994)

=== Solo studio albums ===
- Mamat (1995)
- Pasrah (1996)
- Seminit Bagiku (2004)

=== Compilation albums ===
- Dulu...Sekarang (2003)
- Naluri Kasih (2006)

== Personal life ==
Mamat Exists was convicted of drug use in 2019. He appealed his conviction, and entered rehabilitation in 2024.
