= Sweet Charity (band) =

Singaporean rock band

- Origin: Singapore
- Genres: Rock n roll; rock kapak; hard rock; Heavy metal
- Years active: 1967–present
- Labels: Warner Music Malaysia; NSR New Southern Records (via ASP Antarctic Sound Production Sdn Bhd); Musica Studios (distributor in Indonesia)
- Members: Ramli Sarip; Roza Rasul; Din; Addy Cradle; Ahmad Jaafar
- Past members: Yantzen Juniwan; Sarwanie 'Wan' Ahmad; Razak Ahmad; Rosli Mohalim
- Logo
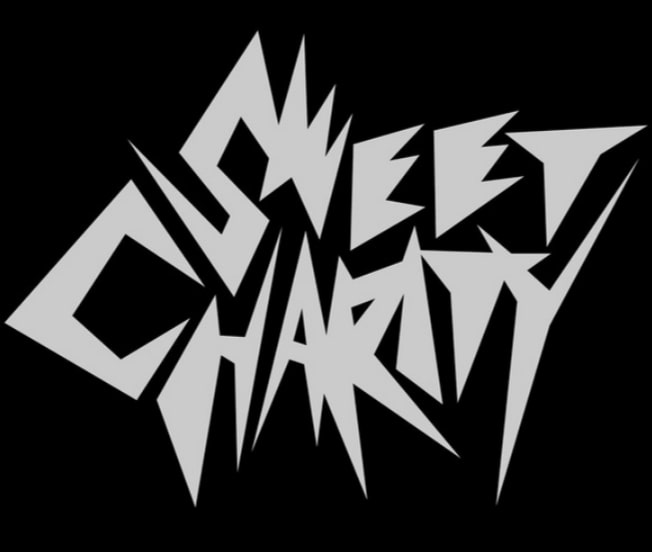

Sweet Charity are a Singaporean rock kapak band, formed in 1969. They are regarded as one of the pioneers of the rock kapak movement that was popular in the mid-1980s until mid-1990s in both countries.They also known as 'Deep Purple Singapore'.

== Career ==
Sweet Charity frequently held roadshows at various festivals throughout Singapore in the 70s and 80s. They were also responsible for popularizing rock music to the extent that they were dubbed as "Singapore's Deep Purple and Santana".

Many new-generation rock bands, such as Search, Lefthanded and others from the same era, covered their songs as foundational pieces before delving deeper into the country's rock music scene. Songs like "Kamelia", "Teratai", "Sejuta Wajah", and "Hilang Gelap Terbitlah Terang" had a profound impact on the burgeoning rock industry in the region at the time.

Sweet Charity gained fame across the archipelago through the song "Kamelia" (original song by Ebiet G. Ade), which was rearranged with a more energetic rhythm, accompanied by frontman Ramli Sarip's powerful vocals. They are also known for their nationwide roadshows in 1985 with the Blues Gang group, sponsored by the shoe manufacturer North Star.

== Members ==
=== Current lineup ===
- Ramli Sarip - vocals (1969–1986, 2000–present)
- Addy Cradle - guitar (2024–present)
- Din - bass (2024–present)
- Roza Rasul - keyboard (2024–present)
- Ridzuan Zalani - drums (2024–present)

=== Past members ===
- Rosli Mohalim - guitar (1969–2024)
- Yantzen Juniwan - vocals (1986–2000)
- Ahmad Jaafar - keyboard ( 1969-1980,1983-2025)
- Razak Ahmad - bass (1985–2024)
- Joe Salim - guitar (1969–1975)
- Wahid Warren - bass (1969–1979)
- Rahman Sarbani - drums (1969–1985)
- Yong- keyboard (1970–1979)
- Syed Hassan Al- Attas - bass (1979-1985; deceased)
- Sarwanie "Wan" Ahmad - guitar (1983–1987)
- Man Parey - drums (1985–1987; died)
- A. Ali - guitar (1975–1979)

== Discography ==
=== Studio albums ===
Year	Title
1979	Sweet Charity ̆Format ː Vinyl, LP Producer ː A. Husaini Publisher ː WEA
1980	Pelarian Format ː Vinyl, LP Producer ː A. Husaini Publisher ː WEA
1981	Sejuta Wajah Format ː Vinyl , LP Producer ː A. Husaini Publisher ː WEA
1982	Penunggu Format ː Vinyl, LP Producer ː A. Husaini Publisher ː WEA
1983	Batu Format ː Cassette Producer ː A. Husaini Publisher ː WEA
1985	Berita Gempa Format ː Cassette Producer ː A. Husaini Publisher ː WEA
1988	88' Format ː Cassette Publisher ː ASP
