= Barbarik (band) =

Malaysian rock kapak band

- Origin: Kuala Lumpur, Malaysia
- Genres: Hard rock, Blues rock , heavy metal, glam metal, pop metal
- Years active: 2022 – present
- Label: Pentas Barbarik Sdn Bhd (2024 - present)
- Members: Muss - Vocal; Abdul Zamin bin Abdul Kadir/JoBranko- Lead guitar Ainoll - Drum; Rozaimie - Bass
- Past members: Adi Yamin - Keyboard

Barbarik is a Malaysian rock kapak band formed in 2022 in Kuala Lumpur. This band consists of Muss (vocals), JoBranko (guitar), Ainoll (drums), and Rozaimie (bass). Barbarik word comes from Wings' ninth studio album in 2000.

== History ==
Initially, this group was formed for only 1 concert, which was the Barbarik concert on December 24, 2022, at Zepp Kuala Lumpur. The purpose of this concert was to cure the fans' longing to see the pairing between Joe Branko and Muss, who had been together with the group Wings from 1996 to 2000. They fulfilled their outstanding debt to the fans because Muss did not have time to sing a single song on the Mr. Barbarik album live with the group Wings because Muss left Wings shortly after the Mr. Barbarik album was released in 2000. Therefore, Jo Branko and Muss held a Barbarik concert on a loud stage in 2022. Due to the good response from the fans, Jo Branko and Muss agreed to continue this group with Ainol (drums), Rozaimi (bass) and Adi (keyboards).

== Members ==
Current members

- Mus - lead vocals (September 1, 2022 – present)
- Jo Branko - lead guitar (September 1, 2022 – present)
- Ainoll - drums (September 1, 2022 – present)
- Rozaimie - bass (September 1, 2022 – present)

Past members

- Adi Yamin - keyboard (2022–13 Ogos 2024)

== Album ==
Peluru Cokelat (2024)

== Concerts ==
- Barbarik Pentas Keras Concert organized by Anggerik Menawan (24 December 2022)
- Double Trouble 2 Concert organized by Alpha Nation (5 August 2023)
- Barbarik Pentas Keras Concert 2.0 (Singapore) organized by Offshore Entertainment Holdings (25 November 2023)
- Barbaik Peluru Cokelat Live Gig Concert @ Hard Rock Cafe organized by Pentas Barbarik Sdn Bhd (1 December 2024)
