= Spring (Malaysian band) =

Malaysian rock music group

- Also known as: Anthem (1987–1989)
- Origin: Seremban, Negeri Sembilan, Malaysia
- Genres: Rock kapak, heavy metal, hard rock, folk rock, pop rock
- Years active: (Anthem) 1987 - 1989 (Spring) 1991 - 2003, 2019 - now
- Labels: Sony Music, Sony BMG
- Members: Ameng; Zahar; Empy; Acong
- Past members: Amat; Kandar; Yunus; Ajis; Ayim; Fauzi Kamis
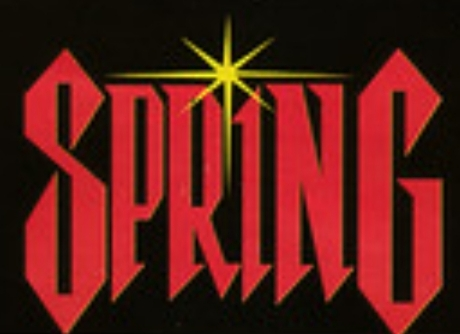

Spring (stylized as SPRING) is a Malaysian rock kapak band from Seremban, Negeri Sembilan.

They began to reach the peak of popularity when the single from their second album titled Sampai Hati was in the Malaysian music charts in 1993. After a 16-year hiatus since 2003, they regrouped in 2019.

== History ==
Spring was formed as Anthem in 1987 in Seremban, a trio consisting of Tengku Raden Iskandar bin Tengku Ismail (Kandar - guitar), (Zaha - guitar) and Ahmad Hafzan bin Abdullah (Amat - vocals). The bassist and drummer positions were later filled by members who alternated. They recorded a song in the compilation album War Rock III (1989). They signed a contract as the first Malaysian rock band to be under CBS Records, which was later known as Sony Music Malaysia in 1990. At that time, Mohd. Yunus Mokhtar (Yunus - bass) and Rozly Yahya (Acong - drums) had already joined the band. Before recording commenced, they were rebranded to its current name.

In 1991, Spring released their first self-titled album under Sony Music Malaysia. It sold only 25,000 units. They released their second album Spring 2.. Sampai Hati at the end of 1992, with the single "Sampai Hati". The song qualified for the final competition of Pujaan 10 by Nescafe and the 8th Anugerah Juara Lagu in the Ballad category. In 1994, the band released their third album, Bourgenvilla, with the songs "Bourgenvilla", "Butakah Cinta" and "Sepi Tanpa Cinta".

Spring's first compilation album, Pujaan Gemilang was released in 1995. Their singles "Cempaka Di Rembulan", "Romantis", "Persada Cintaku", "Kerana Budi Ku Jatuh Hati" and "Pesanan Buat Kekasih" were played on local radio stations. They later released the acoustic songs "Butakah Cinta", "Sejujur Mana Kata-Kata" and "Persada Cintaku". In the late 1990s they released the songs "Kita Di Takdirkan Jatuh Cinta", "Kerana Budi Ku Jatuh Hati" and "Pesanan Buat Kekasih". In 1997–1998, Acong left Spring for a while, and he was replaced by drummer Wan Roszi (Rozzi).

The group split up in 2004 following poor sales of their album Hati Mahu Baik. The band's vocalist Ameng was sentenced to eight years in prison for drug abuse on 12 April 2011, and beaten with ten strokes of a rattan cane. He was released from Kluang Prison in 2016. Since then, Ameng has continued his career as a solo singer.

In March 2018 the band held a one-off reunion at D'Saji Restaurant Titiwangsa in Kuala Lumpur.

On 7 January 2025 the vocalists Datuk Nash (of Lefthanded), Zamani Ibrahim (of Slam), Ameng (of Spring) and Jatt Ali were to perform in Singapore the following month.

Guitarist Tengku Raden Iskandar Tengku Ismail, also known as Kandar, died at his residence in Miri, Sarawak on 24 June 2025 at the age of 53.

== Members ==
- Tengku Raden Iskandar Tengku Ismail - guitar (Died 24 June 2025)
- Mohd Azhar bin Mohd Yusof (aka Zaha) - guitar
- Ahmad Hafzan bin Abdullah (aka Amat) - vocals
- Yunus Mokhtar - bass
- Rozly Yahya (aka Acong) - drums
