= Exists (band) =

Malaysian rock kapak band

- Also known as: Exist (until 1997)
- Origin: Johor Bahru, Malaysia
- Genre: Pop rock
- Years active: 1991–2008; 2016–present
- Labels: Jojo's Production; BMG; NAR Records; Warner; Ada Exists; Universal
- Members: Along; Musrad; Ujang; Ajai; Mamat; Ezad
- Past members: Shah; Joey

Exists is a Malaysian rock kapak band formed in Johor Bahru in 1991. They had success with their 1991 single "Untukmu Ibu".

== History ==
The group was formed under the name Exist in 1991 and consisted of vocalist Muhammad Ali "Mamat" Kamarudin, guitarists Azhrul "Along" Nasir and Shah Nizam Abdul "Shah" Halim, keyboardist Mohd Faizal "Ajai" Maas, bassist Musa "Musrad" Radhi, and drummer Saharudin "Ujang" Saniman.

They rose to fame with their 1991 single "Untukmu Ibu" and released their debut, self-titled album the same year. 1991 also marked the departure of Shah, who went on to join the group Slam. Exist issued their second studio album, Anugerah, in 1993. In 1994, Mamat left to pursue a solo career, and he was replaced by Mohd Rohaizad Mohd "Ezad" Lazim, with whom the band recorded their third album, Diammu Gunung Berapi, in 1995. After the release of Jangan Gentar in 1997, the band added an "s" to the end of their name, becoming Exists. The album Mutan came out in 1998, and Ada was released in 2001. Two more records followed: Seperti Dulu (2003) and Paragon (2004). In 2007, Ezad departed the group and was replaced by Zulkifli "Joey" bin Daud a year later. After the release of their 2008 compilation album Keunggulan, which included two new tracks sung by Joey, Exists went on an extended hiatus. They have been intermittently active since then. They reunited in 2016 for the Throwback Exists concert in Singapore, and in 2019, Ezad, Mamat, Ajai, and Shah performed at the Meletop Era Awards. On 26 July 2025, Slam and Exists performed to an audience of more than 5,000 at Malaysia's Mega Star Arena.

The band has released several albums for the Indonesian market, consisting of their songs re-recorded in Indonesian.

== Band members ==
Current

- Azhrul "Along" Nasir – guitar, backing vocals (1991–present)
- Musa "Musrad" Radhi – bass, backing vocals (1991–present)
- Saharudin "Ujang" Saniman – drums (1991–present)
- Mohd Faizal "Ajai" Maas – keyboards, backing vocals (1991–1998, 2019–present)
- Mohd Ali "Mamat" Kamarudin – vocals (1991–1994, 2019–present)
- Mohd Rohaizad Mohd "Ezad" Lazim – vocals (1995–2007, 2015–present)

Past

- Shah Nizam Abdul "Shah" Halim – guitar, backing vocals (1991–1992, 2019–2021)
- Zulkifli "Joey" bin Daud – vocals (2008–2014)

== Discography ==
Studio albums

- Exist (1991)
- Anugerah (1993)
- Diammu Gunung Berapi (1995)
- Jangan Gentar (1997)
- Mutan (1998)
- Ada (2001)
- Seperti Dulu (2003)
- Paragon (2004)

Indonesian albums

- Mencari Alasan (Diammu Gunung Berapi, 1996)
- Buih Jadi Permaidani (Jangan Gentar, 1998)
- Dirantai Digelangi Rindu (Mutan, 1999)
- The Best of Exists (2001)

Compilations

- Dulu Dan Sekarang (1994)
- Best of Exists (2000)
- Special Edition (Paragon, 2006)
- Hits Rakaman Semula (2007)
- Keunggulan (2008)
