= May (band) =

Malaysian heavy metal band

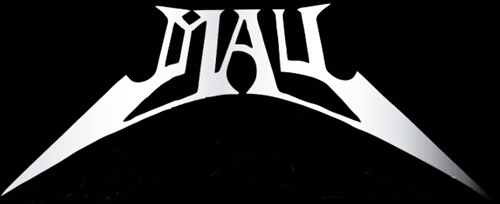
- Band logo

Background information
- Also known as: M.A.Y.
- Origin: Ipoh, Perak, Malaysia
- Genres: Heavy metal; glam metal; hard rock
- Years active: 1986–present
- Members: Abu; Yus
- Past members: Mus; Yantzen; Oney; Man; Wak Yus

May is a Malaysian heavy metal band formed in Ipoh in 1986. As of 2026, they have released ten studio albums, nine compilations, and one live record.

== History ==
=== Beginnings: 1986–1987 ===
May was formed in the Malaysian city of Ipoh in 1986 by drummer Mohd Saarip bin Yaakob (Man), guitarist Mohd Nassier bin Yusof (Abu), and bassist Mohd Mohtar bin Mohd Madin (Yus), whose initials provided the band's name. They were soon joined by vocalist Mustaffa "Mus" Din. The group began taking part in Battle of the Bands events in their home state and eventually on a national level, winning several contests. In 1987, two of their songs were included on a compilation album titled Juara-Juara Rock 1, featuring two songs each from four other bands—Burnmarks, D'Febians, Scandals, and Metalian. They subsequently contributed to Juara-Juara Rock 2 and Juara-Juara Rock 3, released the same year.

=== First four albums and breakup: 1987–1991 ===
May issued their debut studio album, Dilema, in 1987, which eventually achieved gold status. Their second album, Hakikat, came out in 1989 and achieved double-platinum status. The band's third record, Rahsia, followed in 1990 and also went double-platinum. Their fourth, Strategi, was released in 1991 and performed less well commercially, which led to the band breaking up shortly after.

=== Return and vocalist changes: 1992–1998 ===
In 1992, May regrouped without Mus, who had gone on to form the band Strangers, and with the addition of Rusty Blade vocalist Yantzen. In 1992, they released the album Ziet Geist, which saw the band regain their previous success, with the album selling over 100,000 units.

May's sixth record, Wira Cyborg, came out in 1994 and also sold over 100,000 units. A year later, the band issued their first compilation album, titled Layar, all of whose tracks were re-recorded, with Yantzen on vocals.

In 1996, May issued their seventh studio album, Ideologi, after which Yantzen departed the group. He was eventually replaced by Mohd Redzuan "Oney" Aziz, with whom the band recorded their next album, Penaklukan, in 1997. The same year, May released their second compilation, titled Keras, consisting of re-recorded tracks sung by Oney. Their next compilation, 3 Generasi, followed in 1998, and included a track sung by all the band's vocalists to date: Mus, Yantzen, and Oney.

=== Further work: 2003–present ===
After a five-year hiatus, in 2003, May released the album Sinar, with returning vocalist Mus. The record won the Best Hard Rock Album award at the 2004 Anugerah Industri Muzik (AIM) ceremony. A year later, the compilation Otai Jamm followed and also won Best Hard Rock Album at AIM. In 2005, the band released Live & Unplugged at Planet '25, which won the same award once more. The compilation Otai Jamm 2 followed in 2006, with Mus singing all tracks, even those previously recorded by Yantzen and Oney.

In 2008, May released the album Rock Klasik, consisting of covers of popular Malaysian and Singaporean rock songs. Once more, all three of the band's vocalists took part in the project. In 2011, they published their ninth compilation album, 25th Anniversary. The band's longtime drummer Man left in 2021 and was replaced by Wak Yus, who in turn departed in 2024.

== Band members ==
Current

- Mohd Nassier bin Yusof (Abu) – guitar (1986–present)
- Mohd Mohtar bin Mohd Madin (Yus) – bass (1986–present)

Past

- Mohd Saarip bin Yaakob (Man) – drums (1986–2021)
- Mustaffa "Mus" Din – vocals (1986–1991), (2002–2019)
- Yantzen Juniwan – vocals (1992–1996)
- Mohd Redzuan "Oney" Aziz – vocals (1997–2002)
- Wak Yus – drums (2021–2024)

== Discography ==
Studio albums

- Dilema (1987)
- Hakikat (1989)
- Rahsia (1990)
- Strategi (1991)
- Ziet Geist (1992)
- Wira Cyborg (1994)
- Ideologi (1996)
- Penaklukan (1997)
- Sinar (2003)
- Rock Klasik (2008)

Compilations

- Layar (1995)
- Keras (1997)
- 3 Generasi (1998)
- The Best of May (2002)
- Otai Jamm (2004)
- Otai Jamm 2 (2006)
- Ballad & Metal (2007)
- Terunggul 1986–2009 (2CD, 2009)
- 25th Anniversary (2011)

Live albums

- Live & Unplugged at Planet '25 (DVD, 2005)

Album appearances

- Juara-Juara Rock 1 (1987)
- Juara-Juara Rock 2 (1987)
- Juara-Juara Rock 3 (1987)
