= Ukays =

Malaysian pop rock band

- Also known as: Ukays (1986-1992) U.K's (1995-2001, 2009-2011, 2019 - recent), Uk's, Uks, Amir & Rakan-Rakan
- Origin: Ulu Kelang, Selangor
- Genres: Rock kapak, pop rock, ballad
- Years active: 1986–2001, 2009–present
- Labels: 1. Varia Music (Ukay) (1989); 2. Mekar Production (Ukays & U.K's) (1992-1997); 3. Kumbang Production (U.K's)(1997-1998); 4. BMG Music Malaysia (U.K's) (2000); 5.UKS Records (U.K's, Ukays, Ukay, Ukays Reborn) (2009 - recent)
- Members: U.K's (Reunion); 1. Amir (Vocal) (1992-2001, 2009 - recent); 2. Olley (Bass) (1994-1997, 2009-2011, 2019 - recent); 3. Daniel (Guitar) (1994-1997, 2009-2011, 2019 - recent); 4. Amirol (Drum) (1994-1997, 2009-2011, 2019 - recent); 5. Mus Satira (Guitar) (2022-recent) Ukays Reborn; 1. Said Tarmizi (Coot)(Vocal) (2022-recent); 2. Amy (Keyboardist / songwriter) (1994-1997, 2009 - 2011, 2016 - recent) Ukays 89; 1. Ali (Drum) (1986-1994, 2011-recent); 2. Well (Guitar) (1986-1994, 2011-2016, 2021 - recent); 3. Achik (Vocal) (2018 - recent); 4. Tok Jie (Bass) (2015 - recent); 5. Faiz(Guitar) (2015-recent)
- Past members: Zul (vocalist - Ukay) (1986-1991); Azmi Murad (Guitar) (1986-1993, 2011-2016); Din (bass)(deceased) (1986-1994, 2011-2014); Awie (Bass) (1997-2001); Niel (Guitar) (1997-2001); Joey (Drum) (1997-1998); Faizul (Guitar) (1998-2001); Akel (drummer) (deceased) (1998-2001)

Ukays, also known as U.K's, is a Malaysian pop rock band. The band was founded by Malaysian songwriter Saari Amri in 1986. The band rose to fame in 1994 with the release of their successful album Bisa Berbisa, which sold more than 400,000 units.

== History ==
The band was formed in 1986 and they released their first album Tinggal Irama in 1991. However, the album sold poorly and Ukays lost their label, Varia Music, after it unexpectedly closed. Amri and Ridhuan Abu Bakar opened their own label, Mekar Production. The band then changed their name from Ukay to Ukays. After the switch to a new label, Amir Ukays joined and became the band's lead singer. In 1992, the band released another unsuccessful album, Mencari.

In 1994, the fortunes of Ukays improved when they released Bisa Berbisa. The album became the highest selling Malaysian album of all time until the nasheed group Raihan surpassed it with their Puji-Pujian album in 1997. Bisa Berbisa received widespread radio play, particularly the songs "Seksa", "Kau Satu-Satunya", "Siapa Yang Rampas Cintamu" and"Di Sana Menanti Di Sini Menunggu". However, after a dispute over royalties, the majority of the band members (Well, Din and Ali) left the group, leaving only Amir Ukays and Amy Ukays. Drummer Amirol, bassist Olley and guitarist Daniel then joined the band. Ukays released their third album Tajam Menikam in 1995, selling 280,000 units. The album also sold well in Indonesia. After disappointing sales of their 1996 album l Cuma Aku Yang Hidup the members of Ukays left the label. Ukays then signed with Ambang Klasik and Rahmad Mega joined the group as their lead singer.

In 1997, Saari Amri published the band's fifth album Cuma Aku Yang Hidup. The album sold 100,000 units and was published by Kumbang Production. The band used BMG Music as a distributor. Cuma Aku Yang Hidup was not well received due to the economic crisis at that time and also the problem of music piracy. The most successful song from the album was "Kerana Pepatah Lukaku Berdarah".

== Legal troubles ==
Several members of the band have encountered legal problems. In 2015, Amir Ukays was charged with possession of an imitation pistol. Akel, who played the drums for the band's 2000 album Pijar Kasmaran, moved to Syria in 2013 after the start of the Syrian Civil War and joined Daesh. In 2019, Akel was accused of plotting to blow up locations in Johor Bahru. Later that year, he reportedly died in Syria due to a Russian airstrike In 1997, Amy, Daniel, Amirol & Olley left and, together with Rahmat Mega, formed a new band with the name Utama. This leaves only Amir as the sole member of Ukays and his hiatus in 2001. Later in 2009 band his reunion.

== Discography ==
=== Album studio ===
Year	Type	Name	Sales
1991	Tinggal Irama: Studio album; Released: 1989; Format: CD, cassette; label: Varia Music	Ukay	1000 units
1992	Mencari: Studio; Released: 17 February 1992; Format: CD, cassette; Label: Mekar Production	Ukays	Malaysia 15,000 units
1994	Bisa Berbisa: Studio album; Released: 26 April 1994; Format: CD, cassette; Label: Mekar Production	Ukays	Malaysia 400,000 units
1995	Tajam Menikam: Studio album; Released: 26 April 1995; Format: CD, cassette; Label: Mekar Production	U.K's	Malaysia 280,000 units; Indonesia Over 700,000 units
1996	Panas Berpanjangan: Studio album; Released: 1996; Format: CD, cassette; Label: Mekar Production	U.K's	Malaysia 175,000 units
1997	Cuma Aku Yang Hidup: Studio album; Released: 1997; Format: CD, cassette; Label: Kumbang Production	U.K's	Malaysia 100,000 units
2000	Pijar Kasmaran: Studio album; Released: 2000; Format: CD, cassette; Label: BMG Music Malaysia	U.K.'s	Indonesia 50,000 units
