= Wings (Malaysian band) =

Malaysian rock kapak band

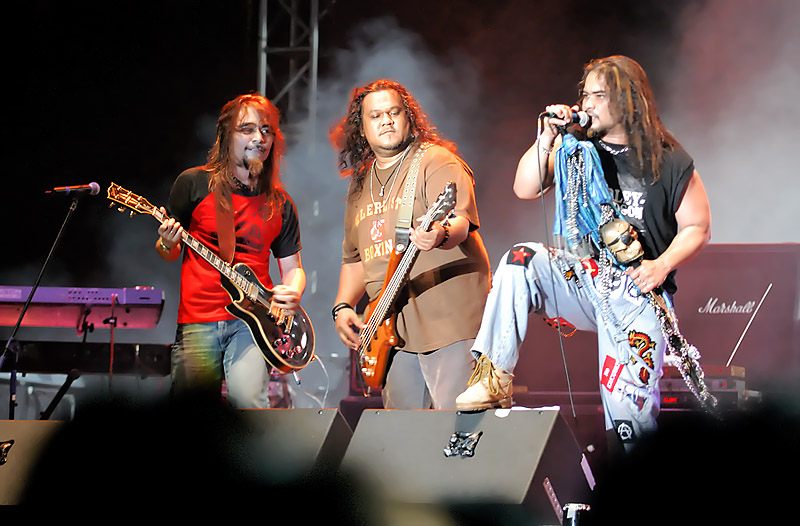

Background information
- Origin: Kuala Lumpur, Malaysia
- Genres: Hard rock; rock kapak; heavy metal; pop metal; glam metal; arena rock
- Years active: 1985–present
- Labels: ASP (1987–1989); BMG (1989–2002); Fly Wings (1989–2014); KRU Music (2014)
- Members: Awie; Kamarullizam bin Kamarudin/Syam; Edrie Hashim
- Past members: Mel; Mus; Abdul Zamin bin Abdul Kadir/ Joe; Rodzane bin Haji Mohamed/Jojet; Samsaidi Haji Ulong Idris/Eddie; Azmi Hashim/Black; Tham Wing Kwan
- Website: https://www.instagram.com/sayap2wings

Wings is a Malaysian rock kapak band formed in 1985 in Kuala Lumpur. They are known for heavy rock vocals. They have released numerous singles including "Taman Rashidah Utama", "Biarkan Berlalu", "Misteri Mimpi Syakila", "Sejati", "Di Ambang Wati" and "Semalam Yang Hangat".

== Members (since 1985) ==
=== Current lineup ===
- Ahmad Azhar bin Othman (Awie) – lead vocals (1985–1994, 2000–present)
- Kamarullizam bin Kamarudin (Syam) – lead, rhythm and slide guitar, background vocals (1985–1988, 2018–present; session musician 2017–2018)
- Edrie Hashim (Edrie) – rhythm, lead and slide guitar, backing vocals (2018–present; session musician 2017–2018)

After Joe left the group at the end of 2016, Wings used the name Wings & Superfriends for a while for the Wings & Superfriends Concert: Belenggu Irama held at Istana Budaya in 2017, Belenggu Irama Terbaik. This was because Wings agreed to require the services of two experienced lead guitarists, namely Syam, who is also an original member of Wings, and Edrie Hashim (Former member of the Chapters) as guest musicians who were given the title Superfriends to replace Joe. In 2018, Syam and Edrie officially joined Wings after Awie, Eddie and Black agreed to make the Wings group five members and the name Wings & Superfriends was no longer used.

- Ismail bin Zainuddin (Mel) – lead vocals (1995)
- Mustaffa Din (Mus) – lead vocals (1995–2000)
- Tham Wing Kwan (Tham) – lead, rhythm and slide guitar (1988)
- Abdul Zamin bin Abdul Kadir (Joe) – lead, rhythm and slide guitar, keyboards, backing vocals (1988–2016)
- Rodzane bin Haji Mohamed (Jojet) – drum, percussion (1990–1994)

=== Original membership lineup of Teruna Sekampung (1984–1985) ===
- Awie - lead vocals (1984–1985)
- Sham - lead guitar (1984–1985)
- Baharom - rhythm guitar (1984–1985)
- Ipin - bass (1984–1985)
- Zul - bass (1985)
- Eddie - bass (1985)
- Jojet - drum (1984–1985)
- Black - drum (1985)

== Discography ==
=== Studio albums ===
- Belenggu Irama (1987)
- Hukum Karma (1988)
- Teori Domino (1990)
- Jerangkung Dalam Almari (1991)
- Bazooka Penaka (1993)
- Orang Asing (1995)
- Puisi Aidilfitri (1996)
- Biru Mata Hitamku (1996)
- Mencari Asal Usul (1998)
- Mr. Barbarik (2000)
- Naga Kramat (2002)
- Raya Bersama Mus (2007)
- Menakluk Kosmos (2014)

=== Compilation albums ===
- Keunggulan Wings (1992)
- Best Of Wings (1992)
- Wings & Superfriends 1 (1994)
- Wings & Superfriends 2 (1994)
- MasterPiece J.S Kevin & Wings (1997)
- Best Of Wings 2 (1999)
- Trilogi (2001)
- The Greatest Hits Wings VS Search (2001)
- The Greatest Hits Wings VS Search Volume II (2001)
- Terunggul (2005)
- Memori Hit Wings VS Search (2006)
- Teori Domino Revisited (2007)
- Wings - Dua Dekad (2007)
- Memori Hit Wings (2008)
- Memori Hitz Wings (2009)
- Wings 25th Anniversary (2010)
- Lagenda Hits Album Search VS Wings (2015)
- Wings 30 Tahun (2015)

=== Duet albums (with Search) ===
- 1. Double Trouble (1992)
- 2. Double Trouble 2 (1998)

Theatrical appearances
Year	Title	Character
1990	Mat Som	Special Appearance
1993	Pebburu Bayang	Special Appearance - (Except Awie the main character)
1994	Putera	Except Awie who is tied to the film Sembilu
1995	Amelia	Joe
1995	WINGS Dalam Super Star	Joe (main character), Eddie & Black (special appearance), except Mel is not involved
2012	Awang Trasher	Joe - Special Appearance
2012	Leftwings	Special Appearance
2016	Rock Bro!	Black - Special Appearance
2020	Rock 4: Rockers Never Die	Awie - Special Appearance
2023	Sue On	Special Appearance - (except Awie the main character)
2024	Rebel	Special Appearance - (except Awie the main character)

== Concerts ==
- Konsert Kotaraya Live 1989
- Konsert Wings Stadium Merdeka 1991 - Sold in the form of VCD
- Alive The Legend Arises Wings "Alive 2006" At KL Orange Club - Sold in the form of CD, VCD & DVD
- Wings Live At Planet Hollywood 2007 -Sold in the form of CDs, VCDs
- Wings 21st Anniversary Live @ At Planet Hollywood 2008 - Sold in the form of CDs, VCDs
- Konsert Double Trouble (DT) Johor Bharu (2010) -Sold in the form of CDs
- Konsert Wings Opera Hidup At Istana Budaya (2011)
- Wings Rockestra At Istana Budaya (2013) -Sold in the form of CDs
- Wings Bongkar Takkan Melayu Hilang At Istana Budaya (2015)
- Konsert Wings 30 Tahun Di Stadium Merdeka (2015) - Sold in the form of CDs
- Wings Belenggu Irama & Superfriends At Istana Budaya (2017) - Broadcast on RTM channel
- Konsert Wings Kita Ok Bah (2018)
- Konsert Dari Rumah Lejen RTM (2020) - Broadcast on Astro channel
- Konsert Wings Kita Merdeka (2020) - Broadcast on Astro channel
- KMI In Person With: Wings (2021) - Broadcast on RTM channel without audience because COVID-19
- Konsert Mega Marhaen Pulau Pinang, Dataran terbuka Midtown PERDA Kubang Menerong, Tasek Gelugor, Penang (29 October 2022)
- Konsert The Rock Emperor Kuala Lumpur Chapter, Stadium Melawati Shah Alam (16 December 2023)
- Konsert The Rock Emperor Penang Chapter, Spice Arena Penang (24 February 2024)
- Konsert TRIAD - One Conquear All (Dragon Malaya, Wings & Search (Kiddin)), ZEPP Kuala Lumpur (14 February 2025)

Touring concerts

- Konsert Double Trouble at Stadium Negara Kuala Lumpur (1993)
- Konsert Double Trouble (DT) at Bukit Kiara Kuala Lumpur (1 May 2010)
- Konsert Double Trouble (DT) at Larkin, Johor Bahru (23 May 2010)
- Konsert Lagenda Double Trouble at Stadium Hang Jebat, Melaka (27 May 2011)

Anugerah Juara Lagu

Two songs from the album Hukum Karma, namely "Taman Rashidah Utama" and "Misteri Mimpi Syakila", qualified for the finals of the 4th Anugerah Juara Lagu. This was Wings' first time qualifying for the finals. With those two songs, Wings won second and third place in the best performance category. The song "Sejati" won in the best performance category and third place in the song champion category.

Year	Recipient/Nominated Work	Category	Result
1988	Wings	Best Rock Group	Won
1988	Awie	Best Male Singer	Won
1988	Black	Best Drummer	Won
1988	"Hukum Karma"	Best Rock Song	Won
1988	"Taman Rashidah Utama"	Best Slow Rock Song	Won

Year	Award	Recipient/Nominated Work	Category	Result
1989	4th Song Champion Award	"Taman Rashidah Utama"	Best Performance	Ranker
1989	4th Song Champion Award	"Misteri Mimpi Syakila"	Best Performance	Third Place
1990	5th Song Champion Award	"Sejati"	Best Performance	Won
1990	5th Song Champion Award	"Sejati"	Song Champion	Third Place

Anugerah Planet Muzik

Year	Award	Recipient/Nominated Work	Category	Results
2016	Anugerah Bintang Popular Berita Harian ke-29	Wings	Popular Collaboration/Duo/Group Artist	Won
