= Slam (Malaysian band) =

Malaysian rock kapak band

- Also known as: FIX (1993); SLAM Reunion (2015–2019)
- Origin: Johor Bahru, Johor, Malaysia
- Genres: Rock kapak; rock; pop rock; soft rock; hard rock
- Years active: 1993—present
- Label: BMG Music
- Members: Zamani; Shah; Ajak; Lili; Man; Eddie
- Past members: John; Ronnie Hussein
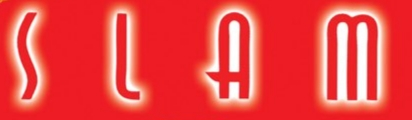

Slam is a Malaysian rock kapak band which was formed in Johor Bharu in the 1990s.

== History ==
According to The Malaysian Reserve, Slam, along with the 1990s Malaysian band Exists, is well known in Malaysia. There is an early connection between the two bands, where Shah was a guitarist in Exists with Along and released their debut album, Exist in December 1991. However, a dispute caused by management led Shah and Exist's manager, Allahyarham Johan Aziz left the band in early 1992. An invitation from Rahim Othman and BMG led Shah to form Slam with Johan as his manager. At first, Shah recruited several musicians at Johor such as rhythm guitarist Ajak who was Shah's relative in Singapore, bassist Lili who was also a Singaporean and drummer Man who was a friend of Ujang Exists, while vocalist Zamani were recruited at Kuala Lumpur by recommendation from Acong Sweet Child and Eddie, a former keyboardist of Ekamatra joined the band after Slam's second album, Kesan Terbukti were released in 1995. Slam's successful singles include "Gerimis Mengundang" and "Mentari Muncul Lagi". Slam is one of the music groups that rose to popularity in the local music scene. Musicians Zamani, Shah, Ajak, Lili, Man & Eddie became well-known after the success of their second album, Kesan Terbukti. This album featured hit songs, with five tracks reaching the top of the music charts in Malaysia and Indonesia, such as "Kembali Terjalin," "Tak Mungkin Berpaling," "Nur Kasih," "Manisnya Rindu," and "Bukan Niat Membalas Derita." They then continued to make strides with other hit songs such as "Jika Kau Rasa Getarnya", "Rindiani" and their evergreen track, "Gerimis Mengundang."

In 2015, the group's leader Shah announced that Slam would be reuniting with Zamani, Ajak, Eddie, Lili and Man. They held large-scale concerts, including a Slam Nur Kasih concert held in Johor Bahru in 2016.

The band was booked to appear at the Petronas Philharmonic Hall on 8 June 2024. Lead singer Zamani who had spinal surgery was optimistic that the show would take place without any problems. He had successfully performed twice at two major events after the surgery. According to Shah, Zamani had recently done a three-hour performance and everything was fine.

It was reported by the New Straits Times on 15 January 2025 that Datuk Nash of Lefthanded, Zamani of Slam, Ameng of Spring, and Jatt Ali of Black Dog Bone were to appear for the first time together in a concert at The Star Theatre in Singapore.

== Band members ==
- Zamani Ibrahim (Zamani) – vocals
- Shah Nizam Abdul Halim (Shah) – lead guitar
- Abdul Razak Bajuri (Ajak) – rhythm guitar
- Eddie Ahmad (Eddie) – keyboards
- Noor Azli Masrani (Lili) – bass
- Othman Khalid (Man) – Drums

== Discography ==
=== Studio albums ===
- Slam (1993)
- Kesan Terbukti (1995)
- Kembali Merindu (1996)
- Dalam Harapan (1998)
- Slamanja (2003)
- Menggapai Langit (2007)

=== Live albums ===
- Slam Live Concert Unplugged (1996)
- Slam Live Concert Unplugged 2 (1997)

=== Compilations ===
- Terbaik Slam (1995)
- Koleksi Khas (1996)
- Best of Slam (1999)

=== Indonesian market ===
- Tak Mungkin Berpaling (1996)
- Gerimis Mengundang (1997)
- Rindiani (1999)
