= Ramli Sarip =

Yang Berbahagia Datuk Ramli Sarip DPSM
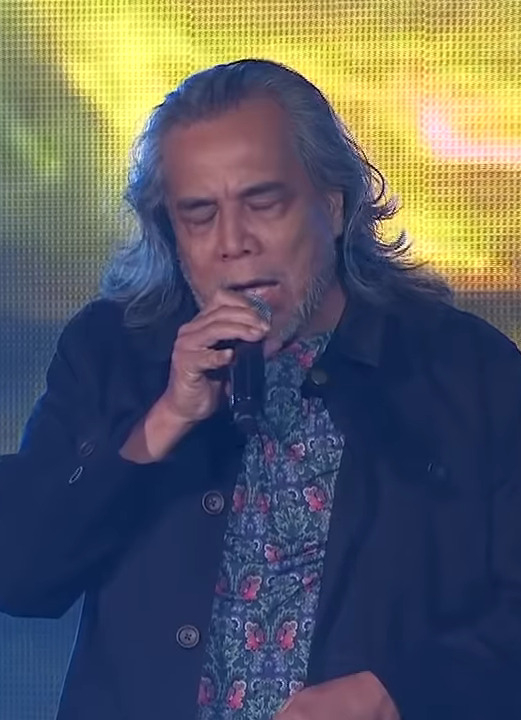
- Ramli performing on Anugerah MeleTOP Era 2015.
- Born: Ramli bin Sarip; 15 October 1952 (age 73); Singapore
- Other name: Papa Rock
- Occupations: Musician; singer; songwriter; arranger; record producer
- Years active: 1964–present
- Musical career
- Genres: Hard rock , Heavy Metal , Pop rock
- Instruments: Vocals, guitar
- Member of: Sweet Charity
- Formerly of: Lefthanded

Datuk Ramli bin Sarip (born 15 October 1952), also known as "Papa Rock", is a Singaporean musician, singer, songwriter, arranger and record producer. He is also one of the pioneers of Singapore's rock scene. Ramli was the front man and lead singer of the Singapore-based heavy metal-rock group Sweet Charity until 1986.

He was given the title of 'Datuk' by the Yang di-Pertua Negeri of the State of Malacca on the occasion of the latter's birthday in 2013.

== Career ==
=== 1964–1986: Sweet Charity ===
Established in 1964, the Singapore-based Malay rock band Sweet Charity had Ramli as its frontman and lead singer until he left in 1986. Sweet Charity was reportedly so successful in the 1970s to the 1980s that they ignited a "rock explosion" in both Singapore and Malaysia.

=== After 1986: Solo career and other endeavours ===
For some time, Ramli was signed under Warner Music. Ramli is credited as the "first Malay rock singer to hold two solo concerts at the Istana Budaya in Kuala Lumpur." He was awarded the COMPASS Artistic Excellence Award in 1998. He formed five-piece band, Sangkakala, to serve as his backing band. A 1990 Malaysian Hari Raya Puasa television special Bersama Ramli Sarip, in which Ramli hosted, was released on the first day of the season. Three years later, Radio Televisyen Malaysia had imposed a seven-year ban on him due to him maintaining his long hair, which was a strict performing no-no from the broadcaster at the time.

Ramli was a vocalist for the 2011 remake of "Home". As of 2011, Ramli has released 12 solo albums. He also starred in Talking Cock the Movie, a Singaporean satirical film in 2002. In 2019, after being critically criticised and lambasted for sung the "soulful" and "soul-stirring" version of Singapore's national anthem, he stays low profile for quite some time, whereby even Dr. Rohana Zubir (daughter of the late Zubir Said who was the original composer) came out to criticise heavily the rocker's rendition in an open letter in public, she wrote that, "Sadly, the revised rendition of 'Majulah Singapura' lacks the quality, the oomph, of a national anthem. It is rather tortuous to listen to." She further added: "The people of Singapore are wonderfully creative but this creativity should not extend to meddling with the musical score of the country's national anthem. This is one area where there should not be change. It is also important for Singaporeans to be proud of their history and to respect individuals, such as my father, for their contribution to nation-building."

=== 2019 National Day Parade ===
In 2019, Ramil Sarip performed "Majulah Singapura" at the National Day Parade.

=== 2025 National Day Parade ===
In 2025, Ramli Sarip performed a spoken-words rendition of "Majulah Singapura" together with Shye Anne Brown, Pallavi, and Tosh Zhang at the National Day Parade.

== Honours ==
=== Honours of Malaysia ===
- Malacca
  - Companion Class II of the Exalted Order of Malacca (DPSM) - Datuk (2013)
