= Zamani Ibrahim =

Malaysian singer and actress (born 1971)

- Born: Zamani bin Ibrahim; 25 May 1971 (age 54); Kuala Lumpur Hospital Malaysia
- Other names: Zamani Slam "The Living Legend" “The King of Sentimental”
- Occupations: Singer, musician, actor
- Years active: 1991–present
- Height: 1.65 m (5 ft 5 in)
- Spouse: Nur Juliana Abdul Rani (m. 2019)
- Musical career
- Genres: Pop rock, power ballad, hard rock, soft rock, rock kapak
- Instrument: Vocals
- Labels: BMG Music; Nova Music
- Formerly of: Slam

Zamani Ibrahim (born 25 May 1971) also known as Zamani Slam is a popular influential pop rock singer from Malaysia. He started his singing career through the famous 1990s pop group, Slam from 1993 to 1999. He then launched a solo music career in 2002 and is now one of the best singers in Malaysia and Indonesia as well as regional countries. His powerful and unique vocals has gained him fans from all ages until he was placed on a par with the best vocalists in the country.

In 1998, he was selected among the Nation’s most renowned artists to perform during the closing ceremony of the 1998 Commonwealth Games in front of Queen Elizabeth II, Prince Philip, Duke of Edinburgh and among delegates and officials from 70 countries including those from the States Commonwealth. He sang the popular Malaysian song Isabella 98 with Jamal Abdillah, Saleem Iklim and Amy Search.

Beginning in 2015, the Malaysian music industry were shocked by the news of his arrest. He had tested positive for morphine and have been tried with drug possession charges. He was then released on bail and have been admitted to a local rehabilitation center. After several months of treatment, he was declared free from drugs and began returned to stage in 2016.

His brother Zulfazli Ibrahim died on 19 November 2022. He died in his sleep.

== Career ==
=== 2020s ===
The New Straits Times reported on 15 January 2025 that four well-known veteran Malaysian and Singaporean vocalists, Datuk Nash of Lefthanded, Zamani of Slam, Ameng of Spring, and Jatt Ali of Black Dog Bone were to appear together in concert at The Star Theatre in Singapore. This event was to mark the first time that these artists would appear in concert together.

== Discography ==
=== Album ===
- Syair Si Pari-Pari (2002)
- TERBAIK ZAMANI (2010)
- Terima Kasih (2010)

=== Single ===
- Isabella '98 – with Jamal Abdillah, Amy and Saleem
- Syair Si Pari-Pari (2002)
- Kala Hujan (2004)
- Tak Keruan (2012) – with Sharifah Zarina
- Cahaya Asmara (2015)
- Tambatan Hati (2016)
- Aduh (2019)
- Lima Aksara (2019) - with Ezad Lazim
- Syawal Ini (2020)
- Yes Sir (2023; OST Coast Guard Malaysia: Ops Helang) - with Arif Peter

== Filmography ==
=== Film ===
Year	Title	Role	Notes
1999	Bara	Ziman	

=== Telemovie ===
Year	Title	Role	TV channel
2002	Syair Si Pari-Pari	Ikmal	VCD
2003	Hantu	Joe	VCD
2004	Celak Pak Andam	Firdaus	VCD

=== Television ===
Year	Title	Role	TV channel
2018	Gegar Vaganza (Season 5)	Participant	Astro Ria

== Awards and nominations ==
=== Anugerah Industri Muzik ===
Anugerah Industri Muzik Malaysia (AIM)
Year	Category	Nominated work	Result
1996	Best Vocal Performance in Album (Male)	Terbaik Slam	Nominated
1996	Best Song	Gerimis Mengundang	Nominated
1997	Best Vocal Performance in Album (Male)	Slam Live Concert Unplugged	Won
1997	Best Rock Album	Slam Live Concert Unplugged	Nominated
1997	Kembara Award		Won
1998	Best Vocal Performance in Album (Male)	Slam Live Concert Unplugged 2	Nominated
1998	Best Pop Album	Slam Live Concert Unplugged 2	Nominated
1999	Best Vocal Performance in Album (Male)	Dalam Harapan	Nominated
1999	Best Pop Album	Dalam Harapan	Nominated
2003	Best Vocal Performance in Album (Male)	Syair Si Pari-Pari	Nominated
2003	Best Song	Syair Si Pari-Pari	Nominated

=== Anugerah Juara Lagu ===
Anugerah Juara Lagu (AJL)
Year	Song	Composer	Lyricist	Result
1996	Gerimis Mengundang	Saari Amri	Saari Amri	Nominated
2002	Syair Si Pari-Pari	Aidit Alfian	Ad Samad	Nominated
2004	Kala Hujan	Aidit Alfian	Loloq	Nominated

=== Anugerah Bintang Popular Berita Harian ===
Anugerah Bintang Popular Berita Harian (ABPBH)
Year	Category	Result
1995	Popular Collaboration/Duo/Group (with Slam)	Nominated
1996	Popular Collaboration/Duo/Group (with Slam)	Nominated
1997/98	Popular Collaboration/Duo/Group (with Slam)	Nominated
2002	Popular Male Singer	Nominated

=== Others ===
Voice of Asia 1997

- Bronze Award (with Slam)

Anugerah Musik Indonesia 1999

- Special Award (with Slam)

Anugerah Era 2002

- Best Male Vocal

Gegar Vaganza 5 (2018)

- 3rd place
