= Iklim =

Malaysian rock band

- Origin: Kuala Terengganu, Terengganu
- Genres: Hard rock, rock kapak, blues rock, pop rock, heavy metal, pop metal, soft rock
- Years active: 1989–1999; 2003–present
- Labels: Suara Cipta Sempurna (Rock Records) (1990-1994); Warner Music Sdn Bhd (1994-1999); Nova Music (2004); FMC Music (2007); Rusa Music (2020-); HP Records Indonesia; Musica Studios Indonesia
- Members: Azmani (vocals); Umarul Mahdzar (guitar); Mohalim (bass); Huzali (keyboard); Kama (drum)
- Past members: Saleem Abdul Majeed (vocals, deceased); Khir Rahman (vocal)

Iklim (lit. 'Climate') is a Malaysian rock band that was active in Malaysia, Indonesia, Singapore, Brunei, southern Thailand, and the Cocos Islands in Australia during the 90s. Iklim was officially formed in 1990 in Kuala Terengganu and sang mostly rock kapak songs. Iklim became the whistle of the time because it was popular with the song "Suci Dalam Debu". Until now, Iklim songs have always played on the radio.

Their hit songs include "Suci Dalam Debu", "Bukan Aku Tak Cinta", "Mimpi Yang Pulang", "Hakikat Sebuah Cinta" and "Seribu Kali Sayang". The album Suci Dalam Debu sold 1,000,000 units in Indonesia, and raised the name of Iklim as a well-known and successful group in the neighbouring country to date.

== History ==
Iklim was founded in Terengganu and began when singer AM Saleem Abdul Majeed, known mononymously as "Saleem", in 1988, appointed a number of friends and young villagers to establish a singing group. In early 1989, before creating the name, Iklim often performed at clubs and ceremonies around the state.

In 1990, Suara Cipta Sempurna, a subsidiary of the Taiwanese record label Rock Records, made Iklim's first album recording. The debut single, "Suci Dalam Debu", became a hit. Other singles, such as "Hakikat Sebuah Cinta", "Satu Kesan Abadi", "Sandiwara Cinta Semusim Amma-Rah Bujang Kota" and "Seribu Penghargaan", were popular in Malaysia and Indonesia during the early 1990s.

== Lineups ==
Originally, Iklim's lineup consisted of five youths: AM Saleem Abdul Majeed (Saleem, d. 2018), Umarul Mahdzar, Mohd Salim (Mohalim), Kamaruddin (Kama) and Fadhil Suhaimi. However, fragmentation occurred when a second guitarist, Fadhil Suhaimi, left the band during the process of recording the first album. He was replaced by Huzali Ali as the instrument board tone player on the first album.

1988–1990

- Saleem – vocals
- Umarul – electric and acoustic guitar
- Mohalim – bass guitar
- Fadhil – guitarist
- Kama – drums

1990–1994

- Saleem – vocalist
- Umarul Mahdzar – electric and acoustic guitar
- Mohalim – bass guitar
- Kama – drums
- Huzali Ali – board tone

1994–1996

- Saleem – vocals
- Mohalim – bass guitar
- Kama – drum
- Huzali – board tone

1996–1997

- Mohalim – bass guitar
- Kama – drum
- Huzali – board tone
- Azmani – guest vocalist

1997 (special combined Dirgahayu album)

- Saleem – vocalist
- Mohalim – bass guitar
- Kama – drum
- Huzali – board tone

1998–1999

- Mohalim – bass guitar
- Kama – drum
- Huzali – board tone
- Khir – vocals
- Ghani – guitar

2003–2004 (Reunion Iklim)

- Saleem – vocals
- Umarul – main guitar
- Mohalim – bass guitar
- Kama – drum
- Huzali – board tone

2007 – Iklim & Frenz – Nuance '07

- Umarul – main guitar
- Mohalim – bass guitar
- Kama – drum
- Huzali – board tone
- Ghani – second guitar
- Guest Vocalists –
  - Faizal (AF)
  - Aris Ariwatan
  - J. Yantzen
  - Mus (May)
  - Joey (BPR)

2007–2020

- Umarul – guitar
- Mohalim – bass
- Kama – drums
- Huzali – board tone

2020–Present

- Azmani – vocal
- Umarul – guitar
- Mohalim – bass
- Kama – drums
- Huzali – board tone
