= Lefthanded (band) =

Malaysian rock band

- Also known as: The Lefthanded (1983), Down Wheels (1985)
- Origin: Johor, Malaysia
- Years active: 1979–1984; 1986–1996; 1999–2001; 2003; 2006–present
- Label: WEA
- Members: Nash; Man Kidal; Ritz Metalasia; Fly Halizor; Hafiz Man Dayak; Rio Rasul
- Past members: Dolly; Samad (deceased); Yus; Man Dayak (deceased); Yan; Esa (deceased); Tom Anuar; Arab

Lefthanded is a Malaysian rock band formed in Johor in 1979 by Man Kidal, Nash, Allahyarham Samad, Allahyarham Man Dayak, and Yan. Ramli Sarip founded this group in 1986.

== Background ==
According to The Sun, Lefthanded is one of Malaysia’s foremost rock bands. The band's guitarist is Man Kidal aka Rahman Mahmood. They were produced by Datuk Ramli Sarip, who was a member of the group Sweet Charity. Producing their work in the 1990s, Datuk Ramli Sarip and his band, Sweet Charity, were among the inspirations for the group.

They were formed in 1979 in Johor Bharu, Malaysia. Lefthanded are popular among Johor natives, along with Search. They became popular after they joined Battle of The Bands in the 1980s. The group's hits include "Tiada Lagi Kidungmu," "Ku Di Halaman Rindu," "Keadilan," "Seruan," "Ku Kehilangan Tiga Cinta Dimensi," "Kenangan Bersamamu," and "Debunga Wangi."

== History ==
Lefthanded was formed in 1979 in Johor Bahru, Johor with the original name, The Lefthanded. There, a group of five young teenagers of about the same age, namely Dolly (singer,) Man Kidal (lead guitar,) Yus (rhythm guitar,) Yan (bass) and Man Dayak (drums.) The name The Lefthanded was chosen because the leader of the group and its lead guitarist, Man Kidal, writes and plays the guitar with his left hand. Before recording the album, The Lefthanded was already active in the entertainment scene and often served as a backing band for several artists, including Ramli Sarip, Sahara Yaakob and Rahim Maarof. The Lefthanded's journey was briefly interrupted when Man Kidal and Yan (bass) joined the group Search to perform at the Red Rooster club, replacing Hillary Ang and Nasir Daud who left Search temporarily. Man Kidal and Yan were later involved in the production of Search's first album, Cinta Buatan Malaysia in 1985 under the PolyGram label.

In 1986, Man Kidal and Yan left Search to reactivate Lefthanded with its original member, Man Dayak. At the same time, Samad, who had taken on the guitar position in establishing the group Down Wheels after the absence of Man Kidal, also joined. Man Kidal and Yan in Down Wheels were retained to reactivate, making Lefthanded one of the earliest rock groups in Malaysia to feature two guitar heroes, similar to Dave Murray and Adrian Smith from the group Iron Maiden, a leading heavy metal group in the west.

Throughout their career, Lefthanded has changed vocalists several times, including Hamid, Rahim Maarof, Roy, Man Bai and Nash. With vocalist Roy, Lefthanded once participated in the Battle Of The Bands concert series organized by Ali Bakar through the Box Office company. Then when offered to record a song in the Battle Of The Bands compilation album, Nash was brought in as Lefthanded's permanent vocalist and from there, they began to sign a contract with an international recording company, WEA (now known as Warner Music). At the end of 1986, Lefthanded's debut album, Keadilan, began to land on the market with Ramli Sarip acting as the album producer.

Starting with Lefthanded's second album, titled Seruan, in 1987, Lefthanded brought in former Lizard member Esa to strengthen Lefthanded's music with keyboard elements. Maturity in terms of songwriting began to emerge through the album Evolusi in 1989.

== Later years ==
An article about the band appeared on the Malay Mail website, dated 15 January 2020. The band was set to appear at the Capitol Theatre in Singapore on 7 March that year with special guest, Datuk Ramli Sarip.

It was reported by the New Straits Times on 15 January 2025 that well-known veteran Malaysian and Singaporean vocalists, Datuk Nash of Lefthanded, Zamani of Slam, Ameng of Spring, and Jatt Ali of Black Dog Bone were to appear in concert at The Star Theatre in Singapore. This event was to mark the first time that these artists would appear in concert together.

== Member ==
=== Latest Member ===
1. Nashrudin bin Elias (Nash) - vocals Abdul Rahman bin Mahmood (Man Kidal) - lead guitar and band leader

Invitational Musicians:

1. Rizal Abdul Halim (Ritz Metalasia) - guitar Halizor Hussein (Fly Halizor) - bass (from Projek Pistol) Mohd NurHafiz bin Abdul Rahman (Hafiz Man Dayak) - drums Rozario Rasul (Rio) - keyboard

=== Past Members ===
1. Abdul Samad bin Mian (Samad) - guitar (died 23 October 2008)[1] Amran bin Marsiman (Yan) - bass Abdul Rahman bin Othman (Man Dayak) - drums (died 15 March 2016) Esa Bin Ayob (Esa/Isa) - keyboards (died 8 April 2024) Ramli Sarip - vocals Syed Azlan bin Syed Abu Bakar (Arab) - vocals (died 12 November 2016) Tom Anuar - drums

== Member exchange ==
After the album Evolusi (1989,) Dato Nash the lead singer, Yan the bass guitarist and Man Dayak the drummer left Lefthanded and were temporarily replaced by their own album producers, Dato Ramli Sarip, John and Tom Anuar respectively. Dato Ramli was willing to take Dato Nash's place because he did not want Lefthanded to be buried. Then John left Lefthanded because John had joined the groups Lestari and Stings and the vacancy was filled by Yan who rejoined the group Lefthanded. Dato Ramli and Yan managed to record an album titled Fanatisme (1990) with Lefthanded. Tom Anuar to record the album Fanatisme after the absence of Man Dayak. After that, Yan left this group due to their disagreements. Yan left Lefthanded because he wanted to rejoin the group Search which he had been a member of before and was replaced by Man Rani. Not long after in 1993, Man Rani and Tom Anuar left this group and were replaced by Carlos and Black.

In 1994, Carlos and Black were fired from the group Lefthanded due to drug and heroin addiction. Carlos was fired from Lefthanded because he wanted to join the group Lestari to replace John who left while Black wanted to rejoin the group Wings to replace Jojet who left who he was a member of before and the vacancy was filled by Yan and Man Dayak returned with Lefthanded. Arab singer and drummer Tom Anuar also joined Lefthanded when Lefthanded became the support band for Mr. Big's concert at Stadium Merdeka, Kuala Lumpur in 1994. The concert was recorded 'Live' and included in the album Nafas in 1996. The album also contained two new songs composed by Arab singers. Due to tight schedules and commitments, Man Kidal could not participate in the recording of the two new songs.

In 1997, Lefthanded won the Best Rock Album Award for the album Nafas at the 1997 Malaysian Music Industry Awards (AIM). In the same year, Lefthanded was officially predicted to be the end of the group when Man Kidal left Lefthanded and formed "Lefthanded '97", which was also joined by Dato Nash, Sham Kamikaze, Eddie and Lola XPDC while the members of Lefthanded decided to go their separate ways. In 1999, Lefthanded was reactivated with the new line-up of Nash (singer), Samad (guitar), Yan (bass) and Man Dayak (drums) to produce the album Syurga & Neraka (1999) with Samad, who also played the role of producer in addition to being the sole guitarist for the album. This album was also nominated among the finalists for the Best Rock Album at the 2000 Malaysian Music Industry Awards (AIM).

In 2003, Man Kidal returned and the compilation album Lefthanded - Reunion was released. They also held a 'Re-union' concert at Planet Hollywood and also a TV concert show on Astro channel Siri Dari Studio Satu. The Lefthanded concert at Planet Hollywood was held for the second time in 2006 but this time without Samad. The concert was recorded and resold in the form of an album titled Lefthanded - Live At Planet Hollywood 2006.

== Death ==
On 23 October 2008, Lefthanded lost their guitarist, Abdul Samad Mian or Samad, who died at the age of 45 due to suffocation after falling in his brother's office in Ampang. Apart from playing music, the deceased had been a lecturer at the National Academy of Arts, Culture and Heritage (ASWARA) since 2004.

On March 15, 2016, Lefthanded drummer Man Dayak, whose real name was Abdul Rahman Othman, died at the age of 54 due to a heart attack.

On November 12 of the same year, former Lefthanded vocalist, Syed Azlan Syed Abu Bakar or Arab, died at the age of 50 due to heart complications.

On April 8, 2024, former Lefthanded keyboard player, Esa died at the age of 62 at Columbia Tebrau Hospital, Johor Bahru at 7.40 pm due to a heart attack.

== Discography ==
=== Studio Album ===
==== Keadilan (1986) ====
1. Keadilan
2. Ku Kehilangan Cinta Tiga Dimensi
3. Sudi-Sudikah Dikau
4. Debunga Wangi
5. Hadapilah Dengan Sabar
6. Tiada Lagi Kidungmu
7. Ringan Berat
8. Lanun
9. Problem Malas
10. Lagenda Cinta

==== Seruan (1987) ====
1. Seruan
2. Kenangan Bersamamu
3. Inflasi
4. Sepanjang Riwayat Hidup (Untuk Ibu)
5. Rafidah Dan Sejarah
6. Alam Dan Pencipta
7. Sentuhan Kidal (Instrumental)
8. Antara Usaha Dan Nasib
9. Ku Di Halaman Rindu
10. Histeria (Instrumental)

==== Qabul (1988) ====
1. Hidup Dan Perjuangan
2. Janji Kesetiaan
3. Bertemu Di Dalam Rock 'N' Roll
4. Melangkah
5. Maya Persada
6. Di Lembah Kebendaan
7. Restu Yang Abadi
8. Rentasi Dunia Muzik
9. Mengejar Pelangi
10. Qabul (Instrumental)

==== Evolusi (1989) ====
1. Carilah
2. Pencinta
3. Perjalanan
4. Mentari
5. Parasit
6. Arah Yang Hilang
7. Rockrama
8. Detik Masa
9. Roda-Roda
10. Keindahan Sepi

==== Fanatisme (1991) ====
1. Semangat Lamina
2. Satu Tidur Panjang
3. Pesta Hidup Di Kota Raya
4. Blues
5. Impian Setaman
6. Suatu Bayangan
7. Perjalanan Cinta Abadi
8. Akal
9. Lingkaran Sejarah Kita
10. Tenat

==== Seleksi Lagenda Lefthanded (1992) ====
1. Ku Kehilangan Cinta Tiga dimensi
2. Tiada lagi Kidungmu
3. Kenangan Bersamamu
4. Seruan
5. Debunga Wangi
6. Maya Persada
7. Ku Di Halaman Rindu
8. Semangat Lamina
9. Pencinta
10. Keindahan Sepi
11. Restu Yang Abadi
12. Satu Tidur Panjang
13. Impian Setaman
14. Lagenda Cinta

==== Nafas (1996) ====
1. Seruan (Live)
2. Keadilan (Live)
3. Hidup Dan Perjuangan (Live)
4. Sutra (New Single)
5. Maya Persada (Acoustic Version)
6. Sentuhan Kidal (Instrumental) (Bonus Track)
7. Blues (Live)
8. Debunga Wangi (Live)
9. Semangat Lamina (Live)
10. Nafas Rindu (Lagu Baru)
11. Kenangan Bersamamu (Acoustic Version)

==== Syurga & Neraka (1999) ====
1. Syurga Dan Neraka
2. Marga Jiwa
3. Mencari Sinar
4. Pendita Mimpi
5. Bantai Blues
6. Dahan Menanti
7. Tenang
8. Hamparan Putih
9. Akal Sinikal
10. Rahsia Kita

==== Lefthanded Reunion (2003) ====
CD 1:

1. Keadilan
2. Ku Kehilangan Cinta Tiga Dimensi
3. Sudi-Sudikah Dikau
4. Debunga Wangi
5. Lagenda Cinta
6. Tiada Lagi Kidungmu
7. Seruan
8. Kenangan Bersamamu
9. Alam Dan Pencipta
10. Ku Di Halaman Rindu
11. Sentuhan Kidal (Instrumental)
12. Semangat Lamina (Live)

CD 2:

1. Hidup Dan Perjuangan
2. Maya Persada
3. Bertemu Di Dalam Rock 'N' Roll
4. Mengejar Pelangi
5. Qabul
6. Carilah
7. Pencinta
8. Arah Yang Hilang
9. Semangat Lamina
10. Satu Tidur Panjang
11. Sutra
12. Debunga Wangi (Live)

==== Live & Unplugged at Planet Hollywood '06 (2006) ====
CD 1:

1. [Live] - Seruan
2. [Live] - Sudi-Sudikah Dikau
3. [Live] - Keadilan
4. [Live] - Lagenda Cinta
5. [Live] - Lanun
6. [Live] - Perfect Strangers
7. [Live] - Debunga Wangi
8. [Unplugged] - Ku Kehilangan Cinta Tiga Dimensi
9. [Unplugged] - Kenangan Bersamamu
10. [Unplugged] - Soldier Of Fortune
11. [Unplugged] - Ku Di Halaman Rindu

CD 2:

1. [Live] - Bertemu Di Dalam Rock 'N' Roll (Hattan)
2. [Live] - Qabul (Instrumental)
3. [Live] - Semangat Lamina (Yantzen)
4. [Live] - Smoke On The Water (Hattan, Rahim Maarof & Yan)
5. [Live] - Sentuhan Kidal (Instrumental)
6. [Live] - Arah Yang Hilang (Muix Metalasia)
7. [Live] - Ringan Dan Berat (Yan)
8. [Live] - Pada Syurga Di Wajahmu (Nash)
9. [Live] - Tiada Lagi Kidungmu
10. [Encore] - Alam Dan Pencipta

==== Memori Hit Lefthanded (2008) ====
CD1:

1. Keadilan (4:05)
2. Ku Kehilangan Cinta 3 Dimensi (4:35)
3. Sudi-Sudikah Dikau (3:44)
4. Debunga Wangi (5:22)
5. Lagenda Cinta (4:14)
6. Tiada Lagi Kidungmu (3:28)
7. Seruan (5:08)
8. Kenangan Bersamamu (4:36)
9. Alam Dan Pencipta (5:19)
10. Ku Di Halaman Rindu (5:21)
11. Sentuhan Kidal (Instrumental) (3:17)
12. Semangat Lamina (Live) (5:43)

CD2:

1. Hidup Dan Perjuangan (3:02)
2. Maya Persada (5:21)
3. Bertemu Di Dalam Rock N Roll (4:31)
4. Mengejar Pelangi (4:50)
5. Qabul (5:00)
6. Carilah (5:15)
7. Pencinta (5:22)
8. Arah Yang Hilang (7:44)
9. Semangat Lamina (5:04)
10. Satu Tidur Panjang (6:09)
11. Sutra (5:27)
12. Debunga Wangi (Live) (6:40)

==== Lagenda Hit Lefthanded (2010) ====
CD 1:

1. Tiada Lagi Kidungmu (3:27)
2. Lagenda Cinta (4:12)
3. Debunga Wangi (5:20)
4. Keadilan (4:03)
5. Kenangan Bersamamu (4:36)
6. Sepanjang Riwayat Hidup (Untuk Ibu) (4:13)
7. Mengejar Pelangi (4:50)
8. Keindahan Sepi (4:17)
9. Restu Yang Abadi (4:03)
10. Sudi-Sudikah Dikau (3:42)
11. Satu Tidur Panjang (6:10)
12. Seruan (5:07)

CD 2:

1. Ku Kehilangan Cinta Tiga Dimensi (4:34)
2. Ku Di Halaman Rindu (5:20)
3. Pencinta (4:13)
4. Lanun (3:59)
5. Maya Persada (4:50)
6. Rockrama (4:43)
7. Impian Setaman (4:55)
8. Carilah (5:15)
9. Hidup Dan Perjuangan (3:01)
10. Sutra (5:26)
11. Semangat Lamina (5:04)
12. Perjalanan Cinta Abadi (5:32)
