= Rusty Blade =

Singaporean heavy metal band

- Origin: Singapore
- Genres: Heavy metal; hard rock
- Years active: 1981–1990; 2007–present (reunions)
- Members: Khalid Mobin; Noor Hendrix; Azizan Abu Bakar; Yantzen Juniwan
- Past members: Mamat; Razak; Zan; Izad; Man Karen

Rusty Blade is a Singaporean heavy metal band formed in 1981 that made a name for itself in Malaysia, partly due to the fact that its members were Malay, and their songs were sung in that language. It originally consisted of vocalist Yantzen Juniwan, guitarists Khalid Mobin and Mamat, bassist Razak, and drummer Zan. They went on an indefinite hiatus in 1990 and have since held several reunion shows and remain sporadically active. They have released three studio albums and one EP.

== History ==
After their formation in 1981, Rusty Blade began performing in the southern Malaysian city of Johor Bahru. They released their debut EP, 786 Ikrar Perwira, in 1986, and followed up with a full-length studio album in 1987, titled Rintangan Hidup Dunia, which sold over 25,000 units and was certified Gold. By this point, guitarist Mamat had been replaced by Izad, and the band began touring throughout Peninsular Malaysia. Izad was later replaced by Md. Noor "Hendrix" Md. Zain. The band released its second studio album, Berat, in 1988, which sold over 50,000 units and was certified Platinum. That year, bassist Razak departed the band; he was eventually replaced by Sulaiman Ibrahim (Man Karen). Rusty Blade's third album, Awas, came out in 1989, after which the band went on indefinite hiatus.

Over the years, Rusty Blade has played a number of reunion shows, and they remain intermittently active. Man Karen died of brain cancer in 2024.

== Band members ==
Current

- Yantzen Juniwan – vocals
- Khalid Mobin – guitar
- Noor Hendrix – guitar
- Azizan Abu Bakar – drums

Past

- Mamat – guitar
- Razak – bass
- Zan – drums
- Izad – guitar
- Sulaiman Ibrahim (Man Karen) – bass

== Discography ==
- 786 Ikrar Perwira (EP, 1986)
- Rintangan Hidup Dunia (1987)
- Berat (1988)
- Awas (1989)
