= Search (band) =

Malaysian rock band

- Origin: Johor, Malaysia
- Genres: Rock kapak, heavy metal, hard rock, glam rock, glam metal
- Years active: 1981–present
- Labels: Polygram Records (1984–1987); BMG Music (1989–2001); Life Records (2006)
- Members: Amy Search; Hillary Ang; Man Kidal; Nasir; Kid; Din; Yan; Amir Masdi; Minn
- Past members: See former members below
- Website: duniasearch.com.my

Search is a rock kapak band formed in Johor Bahru, Malaysia, in 1981 by drummer Yazit, lead guitarist Hillary Ang, bassist Nasir, rhythm guitarist Nordin and singer Amy. Their debut album was produced by Polygram Records (Singapore). The group have gone through many line-up changes in their career, but the songs and music have remained strong and unique among Malaysian, Singaporean and Indonesian fans. To date, they released eleven studio albums, number of lives, compilation and joint (with Wings) albums. They have been regarded by Malaysian rock fans as the greatest rock band in Malaysia with their numerous hits along with rock anthems.

== Band members ==
- Nordin Mohd Taib – rhythm guitar (1981–1999, 2003–2006, 2008–2023)
- Hamzah Mohd Taib – lead guitar (1989–1999, 2003–2006, 2009–present)
- Amran Marsiman – bass (1984–1985, 1990–1994, 2021–present)
- Minn – drums (2022–present)
- Amir Masdi - vocals (2024–present)

Current touring musician

- Awie – vocals (1998–1999, 2020–2021)
- Akim – vocals (2021)
- Denden Gonjalez – vocals (2021–2023)
- Pae – drums (2016–2021)
- Minn – drums (2022–present)

Former touring musicians

- Rafi – Rhythm guitar (1999–2001)

Past members

- Zainal Rampa – vocals, rhythm guitar (1977–1981)
- Moq – vocals (1999–2001)
- Shah Slam – lead guitar (1999–2001)
- Memek – bass (1977–1981)
- Fauzi – bass (1998–1999)
- Zam – bass (1999–2001)
- Yazit Ahmad – drums (1977–2001, 2005–2016; died 2019)
- Lola – drums (2003–2005)

== Discography ==
=== Studio Albums & Tracklists ===
- Cinta Buatan Malaysia (1985)

1) "Isi Atau Kulit" 2) "Cinta Buatan Malaysia" 3) "Cinta Sepi" 4) "Cinta Pertama" 5) "Sirih Gambir" 6) "Balada Pemuzik Jalanan" 7) "Kejora" 8) "Nombor" 9) "Jiwa-Jiwa Luka" 10) "Musafir"

- Langit Dan Bumi (1986)

1) "Musnah" 2) "Meniti Titian Usang" 3) "Langit Dan Bumi" 4) "Rozana" 5) "Tumbuk Rusuk" 6) "Pasti" 7) "Bisa" 8) "Mencari Sebuah Nama" 9) "Pada Satu Kedudukan" 10) "Kau Pergi"

- Mentari Merah Diufuk Timur (1987)

1) "Pelesit Kota" 2) "Fantasia Bulan Madu" 3) "Gelora Cintaku" 4) "Gadisku" 5) "Bunga Pesona" 6) "Pembakar Perasaan" 7) "Sebatang Tongkat Untuk Berdiri" 8) "Serigala Segalanya" 9) "Mat Rock" 10) "Mentari Merah Di Ufuk Timur"

- Fenomena (1989)

1) "Fenomena" 2) "Purnama" 3) "Isabella" 4) "Derap Komando" 5) "Ku Taklukkan Dunia" 6) "Menara Kesesatan" 7) "Bencana" 8) "Pawana" 9) "Songsang" 10) "Gadis Misteri"

- Karisma (1990)

1) "Melastik Ke Bintang" 2) "Melayar Bahtera" 3) "Orang Timur" 4) "Dunia Milik Kita" 5) "Emmanuelle" 6) "Memandu Nafsu" 7) "Teguh" 8) "Manusia Reptilia" 9) "Paranoid" 10) "Orait Mama" 11) "Sutera Atau Rayon"

- Rampage (1992)

1) "Neo Romantik" 2) "Asli dan Tulus" 3) "Berbagai Wajah" 4) "Metropolitan" 5) "Analogi 0.1" 6) "Feel the Pain" 7) "Nigina" 8) "Sederhana" 9) "Bertopeng Cinta" 10) "Nirmala"

- Gema Di Timur Jauh (1995)

1) "Laila Namamu Teratas" 2) "Cintaku Hilang Bisanya" 3) "Menuju Puncak" 4) "Hello Kawan!" 5) "Pinball Superhero" 6) "Honky Tong Kosong" 7) "Jeritan Rindu" 8) "Roket" 9) "Bersalah Atau Tidak" 10) "No Way!!!" 11) "Andai Ku Miliki Semalam"

- Rock 'N' Roll Pie (1996)

1) "Panggung Khayalan" 2) "Seroja" 3) "Rock & Roll Pie" 4) "Melintasi Batas" 5) "Satu Bangsa, Satu Arah" 6) "Kereta Merah" 7) "Mengundur Waktu" 8) "Diari Habil & Qabil" 9) "Nantikan Gerimis" 10) "Mata Kucing"

- Bikin Wilayah (1998)

1) "Mancis Dah Basah" 2) "Bayangan Baiduri" 3) "Zen (Bikin Wilayah)" 4) "Setia Dalam Kacamu" 5) "Ichiban" 6) "Kanta Biru" 7) "Ghairah Malam 15" 8) "Mutiara Embun" 9) "Penghujung Jalan" 10) "Nur Nilam Sari"

- Selepas Banjir (1999)

1) "Selepas Banjir" 2) "Setanggi Ranjang Malam" 3) "Cintaku Karya Tuhan" 4) "Millenium Sakral" 5) "Pergilah" 6) "Cadar Tak Berganti" 7) "Zingaro Blues" 8) "Jaga-Jaga" 9) "Panakea" 10) "Kejoraku Bersatu"

- Gothik Malam Edan (2006)

1) "Memoria Anna" 2) "Gothik Malam Edan" 3) "Ampun" 4) "Yin & Yang" 5) "Gurindam Cinta Khayam" 6) "Lara Tari Pencinta" 7) "Irama Marakas" 8) "Menawan Raga" 9) "Penjaga Rahsia" 10) "Nyata Dan Maya"

- Katharsis (2017)

1) "Gagalista" 2) "Sidang Kangaroo" 3) "Nama Yang Kau Lupa" 4) "Mitos Atau Nyata" 5) "Henjut" 6) "Sulalatus Salatin" 7) "Jubah Pengantin" 8) "Apologia" 9) "Embun" 10) "Bebas Liar"
