= Ilham Bicara =

Studio album by Ella
- Released: 8 November 2001
- Recorded: 1999 – 2001
- Studios: Synchrosound Studio (Petaling Jaya, Selangor)
- Genre: Hard rock
- Length: 67:22
- Label: EMI Music Malaysia
- Producers: Tarmizi "Miji" Mokhtar; Django; Amin Abdullah; Ajai; Ramli Sarip; Kyoji Yamamoto; Zul Mahat; Ella; Korie

Ella chronology
Diva Metal (2000)	Ilham Bicara (2001)	Puteri Rock (2002)

Singles from Ilham Bicara
- 1. "Tinggal Tanda Tanya" Released: 2001; 2. "Retak" Released: 2002; 3. "Nan Berbeza" Released: 2002

Ilham Bicara (English: Inspiration to Speak) is the seventh studio album by Malaysian singer, Ella, released on 8 November 2001 by EMI Music Malaysia. It was a critical and commercial success, selling 50,000 copies and went on to be certified platinum. Three singles were released from the album. It is her first album to be produced by Ramli Sarip since Identiti from 1992 and also to be produced by Kyoji Yamamoto since Ella USA from 1994. The album was also her first album to have the title track since Puteri Kota from 1990. A platinum edition of the album was released in 2002.

== Production ==
Ilham Bicara was Ella's fourth collaboration with Ramli Sarip after they previously working together on her first three albums; and also her second collaboration with Kyoji Yamamoto, who produced her fifth album, Ella USA. Besides Ramli and Yamamoto, Ella also get in touch with Amin Abdullah, Django, Ajai and Cromok drummer Tarmizi "Miji" Mokhtar to be the album's producer. She also reprise her role as the producer besides with her younger brother, Korie. After a much period of introspection and contemplation, she decided to blended both hard rock and pop rock.

The album was recorded at Synchrosound Studios in Petaling Jaya, Selangor and took two years to completed. Azmeer and Zul Mahat contributed significantly on the album; he composed two songs, the title track and "Nekad" while Zul composed the other two - "Kerlipan" and "Cendawan dan Serangga". For the song "Dia Lelaki", Ella get in touch with her producer, Ramli Sarip as her duet partner; the melody for the latter was composed by Ramli with lyrics written by Bob Lokman. For "Nan Berbeza", Ella was joined by her older sister, Jojie, as her duet partner. The song also features Rez, a former member of now-defunct Malaysian hip-hop trio, Da' Joint, who contributed rap in English.

Ilham Bicara also included a cover version of "Jauh di Mata", a classical Malay song composed by S. Effendy and originally performed by Ahmad Jais and Sharifah Aini. According to Ella, the song was specially dedicated to her late father, Aminuddin Manap, who died in 1990. Emmett, vocalist of Malaysian alternative grunge band Butterfingers plays violin; while Hillary Ang, guitarist of Cromok, plays guitar for the latter.

== Release and reception ==
The album was released on 8 November 2001 and spawned three singles: "Tinggal Tanda Tanya", "Retak" and "Nan Berbeza". At the same time, music videos for "Tinggal Tanda Tanya" and "Retak" was produced. The album was well-received, selling 50,000 copies and being certified platinum.

Upon release, Ilham Bicara received generally positive reviews from music critics, who praised the album's overall sound, which they felt that not too much different from her previous albums. Zainal Alam Kadir, writing for the New Straits Times, noted the album was seen "as a way for her to 'undo' her previous attempts". Meor Shariman from The Malay Mail described the album "sounds fresh and exciting". Ku Seman Ku Hussein from Mingguan Malaysia reflected the album as a "sign of maturity" from her previous releases. Reviewing for Berita Minggu, Ellyna Ali considered the album as one of the most revealing work by Ella.

A platinum edition of the album was released in June 2002 with a shuffled track listing and containing three tracks, "Lagenda 25" and reworked version of "Nuri" and "P.P.P.". "Retak", the album's second single, was later re-recorded by Indonesian hip-hop group, Soul ID for the Urban Strike compilation album, which was released in 2006 by EMI Music Malaysia and Virgin Records in collaboration with Celcom X-Pax.

== Track listing ==
Standard edition
No.	Title	Writer(s)	Length
1.	"Ilham Bicara"	Azmeer	4:50
2.	"Nan Berbeza" (feat. Jojie and Rez of Da' Joint)	Pacai, Aji, Kelly	4:36
3.	"Tinggal Tanda Tanya"	Django	4:49
4.	"Kau Tak Tahu"	Aidit Alfian, Ajai	4:28
5.	"Tak Kisah"	Azam Dungun, Bong	5:22
6.	"Retak"	Amin Abdullah	5:19
7.	"Cendawan dan Serangga"	Zul Mahat, Loloq	5:18
8.	"Dia Lelaki" (feat. Ramli Sarip)	Ramli Sarip, Bob Lokman	5:08
9.	"Kerlipan"	Zul Mahat, Amran Omar	4:17
10.	"Nekad"	Azmeer, Azam Dungun	4:17
11.	"Jauh di Mata"	Copyright Control	4:16
12.	"Retak" (Adunan Berbelah Bagi)	Amin Abdullah	5:08
13.	"Tinggal Tanda Tanya" (Karaoke version)	Django	4:49
14.	"Ilham Bicara" (Karaoke version)	Azmeer	4:50
Total length:			67:22

Platinum edition
No.	Title	Writer(s)	Length
1.	"Nuri" (Rock version)	Ella, Hamid, Loloq	4:22
2.	"P.P.P." (Rock version)	Yusry KRU	4:05
3.	"Lagenda 25"	Fauzi Marzuki, Habsah Hassan	5:18
Total length:			76:42

Notes

- Standard edition of Ilham Bicara contains two karaoke versions of "Ilham Bicara" and "Tinggal Tanda Tanya".

== Certifications ==
Region	Certification	Certified units/sales
Malaysia	Platinum	50,000
