= 30110 =

Studio album by Ella
- Released: 14 March 1992
- Recorded: 1991 – 1992
- Studios: King Studio (Petaling Jaya, Selangor); Scat Studio (Kuala Lumpur)
- Genre: Hard rock
- Length: 54:22
- Label: EMI Music Malaysia
- Producers: M. Nasir; Man Kidal

Ella chronology
Ella Mood (1991)	30110 (1992)	Kesal (1992)

Singles from 30110
- 1. "Sembilu" Released: 1991; 2. "Kitalah Bintang" Released: 1992; 3. "Layar Impian" Released: 1992

30110 is the fourth studio album by Malaysian singer, Ella, released on 14 March 1992 by EMI Music Malaysia. It was her first studio album with EMI after having previously been signed to Warner Elektra Atlantic. Three singles were released from the album, which was recorded and produced in collaboration with M. Nasir and Man Kidal. It was a commercial hit upon release, selling 250,000 copies and being certified triple platinum. In 2021, Harian Metro listed it as one of the 10 best Malaysian album of all time. It also received its first official vinyl releases.

== Production ==
After the release of Identiti (1990), Ella broke off her album collaboration with Ramli Sarip and approached M. Nasir and Man Kidal to become the producers of her next album. Following the expiration of her recording contract with Warner Elektra Atlantic (WEA; now Warner Music), Ella signed with EMI Music Malaysia in July 1991 and began recording material for her third album, which was being titled as 30110. According to Ella, the album was named after the serial numbers on cassette tapes to indicate its authenticity.

On the album, Ella provides both lead and backing vocals on all tracks. Three musicians played their respective musical instruments in the album. Man Kidal on both guitars and acoustic guitars as well as keyboards, Yem Bai on bass and Izan of Rusty Blade on drums. Songwriting was handled by M. Nasir who composed two songs and wrote lyrics for "Penjara Misteri", while Aris Ariwatan, Lokman "Lord" Idris and Saari Amri composed each songs respectively. 30110 marks Ella's first collaboration with Man Kidal.

The album was recorded in two different studios, namely King Studio in Petaling Jaya, Selangor and Scat Studio in Kuala Lumpur. For the first time in her music career, Ella included an instrumental version of "Sembilu", making 30110 her first album to have an instrumental song. She would later emphasise instrumental music on her subsequent album, Ella USA (1994). The album's cover art was conceptualised by Kerengge of Silk Screen, designed by Malaysian illustrator and graphic designer, Mustaffa "Tapa" Hidzir with a photography taken by Artier Studio and Jen Studio. The main album cover is said to be influenced by the work of American pop art artist, Andy Warhol, featuring full purple hues and stylised portrait of Ella's face.

== Release and promotion ==
The album was released on 14 March 1992. To promote the album, three songs, "Sembilu", "Kitalah Bintang" and "Layar Impian" were released as the main singles and became chart-topping hits across Malaysia. Music videos were produced for "Sembilu" and "Layar Impian" and began premiered on MTV.

She also toured Kuala Lumpur and other states in Malaysia including Perlis, Kedah, Penang and Selangor to promote the album, using 13 Sri Jaya buses with the album cover's poster placed at the buses' back view, with 300 copies of the poster was printed. However, the album's meet-and-greet session in Alor Setar, Kedah was cancelled owing to several of Ella's fans became unruly and out of control. She supported the album with the Konsert Bergerak Ella 30110, which was began from 12 June in Kajang, Selangor and ended on 1 July 1992 in Life Centre, Jalan Sultan Ismail, Kuala Lumpur. Ella also toured Japan to promote 30110 in collaboration with Kyoji Yamamoto of Japanese heavy metal band, Bow Wow.

== Reception ==
The album was well-received, earning a 5x platinum certification after selling more than 250,000 units by December 1992. As of June 1998, the album's sales increased to 340,000 copies; and were increased to 350,000 copies in 2001. The album became one of the best-selling Malaysian albums of all time, and become the sole female rock singer to be recognised by The Malaysia Book of Records following 30110's increased sales. "Kitalah Bintang" was later re-recorded by Malaysian boy band, KRU for the Urban Strike compilation album, while "Layar Impian" was later re-recorded by Malaysian hip-hop duo, Too Phat for the same compilation, which was released in 2006 by EMI Music Malaysia and Virgin Records in collaboration with Celcom X-Pax. In 2021, Harian Metro selected the album (and Ella USA) as the 6th best Malaysian album of all time, the highest ranked of Ella's two solo albums on the list.

== Track listing ==
No.	Title	Writer(s)	Length
1.	"Sembilu"	Saari Amri	5:21
2.	"Layar Impian"	Lord, Nurbisa	5:06
3.	"Kitalah Bintang"	Aris Ariwatan, Iman Zali, Loloq	4:06
4.	"Kabus & Sirna"	M. Nasir, Nurbisa	5:32
5.	"Penjara Misteri"	Yan, M. Nasir	3:57
6.	"12 Purnama"	Fauzi Marzuki, S. Amin Shahab	5:30
7.	"Bendera Damai"	Hassan Babylon, Loloq	3:01
8.	"Justeru"	Hattan, Nurbisa	5:26
9.	"Bolero"	M. Nasir, Loloq	5:57
10.	"Mat Kental"	Aidit Alfian, Baba	5:02
11.	"Sembilu" (instrumental)	Saari Amri	5:20
Total length:			54:22

== Certifications ==
Region	Certification	Certified units/sales
Malaysia	5× Platinum	250,000

== Credits and personnel ==
Credits adapted from 30110 booklet liner notes.

- Ella - vocals, backing vocals, co-producer
- Man Kidal - guitars, acoustic guitars, keyboards, producer, arranger, mixer
- Yem Bai - bass
- Izan of Rusty Blade - drums
- M. Nasir - producer, arranger
- Hattan - arranger
- Ikhmal Hisham - executive producer, management
- Mohd Arzmy - executive producer
- Peter Chong - mixer
- Jackie - recorder
- Kamal Shamsuddin - recorder
- Ron Chong - recorder
- Fauzi Marzuki - recorder (pre-production)
- Hillary Ang - recorder (pre-production)
- Achat - technician
- Jamil - technician
- Rashid - technician
- Azmi Zainal Abidin - production manager
- Mustaffa "Tapa" Hidzir - cover design, concept
- Artier Studio - photography
- Jen Studio - photography
- King Studio - recording and mixing studio
- Capitol Studios - mastering studio

== Release history ==
Release history
Region	Date	Format(s)	Label	Ref.
Malaysia	March 14, 1992	CD; cassette; music download; streaming	EMI Music Malaysia	
