= Shock Waves (Vow Wow album) =

Shock Waves (album)

Compilation album by Vow Wow
- Released: 1986
- Recorded: February–April and October–November 1985
- Genre: Heavy metal
- Length: 43:26
- Label: Capitol ST-12541
- Producer: Tony Platt, Vow Wow

Vow Wow chronology
III (1986)	Shock Waves (album) (1986)	Hard Rock Nights (1986)

Professional ratings
Review scores
Source	Rating
Collector's Guide to Heavy Metal	4/10

Shock Waves is a compilation album by Japanese heavy metal band Vow Wow. The album was released in 1986 in the USA and contains most of the songs from the Tony Platt-produced album III (1986), with the addition of "Beat of Metal Motion" and "You Know What I Mean" from the albums of 1984 and 1985 respectively.

== Track listing ==
Side one

1. "Nightless City" - 4:55
2. "Shot in the Dark" - 3:41
3. "Running Wild" - 4:28
4. "Signs of the Times" - 4:05
5. "Go Insane" - 4:22

Side two

1. "Beat of Metal Motion" - 4:46
2. "Stay Close Tonight" - 4:29
3. "Shock Waves" - 4:58
4. "You Know What I Mean" - 4:10
5. "Doncha Wanna Cum (Hangar 15)" - 3:32

== Personnel ==
- Kyoji Yamamoto - guitars, backing vocals
- Genki Hitomi - lead vocals
- Rei Atsumi - keyboards, backing vocals
- Kenji Sano - bass, backing vocals
- Toshihiro Niimi - drums
