= Untitled (Cromok album) =

Studio album by Cromok
- Released: 15 August 2004
- Recorded: 2003–2004
- Studio: King Studio (Kuala Lumpur)
- Genre: Thrash metal
- Length: 56:03
- Label: EMI Music Malaysia
- Producer: Cromok

Cromok chronology
Engraved in Eternity (2003)	Untitled (2004)	Untitled+Raw (2005)

Untitled is the seventh studio album by Malaysian rock band, Cromok, released on 15 August 2004 by EMI Music Malaysia. A live version of the album, Untitled+Raw, was released in 2005.

== Production ==
More than two years after the success of their sixth album Deafening Silence (2002), Cromok announced that they will be releasing their new album for release in August 2004, titled as Untitled. The band had released a compilation album, Engraved in Eternity beforehand and spent most of 2003 and 2004 to recorded all tracks in the album, in which they would gradually revise the arrangement until its final revision.

Untitled is the last studio album Cromok had released before the band went on hiatus two years later. This is also the band's last album with the then-guitarist Hillary Ang before he rejoined Search a year later.

== Artwork ==
The album's cover art featuring a sketches of unicorn's head and the album's title, which drawn by Tasnim Tarmizi, a 6-year-old daughter of Cromok's drummer Miji.

== Release and reception ==
The album was released on 15 August 2004 to popular success. It also received critical praise upon its release, with Zul Husni Abdul Hamid from Berita Harian praised the album's production and content. Suzan Ahmad from Berita Minggu wrote that songs in the album "not just a loud music". Sabariah Salleh from New Sunday Times described the album "is more "raw" with a distinct Malay sound". Jad Mahidin from Sunday Mail also praised the album.

To promote the album, Cromok performs two of the 10 songs in the album live at the Sunday Nite Live in Planet Hollywood, Kuala Lumpur on 3 April 2005. The live version of Untitled, Untitled+Raw was released in May 2005, contains three raw versions of songs from their 1988 live performance in Smith St. Garage, Wollongong and three live versions of songs from their 1989 live performance in Seven Hills, Sydney, Australia.

== Track listing ==
All tracks are written by Cromok.

No.	Title	Length
1.	"I Do"	6:24
2.	"Rise"	7:18
3.	"Saviour"	6:27
4.	"On The"	6:07
5.	"Song III"	1:33
6.	"Dying To Live"	11:01
7.	"Disable"	4:29
8.	"Pip"	5:25
9.	"Untitled"	2:02
10.	"Error"	5:13
Total length:		56:03

Untitled+Raw: Live in Seven Hills, Sydney - November 1989
No.	Title	Length
11.	"Euthemia" (Live)	0:50
12.	"Journey" (Live)	5:44
13.	"Misty" (Live)	6:12

Untitled+Raw: Raw in Smith St. Garage, Wollongong - May 1988
No.	Title	Length
14.	"Merceda" (Raw)	0:33
15.	"Prophecy" (Raw)	3:38
16.	"Sanity" (Raw)	3:59

== Credits and personnel ==
The credits are adapted from the album's booklet liner notes.

Cromok

- Shamsudin Ali – vocals, bass
- Hillary Ang – guitars
- Tarmizi Mokhtar – drums

Production

- Cromok – producer, design concept
- Mohd Arzmy – executive producer
- Fauzi Omar – A&R
- Ahmad Zairi Ariffin – mixer, recorder
- AD – recorder
- Reza Wan Gafar – recorder
- CL Toh – mastering
- DB Production – artwork, photography
- King Studio – recording studios
- Mastering One – mastering studios

== Release history ==
Release history
Region	Date	Format(s)	Label	Ref.
Malaysia	15 August 2004	CD; cassette; music download; streaming	EMI Music Malaysia	
