= Mean, Meaner, Meanest =

Studio album by Cromok
- Released: 1 June 1999
- Recorded: 1991–1999
- Studio: Menora Studio (Kuala Lumpur)
- Genre: Thrash metal
- Length: 59:55
- Label: EMI Music Malaysia
- Producer: Cromok

Cromok chronology
Yours Truly (1996)	Mean, Meaner, Meanest (1999)	What's Left (2000)

Mean, Meaner, Meanest is the fourth studio album by Malaysian rock band, Cromok, released on 1 June 1999 by EMI Music Malaysia. The album contains three new songs and reissues of the band's earlier hits from their first three albums.

== Production ==
For the album, Cromok choose two tracks from their debut album Image of Purity (1991), three songs from their second album Forever in Time (1993) and the remaining four songs from their third album, Yours Truly (1996). Three new songs were recorded for the album. "Misty" and "Journey" from Image of Purity were re-recorded with new arrangements and included specially for the album. All tracks in the album were recorded at the Menora Studio in Kuala Lumpur. Cromok stated that it was meant for their fans in order for them to revisit their first three albums.

== Release and reception ==
The album was released in June 1999, with all three new songs were released as singles. It also received critical praise upon its release. Zainal Alam Kadir from New Straits Times wrote that the album "is something of a confirmation of Cromok's strength".

== Track listing ==
All tracks are written by Cromok.

No.	Title	Original album	Length
1.	"Suffer"		4:28
2.	"Journey"	Image of Purity	6:07
3.	"Eclipse"		4:57
4.	"Seeding"	Forever in Time	4:06
5.	"Final Ticking"	Yours Truly	4:40
6.	"The Other"	Forever in Time	6:01
7.	"Somewhere Anywhere"	Yours Truly	5:21
8.	"Obsessed"	Forever in Time	4:46
9.	"Maram Perapu Kepunden Param Sekeper"	Yours Truly	0:58
10.	"Memories"	Forever in Time	5:48
11.	"Stranger"	Yours Truly	5:05
12.	"Misty"	Image of Purity	5:49
13.	"Nightmare"		4:22
Total length:			59:55

== Credits and personnel ==
The credits are adapted from the album's booklet liner notes.

Cromok

- Shamsudin Ali – vocals, bass
- Khairul Anuar Shariff – guitars, keyboards, mixer
- Tarmizi Mokhtar – drums

Production

- Cromok – producer, design concept
- Mohd Arzmy – executive producer
- Fauzi Omar – A&R
- Wan – design concept
- Jig – engineer, recorder
- Saari Amri – engineer, recorder
- Ahmad Zairi Ariffin – mixer
- Is – recorder, engineer
- Menora Studios – recording studios

== Charts ==
Chart (1998–1999)	Peak position
International Albums Chart	4

== Release history ==
Release history
Region	Date	Format(s)	Label	Ref.
Malaysia	June 1, 1999	CD; cassette; music download; streaming	EMI Music Malaysia	
