= Pengemis Cinta =

Studio album by Ella
- Released: 19 January 1989
- Recorded: September – December 1988
- Studios: King Studio (Petaling Jaya, Selangor)
- Genre: Hard rock
- Length: 40:30
- Label: Warner Elektra Atlantic
- Producer: Ramli Sarip

Ella chronology
Pengemis Cinta (1989)	Puteri Kota (1990)

Singles from Pengemis Cinta
- 1. "Permata Biru" Released: 1989; 2. "Pengemis Cinta" Released: 1989

Pengemis Cinta (English: Beggars of Love) is the debut studio album by Malaysian singer, Ella, released on 19 January 1989 by Warner Elektra Atlantic. Produced by Ramli Sarip, the album, which has a ballad influences, was a commercial hit upon release, selling 100,000 copies and being certified double platinum. It also received its first official vinyl releases.

== Background ==
Ella starts her early career with the Moonracker band in her home state of Penang, later joined The Boys upon offer from the band's leader Lokman "Lord" Idris, to become its lead vocalist and the band renamed as Ella & The Boys, where she remained with the band until 1988. After the success of the band and their hit single, "Dua Insan Bercinta", Ella was approached by Warner Elektra Atlantic (WEA) in August the same year. They offered her a chance to record her first studio album. Working with Ramli Sarip, who served as the producer, she spent most of 1988 to recorded Pengemis Cinta at King Studio in Petaling Jaya, Selangor. Ella performed the vocals on all tracks and was accompanied by Wan Ahmad on guitars and keyboards, Iskandar Ismail on bass and Ridzwan "Nalin" Abdullah on drums. Backing vocals were provided by Jay Jay and Liza Aziz, both were renowned singers.

According to Ella, Pengemis Cinta has songs ranging from different genres besides of rock genre. For instance, the title track has a ballad nuances. On the album's recording process, she said: "I feel happier that I'd able to do something that I wanted all this while. I'm able to choose my own producer, that is Ramli Sarip. I feel that I'm an adult and so many things that I've learned since leaving The Boys about a year ago". The album, she said, dealt with themes such as life turbulence and introspection.

The album was released on 19 January 1989, with the songs "Permata Biru" and the title track was released as the main singles. The album was well-received, selling 100,000 copies and being certified double platinum. It also received any crticial praise upon its release. "Permata Biru" was later re-recorded by Malaysian boy band, Ruffedge for the Urban Strike compilation album, which was released in 2006 by EMI Music Malaysia and Virgin Records in collaboration with Celcom X-Pax.

== Track listing ==
No.	Title	Writer(s)	Length
1.	"Dunia Kehidupan"	Ramli Sarip	3:50
2.	"Pengemis Cinta"	Ramli Sarip, Hartina Ahmad	4:00
3.	"Permata Biru"	Suhaimie Roa	4:37
4.	"Kau Yang Pertama"	Ramli Sarip, S. Amin Shahab	4.02
5.	"Misteri Seorang Kekasih"	Ramli Sarip, S. Amin Shahab	3:18
6.	"Semarak Cinta"	Wan, Ramli Sarip, Art Fazil	4:09
7.	"Cinta Dusta"	Ramli Sarip, S. Amin Shahab	4:13
8.	"Suara Semalam"	Suhaimie Roa	4:49
9.	"Balah Telagah Apa Sudahnya"	Iskandar Ismail, A.J.	3:46
10.	"Kemudian"	Khair Yassin	4:32
Total length:			40:30

== Certifications ==
Region	Certification	Certified units/sales
Malaysia	2× Platinum	100,000

== Credits and personnel ==
Credits adapted from Pengemis Cinta booklet liner notes.

- Ella - vocals
- Jay Jay - backing vocals
- Liza Aziz - backing vocals
- Wan Ahmad - guitars, keyboards
- Iskandar Ismail - bass
- Ridzwan "Nalin" Abdullah - drums
- Ramli Sarip - producer, arranger
- Alvin Chong - recorder
- Peter Chong - recorder
- Sangkakala - arranger
- Malik of Raw Saloon - hairstylist, wardrobe
- King Studio - recording and mixing studio
- Warner Chappell Music - publisher

== Release history ==
Release history
Region	Date	Format(s)	Label	Ref.
Malaysia	January 19, 1989	CD; cassette; music download; streaming	Warner Elektra Atlantic	
