= El (Ella album) =

Studio album by Ella
- Released: 3 December 1998
- Recorded: 1996 – 1998
- Studios: Synchrosound Studio (Petaling Jaya, Selangor); Master Control (Burbank, California, United States)
- Genre: Hard rock
- Length: 63:52
- Languages: Malay; English
- Label: EMI Music Malaysia
- Producers: Paul Moss; Greg Henderson; Fauzi Marzuki; Ella; Jojie

Ella chronology
Reflexi (1997)	El (1998)	Diva Metal (2000)

Singles from El
- 1. "Bayangan" Released: 1998; 2. "Pedih" Released: 1998

Alternative cover
- Limited Edition cover

El (a short form of her stage name, Ella) is the sixth studio album by Malaysian singer, Ella, released on 3 December 1998 by EMI Music Malaysia. Two singles were released from the album. A limited edition of the album was released in 1999.

== Recording ==
Following the success of her fifth album, Ella USA (1994), which was sold 350,000 copies and being certified 6x platinum, Ella began working on a material for her next album in 1996. For the album, she and her sister Jojie become the album's producer and co-produced with Paul Moss, Greg Henderson and Fauzi Marzuki. Though majority of the songs in the album were recorded in Malay, Ella recorded three tracks in English, marking her first foray into Malaysian English music market.

Initially, she wanted to envisioned a full-length debut English album. By then, she get in touch with American singer-songwriter Richard Marx, originally to be her duet partner before the plan was scrapped. She eventually performed songs composed by Marx, entitled "World Without Your Love". Plans for her to release an English-languaged album was also was put on hold due to unknown reasons. She also re-recorded Danish rock band Michael Learns to Rock's "The Loss of a Friend" in Malay and titled as "Pedih", which was composed by the band's vocalist Jascha Richter, with lyrics written by Habsah Hassan. Songwriting was handled by A.K. Khair, who composed three songs; and Chi of OAG composed two songs, while Ella's older sister Jojie composed "Cerah Kembali", and Malaysian boy band KRU composed "I.S.A. (Ikut Suka Aku)".

El was recorded at two different studios in Malaysia and the United States, Synchrosound Studio in Petaling Jaya, Selangor and Master Control in Burbank, California, using double tracking. Ella contributed lead vocals and backing vocals on all tracks, with Zuriani, Pacai and Luke Mason provided backing vocals. In the album, Ella collaborated with Slash, guitarist of American rock band Guns N' Roses for the song "Bayangan". Regarding the album's concept, she reflected that El not too much different from Ella USA that incorporates both pop rock and hip-hop music.

"Standing in the Eyes of the World", an official anthem of the 1998 Commonwealth Games composed by David Gates and Wah Idris with lyrics by Habsah, was originally intended to be part of the album, but didn't make the final cut and was eventually excluded from the album. However, the song was included in her eighth studio album, Simbiosis, which was released five years later. She later reflected that she had mental pressure and overcome with psychology during the album's recording, while also described the album as her "manifestation of continuous struggle in music industry". El was chosen as the album title and is a short form of her stage name, Ella.

== Release and reception ==
Professional ratings
Contemporary reviews
Review scores
Source	Rating
New Straits Times	2.5/5 stars

The album was released on 3 December 1998, with "Bayangan" and "Pedih" was released as singles and received music videos. However, not long after its release, a pirated version of the album was sold openly throughout Kuala Lumpur. She was told by a friend that the pirated album was sold at a pasar malam in KL and urged fans to buy an original version of El rather than the pirated album as "the pirated cassettes and CDs are not original". Despite the controversy, the album sold well.

Upon its release, El received generally positive reviews from music critics. Zainal Alam Kadir, writing for the New Straits Times noted that the album is "a well-produced album, with loads of contemporary sounds and 'tricky' arrangements. He suggested that the album's musical style "has that Natalie Imbruglia influence at certain points"; he gave 3 1/2 stars for the album. A reviewer from Utusan Malaysia considered El as an energetic comeback for Ella.

A limited edition of the album was released in April 1999, containing only eight tracks including two minus one versions of "Pedih" and "Cekal". According to Ella, it was specially produced and released as an extended play (EP) in order to combat piracy. The album also earned her the Best Engineered Album category and nominated for the Best Rock Album category at the seventh edition of Anugerah Industri Muzik; becoming her first album to won or nominated at the award.

== Track listing ==
Standard edition
No.	Title	Writer(s)	Length
1.	"Bayangan" (feat. Slash of Guns & Roses)	Pacai, Zuriani	4:28
2.	"Pedih"	Jascha Richter, Habsah Hassan	5:18
3.	"Free"	Chi OAG	3:41
4.	"Cekal"	Zubir Ali, Fauzi Marzuki	4:17
5.	"Cerah Kembali"	Jojie, Ella	5:01
6.	"I.S.A (Ikut Suka Aku)"	KRU	3:41
7.	"Rindu Padamu"	A.K. Khair	4:41
8.	"Knowing You"	Chi OAG	3:50
9.	"Malam Ini"	A.K. Khair	4:35
10.	"Bayangan" (Slash Kaos Remix)	Pacai, Zuriani	4:28
11.	"Cinta Pertama"	A.K. Khair	4:42
12.	"Terpaku"	Lilo	4:42
13.	"World Without Your Love"	Richard Marx	4:47
14.	"Pedih" (Sing-a-long)	Jascha Richter, Habsah Hassan	5:18
Total length:			63:52

Limited edition
No.	Title	Writer(s)	Length
1.	"Bayangan"	Pacai, Zuriani	4:28
2.	"Cekal"	Zubir Ali, Fauzi Marzuki	4:17
3.	"Cerah Kembali"	Jojie, Ella	5:01
4.	"Pedih"	Jascha Richter, Habsah Hassan	5:18
5.	"Terpaku"	Lilo, Moevallo	4:48
6.	"Malam Ini"	A.K. Khair	4:35
7.	"Pedih" (minus one)	Jascha Richter	5:18
8.	"Cekal" (minus one)	Fauzi Marzuki	4:17
Total length:			42:49

== Credits and personnel ==
Credits adapted from El booklet liner notes.

- Ella - vocals, backing vocals, co-producer
- Zuriani - backing vocals
- Jamie Wilson - guitars
- Slash - lead guitars (track 1)
- Pacai - bass, backing vocals
- Luke Mason - drums, backing vocals
- Hari - keyboards
- Mac Chew - piano, strings
- Jojie - co-producer
- Mohd Arzmy - executive producer
- Paul Moss - producer (tracks 3, 8 and 13)
- Fauzi Marzuki - producer, guitars
- Greg Henderson - producer, guitars, keyboards, engineer, mixer
- Martin Horenburg - recorder (track 1)
- Adam Day - technician (guitar)
- Scott Gutares - assistant recorder
- Ikhmal Hisham - A&R
- Raja Faizal - A&R
- Rina - A&R
- Phil Shapiro - coordinator
- Dallan Cheah - assistant engineer
- Wan Kamarudin - graphics
- Wan, Neil & Alex - design concept
- Neil Duckett - photography
- Don Bartley - mastering
- Erland Kok - promotion
- Normahiran - promotion
- Shafee - promotion
- Shima - promotion (radio)
- Synchrosound Studio - recording and mixing studio
- Master control - recording studio
- Studios 301 - mastering studio

== Awards ==
Award	Year	Recipient(s) and nominee(s)	Category	Result	Ref(s)
Anugerah Industri Muzik	2000	El	Best Engineered Album	Won	
Anugerah Industri Muzik	2000	El	Best Rock Album	Nominated	

== Release history ==
Release history
Region	Date	Format(s)	Label	Ref.
Malaysia	December 3, 1998	CD; cassette; music download; streaming	EMI Music Malaysia	
