= Simbiosis =

Studio album by Ella
- Released: 30 September 2003
- Recorded: 2002 – 2003
- Studios: Synchrosound Studio (Petaling Jaya, Selangor); Nearfield Studio (Kuala Lumpur); One Zero One Studio (Petaling Jaya, Selangor)
- Genre: Hard rock
- Length: 66:38
- Label: EMI Music Malaysia
- Producers: Tarmizi "Miji" Mokhtar; Ella

Ella chronology
Puteri Rock (2002)	Simbiosis (2003)	A Journey Beyond.. the Very Best of (2005)

Singles from Simbiosis
- 1. "Simbiosis" Released: 2003

Simbiosis (English: Symbiosis) is the eighth studio album by Malaysian singer, Ella, released on 30 September 2003 by EMI Music Malaysia. Co-produced by Ella and Cromok drummer, Tarmizi Mokhtar, the album was well received.

== Production ==
In November 2001, Ella had recorded the successful album, Ilham Bicara, which sold 50,00 copies and certified platinum. Continuing the album's success, she decided to record a new album, which she considered it as "the special one", as soon as possible. She teamed up again with Cromok drummer, Tarmizi "Miji" Mokhtar (who produced Ilham Bicara album), to co-produced the album. The album's title, Simbiosis was suggested by Ajai, who composed the title track, and according to Ella, carries to mind her closeness with fans because in developing the music she incorporated. For the album, she decided to stick with older image that she was used to be during the 1990s.

Simbiosis was recorded at two recording studios in Petaling Jaya, Selangor: Synchrosound Studios and One Zero One Studios, and another recording studio in Kuala Lumpur: Nearfield Studio. Ella was joined by several professional musicians, including Edrie Hashim and Sham Kamikaze on guitars, Nasser Abu Kassim and Pacai on bass, Ujang on drums, Acis on keyboards and Fauzi Marzuki on percussion. Backing vocals were provided by Ajai, Edrie, Andy Flop Poppy and Patricia Robert. Songwriting was handled by Edrie, Ajai and Fauzi, who composed two songs respectively. Ella's younger brother, Korie composed and wrote lyrics for "Sayup-Sayup". She also wrote lyrics for "Ibu". Ajai and Mac Chew handling the arrangement.

In the album, Ella also re-recorded a cover version of traditional Malay number, "Ulek Mayang", with new arrangements by Edrie, where it had two versions, original and Radio Edit version. It also included two songs that Ella recorded earlier, namely the "Legenda 25" (previously included in the platinum edition of Ilham Bicara) as a tribute for P. Ramlee and "Standing in the Eyes of the World", which she recorded and released for the 1998 Commonwealth Games, was specially dedicated to the then-Prime Minister, Mahathir Mohamad, who retired on 31 October 2003 after 22 years in office.

== Release and reception ==
The album was released on 30 September 2003 with high sales and was well-received.

== Track listing ==
No.	Title	Writer(s)	Length
1.	"Simbiosis"	Ajai, Ad Samad	3:45
2.	"Hanya Pada Kamu"	Edrie Hashim	4:23
3.	"Terima Kasih"	Fauzi Marzuki, Loloq	4:08
4.	"Jauh"	Shah Slam	4:05
5.	"Ulek Mayang"	Copyright Controlled	7:34
6.	"Pesona"	Ajai, Kelly, Pacai	4:08
7.	"Lagenda 25"	Copyright Controlled	5:12
8.	"Sayup-Sayup"	Korie	5:47
9.	"Luka Terbisa"	Edrie Hashim	4:39
10.	"Kabus"	Fauzi Marzuki, Lukhman S.	4:37
11.	"Ibu"	Andy Flop Poppy, Ella	4:42
12.	"Kau Saja Yang Tahu"	Rez	4:50
13.	"Ulek Mayang" (Radio Edit)	Copyright Controlled	4:43
14.	"Standing in the Eyes of the World"	David Gates, Wah Idris, Habsah Hassan	4:03
Total length:			66:38
