= What's Left =

Studio album by Cromok
- Released: December 2000
- Recorded: 2000
- Studio: King Studio (Kuala Lumpur)
- Genre: Thrash metal
- Length: 48:44
- Label: EMI Music Malaysia
- Producer: Cromok

Cromok chronology
Mean, Meaner, Meanest (1999)	What's Left (2000)	Deafening Silence (2002)

What's Left is the fifth studio album by Malaysian rock band, Cromok, released on December 2000 by EMI Music Malaysia. The album was poorly received.

== Production ==
Like their previous albums, all songs in the album were written by the band's vocalist and bassist, Sam. Recording of the album was done mainly at the King Studio in Kuala Lumpur. What's Left would be Cromok's first album with its new guitarist, Hillary Ang from Search, following the departure of its original guitarist Karl, who leave the band prior to the album's release, due to his family and work commitments.

== Release and reception ==
The album was released in December 2000, but was poorly received and its sales were lackluster. Despite its poor sales, the album received positive reviews. Zainal Alam Kadir from New Straits Times gave four out of five stars and wrote that the album is the band's "more structured piece of work" and is "not as dark or gloomy as the band's previous efforts, which were more raw and naive", while Harian Metro's Saniboey Mohd Ismail also praised the album.

The music video for "Crossed" was produced, marking the first time in the band's career, they produce a music video for any of their songs.

== Track listing ==
All tracks are written by Cromok.

No.	Title	Length
1.	"Crossed"	4:54
2.	"Limit"	5:17
3.	"Rival - Siblings II"	6:21
4.	"The Gift"	3:08
5.	"Loser"	4:48
6.	"Shadowplay"	6:37
7.	"Modern"	5:15
8.	"Never Be Mine"	4:17
9.	"Believe"	4:08
10.	"Hunter & Hunted"	4:53
Total length:		48:44

== Credits and personnel ==
The credits are adapted from the album's booklet liner notes.

Cromok

- Shamsudin Ali – vocals, bass
- Hillary Ang – guitars
- Tarmizi Mokhtar – drums

Production

- Cromok – producer, design concept
- Mohd Arzmy – executive producer
- Fauzi Omar – A&R
- Ahmad Zairi Ariffin – mixer, recorder
- AD – recorder
- Reza Wan Gafar – recorder
- CL Toh – mastering
- DB Production – artwork, photography
- King Studio – recording studios
- Mastering One – mastering studios

== Release history ==
Release history
Region	Date	Format(s)	Label	Ref.
Malaysia	December 2000	CD; cassette; music download; streaming	EMI Music Malaysia	
