= Konsert Ella USA =

1994 concert tour by Ella

- Tour by Ella
- Associated album: Ella USA
- Start date: 18 March 1994
- End date: 30 August 1994
- No. of shows: 30

Ella concert chronology
- Konsert Ella Singapura (1993); Konsert Ella USA (1994); Konsert Ella 8494 (1995)

Konsert Ella USA was a concert tour by Malaysian singer Ella in support of her fifth studio album Ella USA. Sponsored by Salem, the tour was originally scheduled for 40 locations across Malaysia. It began in Alor Setar, Kedah, on 18 March and concluded on 30 August 1994 in Lumut, Perak. The set list featured songs primarily from the Ella USA album, along with selections from her previous albums.

== Background ==
On 5 February 1994, Ella released her studio album Ella USA. To promote the album, she announced a tour titled Konsert Ella USA, her second headlining concert tour following Konsert Ella 30110 in 1992. The tour was initially scheduled to cover 40 locations nationwide over a six-month period but was later reduced to 30 concerts.

For the tour, Ella purchased musical equipment worth more than RM200,000 from the United States, while the production cost per concert was estimated at RM2.7 million. She also flew her backing musicians to the United States for training with local musicians. In support of the Malaysian government's "caring society" campaign, she collaborated with the Ministry of National Unity and Community Development, donating RM1 from every ticket sold to the National Welfare Foundation of Malaysia.

As part of the promotion, Ella used a helicopter displaying a banner reading "Caring Society Campaign with Ella USA", which flew over the Klang Valley, Selangor. This made her the first Malaysian artist to promote a concert in such a manner. American cigarette brand Salem became the tour's main sponsor.

== Concert synopsis ==
Ella opened the concert with a series of pop rock songs, beginning with "Ala Amerika", followed by "Risau", "Nuri", and "Mungkin". She then transitioned into a set of sentimental songs, including "Menanti", "Dua Insan Bercinta", and "Rindu".

She was accompanied by her backing vocalists, Sarah and Korie. Ella later continued the concert with popular hits such as "Kesal" and "Bolero".

== Critical reception ==
The concert received generally positive reviews from critics and the media. A review in Berita Harian Singapore praised Ella's energetic performance and strong vocals during her Johor Bahru concert but noted a slight drop in energy during slower songs and commented on her stage wardrobe.

V. Sivaji of the New Straits Times described Ella's performance in Ipoh as energetic and entertaining, reaffirming her status as one of Malaysia's top entertainers.

== Commercial performance ==
The concert tour was a commercial success. The show in Butterworth, Penang, was attended by 15,000 people, while the performance at MBJB Indoor Stadium in Johor Bahru attracted 8,000 attendees.

== Set list ==
The set list is adapted from a concert in MBJB Indoor Stadium, Johor Bahru. (Note: The list is currently incomplete.)

1. "Ala Amerika"
2. "Risau"
3. "Nuri"
4. "Mungkin"
5. "Menanti"
6. "Dua Insan Bercinta"
7. "Rindu"
8. "Kesal"
9. "Bolero"

== Controversies ==
The Ella USA tour faced several controversies throughout its nationwide run in 1994.

On 18 May 1994, Salem was banned by the Malaysian government from sponsoring stage performances in Malaysia, leading the brand to terminate contracts with affected artists, including Ella, forcing her to seek a new sponsor.

On 29 May 1994, the Kuala Kangsar District Council cancelled the Ella USA concert at Dataran Pinggir Sungai Perak, Kuala Kangsar, Perak without prior announcement, resulting in losses for about 30 food and beverage vendors in the area.

Despite these setbacks, the tour continued at Darul Aman Public Field, Jitra, Kedah on 16 July 1994 without a sponsor, with ticket prices subsequently increased.

However, the concert scheduled at Kulim Public Field, Kulim, Kedah on 6 August 1994 was cancelled by the Kulim District Council following peaceful protests by local residents, leaving nearly 1,000 attendees disappointed. Ella later issued an apology, stating that the performance permit had been withdrawn at the last minute.

The tour also experienced a minor incident during the Pesta Laut Lumut 1994 concert at Teluk Batik, Lumut, Perak on 30 August 1994, when several audience members reportedly became involved in fights after becoming overly excited during the performance.

== Tour dates ==
List of concerts, showing date, city, venue, and attendance. (Note: The list is currently incomplete.) (Note: Changes to the date, venue, time, or concert cancellations may occur.)
| Date | City | Venue | Attendance | Notes | Ref. |
|---|---|---|---|---|---|
| 18 March 1994 | Alor Setar, Kedah | Tapak Pesta, Jalan Teluk Wan Jah | — | | |
| 26 March 1994 | Ipoh, Perak | Tapak Medan Gopeng | 9,000 | | |
| 3 April 1994 | Butterworth, Penang | Tapak Ekspo Seberang Jaya | 15,000 | | |
| 8 April 1994 | Johor Bahru, Johor | MBJB Indoor Stadium | 8,000 | | |
| 1 May 1994 | Batu Pahat, Johor | Taman Tasik Merdeka | 9,000 | | |
| 15 May 1994 | Banting, Selangor | Jugra Stadium | — | | |
| 25 May 1994 | Kuantan, Pahang | Kuantan City Council Field | — | | |
| 29 May 1994 | Kuala Kangsar, Perak | Dataran Pinggir Sungai Perak | — | Cancelled | |
| 3 June 1994 | Shah Alam, Selangor | Tapak Ekspo, Seksyen 15 | — | | |
| 16 July 1994 | Jitra, Kedah | Darul Aman Public Field | — | | |
| 6 August 1994 | Kulim, Kedah | Kulim Public Field | — | Cancelled | |
| 30 August 1994 | Lumut, Perak | Teluk Batik | — | | |
