= Holy Expedition =

Live album by Bow Wow
- Released: July 21, 1983
- Recorded: May 9, 1983
- Venue: The Marquee, London, UK
- Genre: Heavy metal
- Length: 42:19
- Label: Vap (Japan); Heavy Metal Worldwide (UK); Roadrunner (Europe)
- Producer: Bow Wow

Bow Wow chronology
Warning from Stardust (1982)	Holy Expedition (1983)	Beat of Metal Motion (1984)

Professional ratings
Review scores
Source	Rating
Collector's Guide to Heavy Metal	5/10
Metal Forces	5/10

Holy Expedition is the second live album by Japanese heavy metal band Bow Wow.

== Track listing ==
Side one

1. "Getting Back on the Road" - 5:05
2. "You're Mine" - 3:37
3. "Touch Me, I'm on Fire" - 4:57
4. "Can't Get Back to You" - 9:18

Side two

5. "Don't Cry Baby" - 4:00
6. "20th Century Child" - 4:45
7. "Devil Woman" - 3:33
8. "Theme of Bow Wow" - 7:00

== Personnel ==
- Kyoji Yamamoto - guitars, vocals
- Mitsuhiro Saito - guitars, vocals
- Kenji Sano - bass guitars, backing vocals, crazy voice
- Toshihiro Niimi - drums, backing vocals

== See also ==
- 1983 in Japanese music
