= Yours Truly (Cromok album) =

Studio album by Cromok
- Released: November 25, 1996
- Recorded: 1994–1996
- Studio: King Studio (Kuala Lumpur)
- Genre: Thrash metal
- Length: 49:07
- Label: EMI Music Malaysia
- Producer: Cromok

Cromok chronology
Forever in Time (1993)	Yours Truly (1996)	Mean, Meaner, Meanest (1999)

Yours Truly is the third studio album by Malaysian rock band, Cromok, released on 25 November 1996 by EMI Music Malaysia.

== Production ==
Yours Truly was heavily influenced by Cromok. Like their previous albums, Cromok served as the album producer with Karl, the band's guitarist, served as the mixer, while also utilized Malay cultural elements in all tracks.

Unlike their first two albums, which has 6 and 8 songs respectively, the album contains 10 songs, including the album's shortest track titled "Maram Perapu Kepunden Paran Sekeper", with its running time of 58 seconds. The album was recorded primarily in King Studio in Kuala Lumpur. The mastering process was done by Oscar Gaona at the Studios 301 in Sydney, Australia.

== Release and reception ==
The album was released on 25 November 1996 and was well-received, selling 27,000 copies. As with Forever in Time (1993), some of the tracks in Yours Truly were not approved for broadcast on Radio Televisyen Malaysia (RTM).

== Track listing ==
All tracks are written by Cromok.

No.	Title	Length
1.	"Siblings"	6:37
2.	"Stranger"	5:05
3.	"IC"	6:33
4.	"Maram Perapu Kepunden Paran Sekeper"	0:58
5.	"Castaway"	5:10
6.	"Punishment Hour"	4:20
7.	"Farewell"	4:27
8.	"Final Ticking"	4:39
9.	"Little One"	5:58
10.	"Somewhere Anywhere"	5:20
Total length:		49:07

== Credits and personnel ==
The credits are adapted from the album's booklet liner notes.

Cromok

- Shamsudin Ali – vocals, bass
- Khairul Anuar Shariff – guitars, keyboards, mixer
- Tarmizi Mokhtar – drums

Production

- Cromok – producer
- Mohd Arzmy – executive producer
- Fauzi Omar – A&R, reissue producer
- Ahmad Zairi Ariffin – mixer, recorder
- AD – recorder
- Reza Wan Gafar – recorder
- Oscar Gaona – mastering
- D'Atok Akeem – remastering
- DB Production – artwork, photography
- King Studio – recording studio
- Studios 301 – mastering studio
- Otai Art Studio – remastering studio

== Release history ==
Release history
Region	Date	Format(s)	Label	Ref.
Malaysia	November 25, 1996	CD; cassette; music download; streaming	EMI Music Malaysia	
