= King or Queen =

King or Queen may refer to:

- Monarch, the sovereign head of state in a monarchy
- King or Queen, single by Bow Wow in 2014
- "King or Queen", song by Kylie Minogue from X
