= Puteri Kota =

Studio album by Ella
- Released: 22 January 1990
- Recorded: 1989
- Studios: King Studio (Petaling Jaya, Selangor)
- Genre: Hard rock
- Length: 41:40
- Label: Warner Elektra Atlantic
- Producer: Ramli Sarip

Ella chronology
Pengemis Cinta (1989)	Puteri Kota (1990)	Identiti (1990)

Singles from Puteri Kota
- 1. "Puteri Kota" Released: 1990; 2. "Tiada Tangis Lagi" Released: 1990

Puteri Kota (English: Princess of the City) is the second studio album by Malaysian singer, Ella, released on 22 January 1990 by Warner Elektra Atlantic. Recorded with much input from Ramli Sarip, the album was a commercial hit upon release, selling 150,000 copies and being certified triple platinum. It is one of her two studio albums that released in 1990, the other being her third studio album, Identiti.

== Production ==
Puteri Kota was Ella's second album, which was highly anticipated following the massive success of her debut album Pengemis Cinta, which was sold 100,000 copies and received double platinum certifications. Ramli Sarip, who produced her debut album Pengemis Cinta, served as the producer and composed five songs. Ella later recalled receiving much support from Ramli during the recording of Puteri Kota.

The album was recorded primarily at King Studio in Petaling Jaya, Selangor and took three months to completed. It featured Ella on lead vocals, Wan Ahmad on guitars and keyboards, Jay Jay and Amran "Yan" Marsiman on bass, Ridzuan "Nalin" Abdullah on drums and Azmi on saxophone. For the album, Ella blended the elements of rock n' roll, slow rock, funk rock and ballad blues as she expected it to be "successful as her previous ones". The album was named to referring a 'title' she earned being one of the few female singers that performs rock music.

== Release and reception ==
The album was released on 22 January 1990 with the title track and "Tiada Tangis Lagi" was released as the main singles. A music video was produced for the title track and premiered for the first time on MTV's Down to Earth in the United States. The album was well received, sold 150,000 copies and being certified triple platinum.

Saleha Ali, writing for New Straits Times, found the album "is another album for rockers". She suggests that the title track "takes on a more up-tempo beat". Three of the 10 songs in the album, "Puteri Kota", "Tiada Tangis Lagi" and "Kembara Kita" were selected for inclusion in the 1991 film, Bayangan Maut (The Shadows of Death), directed by Yusof Haslam, starring Ella in her acting debut.

== Track listing ==
No.	Title	Writer(s)	Length
1.	"Puteri Kota"	Suhaime Roa	3:58
2.	"Tiada Tangis Lagi"	Moro	3:28
3.	"Aku Tetap Wanita"	Ramli Sarip, Bob Lokman	4:00
4.	"Sangkar Kerinduan"	Yan, Nasir Jani	4:30
5.	"Dalam Kehidupan"	Ramli Sarip	4:45
6.	"Kembara Kita"	Ramli Sarip, Dr. Wan Zawawi	3:48
7.	"Ku Penanti Setia"	Ramli Sarip, Hartina Ahmad	4:30
8.	"Pohon Cinta"	Art Fazil	3:48
9.	"Di Percintaan Itu"	Wan, Bob Lokman	4:30
10.	"Cinta Mawar Putih"	Ramli Sarip, Usop	4:00
Total length:			41:40

== Certifications ==
Region	Certification	Certified units/sales
Malaysia	3× Platinum	150,000

== Credits and personnel ==
Credits adapted from Puteri Kota booklet liner notes.

- Ella - vocals
- Wan Ahmad - guitars, keyboards
- Jay Jay - bass
- Amran "Yan" Marsiman - bass
- Ridzwan "Nalin" Abdullah - drums
- Azmi - saxophone
- Ramli Sarip - producer, arranger
- Peter Chong - mixer
- Jackie - arranger
- Design Image - artwork design, photography
- King Studio - recording and mixing studio
- Warner Chappell Music - publisher

== Release history ==
Release history
Region	Date	Format(s)	Label	Ref.
Malaysia	January 22, 1990	CD; cassette; music download; streaming	Warner Elektra Atlantic	
