= Forever in Time =

Studio album by Cromok
- Released: February 15, 1993
- Recorded: 1992–1993
- Studio: King Studio (Kuala Lumpur)
- Genre: Thrash metal
- Length: 38:58
- Label: EMI Music Malaysia
- Producer: Cromok

Cromok chronology
Image of Purity (1991)	Forever in Time (1993)	Yours Truly (1996)

Forever in Time is the second studio album by Malaysian rock band, Cromok, released on 15 February 1993 by EMI Music Malaysia. The album, which had both Malay and Nusantara influences, was well-received.

== Production ==
Forever in Time was the second long-player release from Cromok, which was highly anticipated after the success of their first album Image of Purity (1991), which was well-received by the market and being certified platinum. The album is the band's first studio album with EMI Music Malaysia after having previously been signed to Valentine Sound Productions (VSP).

Recording of Forever in Time began in June 1992 and was done primarily at the King Studio in Kuala Lumpur, where the band spent RM40,000 to financed the album and spent their time to record all tracks in the album for 100 hours. Like Image of Purity, the band members composed all tracks, including two instrumentals, in the album and incorporates both extreme and classical metal sounds.

In the album, there is a song called "I Don't Belong Here", which is an instrumental song, was quite popular among many people because of its soothing ballads. According to the band's guitarist Karl, the song has a sentimental values for himself and it comes from his experience of spending seven years in Australia to pursue audio engineering at the University of Wollongong. Karl said about the song: "[The song] is very special for me because it tells us that we have emotions and feelings during life in Australia and also in Malaysia".

== Artwork ==
The cover art photography was designed and illustrated by Amer Surealy with photography done by Artier. It features a mechanical and cyborg-styled unicorn head with a Roman clock and lightning bolt.

== Release and reception ==
Forever in Time was released on 15 February 1993 and was well-received, selling 50,000 copies and being certified platinum. However, not long after its release, all 8 songs in the album were not approved for broadcast on Radio Televisyen Malaysia (RTM).

As of 1997, Forever in Time was sold 60,000 copies, and its sales were increased to 100,000 copies in 2005. It also have been released in a vinyl to mark its 25th anniversary in 2018, remastered by d'Atok Akeem at Otai Art Studio and distributed by PMP Entertainment.

== Track listing ==
All tracks are written by Cromok.

No.	Title	Length
1.	"Memories"	5:48
2.	"Colour of Truth"	3:26
3.	"Seeding"	4:08
4.	"I Don't Belong Here"	6:00
5.	"Obsessed"	4:39
6.	"Misery"	5:06
7.	"The Other"	6:08
8.	"Another You"	4:33
Total length:		38:58

== Credits and personnel ==
The credits are adapted from the album's booklet liner notes.

Cromok

- Shamsudin Ali – vocals, bass
- Khairul Anuar Shariff – guitars, keyboards, mixer
- Tarmizi Mokhtar – drums

Production

- Cromok – producer
- Mohd Arzmy – executive producer
- Ikhmal – executive producer
- Mike Bloemendal – mixer
- Kamal – recorder
- Ron – recorder
- Jackie – recorder, mixer
- Amer Surealy – cover illustration, design
- Artier – photography
- d'Atok Akeem – remastering
- King Studio – recording studio
- Capitol Studios – mastering studio
- Otai Art Studio – remastering studio

== Certifications ==
Region	Certification	Certified units/sales
Malaysia	Platinum	50,000

== Release history ==
Release history
Region	Date	Format(s)	Label	Ref.
Malaysia	February 15, 1993	CD; cassette; music download; streaming	EMI Music Malaysia	
