= Deafening Silence =

Studio album by Cromok
- Released: 14 June 2002
- Recorded: 2001–2002
- Studio: King Studio (Kuala Lumpur)
- Genre: Thrash metal
- Length: 52:17
- Label: EMI Music Malaysia
- Producer: Cromok

Cromok chronology
What's Left (2000)	Deafening Silence (2002)	Engraved in Eternity (2003)

Deafening Silence is the sixth studio album by Malaysian rock band, Cromok, released on 14 June 2002 by EMI Music Malaysia.

== Production ==
Deafening Silence was heavily influenced by Cromok. The band spent late 2001 and early 2002 to record all tracks in the album, with songwriting was handled by any of the band members. Of all 13 tracks in the album, "Preface" and "Appendix" features spoken words, whereas "Who Cares What You Think" is an instrumental. Recording of the album was done mainly at the King Studio in Kuala Lumpur and mastered by CL Toh at Mastering One in Petaling Jaya, Selangor.

== Release and reception ==
The album was released in 14 June 2002, but was poorly received and its sales were lackluster as their fifth album, What's Left. The album, however, received crtitical praise upon its release. Zainal Alam Kadir from the New Straits Times described the album is "strange enough" and "sounds more like the earlier Cromok effort than the last album".

== Track listing ==
All tracks are written by Cromok.

No.	Title	Length
1.	"Preface"	0:21
2.	"Enough"	4:44
3.	"Reminder For The Remainder"	4:51
4.	"Whisper"	5:38
5.	"Chapter IV"	0:07
6.	"Struggle"	5:50
7.	"Who Cares What You Think"	4:43
8.	"Resemblance (Rival II)"	6:53
9.	"Frontliner"	4:11
10.	"Turning Point"	4:38
11.	"Dream On"	4:26
12.	"Disturbed Mentality"	5:30
13.	"Appendix"	0:25
Total length:		52:17

== Credits and personnel ==
The credits are adapted from the album's booklet liner notes.

Cromok

- Shamsudin Ali – vocals, bass
- Hillary Ang – guitars
- Tarmizi Mokhtar – drums

Production

- Cromok – producer, design concept
- Mohd Arzmy – executive producer
- Fauzi Omar – A&R
- Ahmad Zairi Ariffin – mixer, recorder
- AD – recorder
- Reza Wan Gafar – recorder
- CL Toh – mastering
- DB Production – artwork, photography
- King Studio – recording studios
- Mastering One – mastering studios

== Release history ==
Release history
Region	Date	Format(s)	Label	Ref.
Malaysia	14 June 2002	CD; cassette; music download; streaming	EMI Music Malaysia	
