= Identiti =

Studio album by Ella
- Released: 30 November 1990
- Recorded: 1990
- Studios: King Studio (Petaling Jaya, Selangor); Scat Studio (Kuala Lumpur)
- Genre: Hard rock
- Length: 48:09
- Label: Warner Elektra Atlantic
- Producers: Ramli Sarip; M. Nasir

Ella chronology
Puteri Kota (1990)	Identiti (1990)	Ella Mood (1991)

Singles from Identiti
- 1. "Sepi Sekuntum Mawar Merah" Released: 1990

Identiti (English: Identity) is the third studio album by Malaysian singer, Ella, released on 30 November 1990 by Warner Elektra Atlantic. Co-produced by Ramli Sarip and M. Nasir, the album was a commercial hit upon release, selling 200,000 copies and being certified triple platinum. It is one of her two studio albums that released in 1990, the other being her second studio album, Puteri Kota. It also was released in Indonesia as Berlayar Tak Bertepian.

== Production ==
Continuing the success of her first two albums, which was a commercial hits and received double and triple platinum certifications, Ella began collecting material for her third album, which entitled as Identiti. For the album, she approached M. Nasir to become the producer while retaining her collaboration with Ramli Sarip. Songwriting was handled by Ramli, who composed four songs, while Nasir composed two songs and Fauzi Marzuki composed the remaining two. Arrangements were also handled by Ramli for most of the tracks, while Nasir and Fauzi handles arrangement for two songs respectively.

Ella said about her collaboration with Ramli and Nasir: "Here, you can see the result. The most successful combination of composers making Identiti made possible". The album was recorded in two different studios, namely King Studio in Petaling Jaya, Selangor, and Scat Studio in Kuala Lumpur. Identiti would be Ella's last studio album with WEA and she was later signed to EMI Music Malaysia afterwards.

== Release and reception ==
The album was released on 30 November 1990, with "Sepi Sekuntum Mawar Merah" became the only single. The song also earned Ella to compete at the 1991 Juara Lagu song contest and succeed to entered the competition's finale. It was a critical and commercial success, selling 200,000 copies and being certified triple platinum. In Singapore, the album was sold 10,000 copies.

"Sepi Sekuntum Mawar Merah" was later re-recorded by Malaysian boy band, V.E. for the Urban Strike compilation album, while "Kasih" was later re-recorded by Malaysian hip-hop group, Phlowtron for the same compilation, which was released in 2006 by EMI Music Malaysia and Virgin Records in collaboration with Celcom X-Pax. For the album's Indonesian market, it was retitled as Berlayar Tak Bertepian, produced and released by Musica Studios.

== Track listing ==
No.	Title	Writer(s)	Length
1.	"Prinsip"	Ramli Sarip, Nasir Jani	4:00
2.	"Kasih"	Ramli Sarip, Bob Lokman	5:40
3.	"Di Perlumbaan Ini"	Fauzi Marzuki, Lukhman S.	5:58
4.	"Sepi Sekuntum Mawar Merah"	Fauzi Marzuki, Lukhman S.	4:35
5.	"Anak Patung"	Art Fazil	3:23
6.	"Terminal Cinta"	Ramli Sarip, Hartina Ahmad	5:16
7.	"Hati Di Padu"	M. Nasir, Loloq	4:40
8.	"Cinta Selembut Sutera"	M. Nasir	5:36
9.	"Butiran"	Suhaime Roa	3:08
10.	"21 Lilin"	Ramli Sarip	5:05
Total length:			48:09

== Certifications ==
Region	Certification	Certified units/sales
Malaysia	3× Platinum	200,000

== Credits and personnel ==
Credits adapted from Identiti booklet liner notes.

- Ella - vocals
- Ramli Sarip - producer, arranger
- M. Nasir - producer, arranger
- Fauzi Marzuki - arranger
- Peter Chong - mixer
- Ron Chong - recorder
- Mustafa "Tapa" Hidzir - design concept
- Jen Studio - photography
- King Studio - recording studio
- Scat Studio - recording studio

== Release history ==
Release history
Region	Date	Format(s)	Label	Ref.
Malaysia	November 30, 1990	CD; cassette; music download; streaming	Warner Elektra Atlantic	
