= Ella USA =

Studio album by Ella
- Released: February 5, 1994
- Recorded: November 1993 - December 1993
- Studios: A&M Studios (Hollywood, Los Angeles); The Enterprise (Burbank, Los Angeles); Kingsound Studios (North Hollywood, Los Angeles); Can-Am Recorders (Tarzana, Los Angeles)
- Genres: Hard rock; Pop rock
- Length: 68:26
- Label: EMI Music Malaysia
- Producers: Ella; Kyoji Yamamoto; M. Nasir

Ella chronology
Ella 100% Remix (1993)	Ella USA (1994)	8494 (1995)

Singles from Ella USA
- 1. "P.P.P" Released: 1994; 2. "Gemilang" Released: 1994; 3. "Nuri" Released: 1994

Ella USA (an abbreviation of Ella Unik Syuga Asli; English: Ella Unique Refine Original) is the fifth studio album by Malaysian singer Ella, released on 5 February 1994 by EMI Music Malaysia. Recorded in collaboration with Kyoji Yamamoto and M. Nasir, the album became one of the best-selling Malaysian albums of all time. In 2021, Harian Metro listed it as one of the 10 best Malaysian album of all time.

== Background ==
In March 1992, Ella released her fourth album, 30110. The album became a massive success, earning a five-times platinum certification after selling more than 250,000 units by December 1992. Its singles, including "Sembilu" and "Layar Impian", became chart-topping hits across Malaysia. Following this success, EMI Music Malaysia decided to work on Ella's next album, aiming to surpass 30110 with higher production costs and an overseas recording process.

== Recording and production ==
=== Recording ===
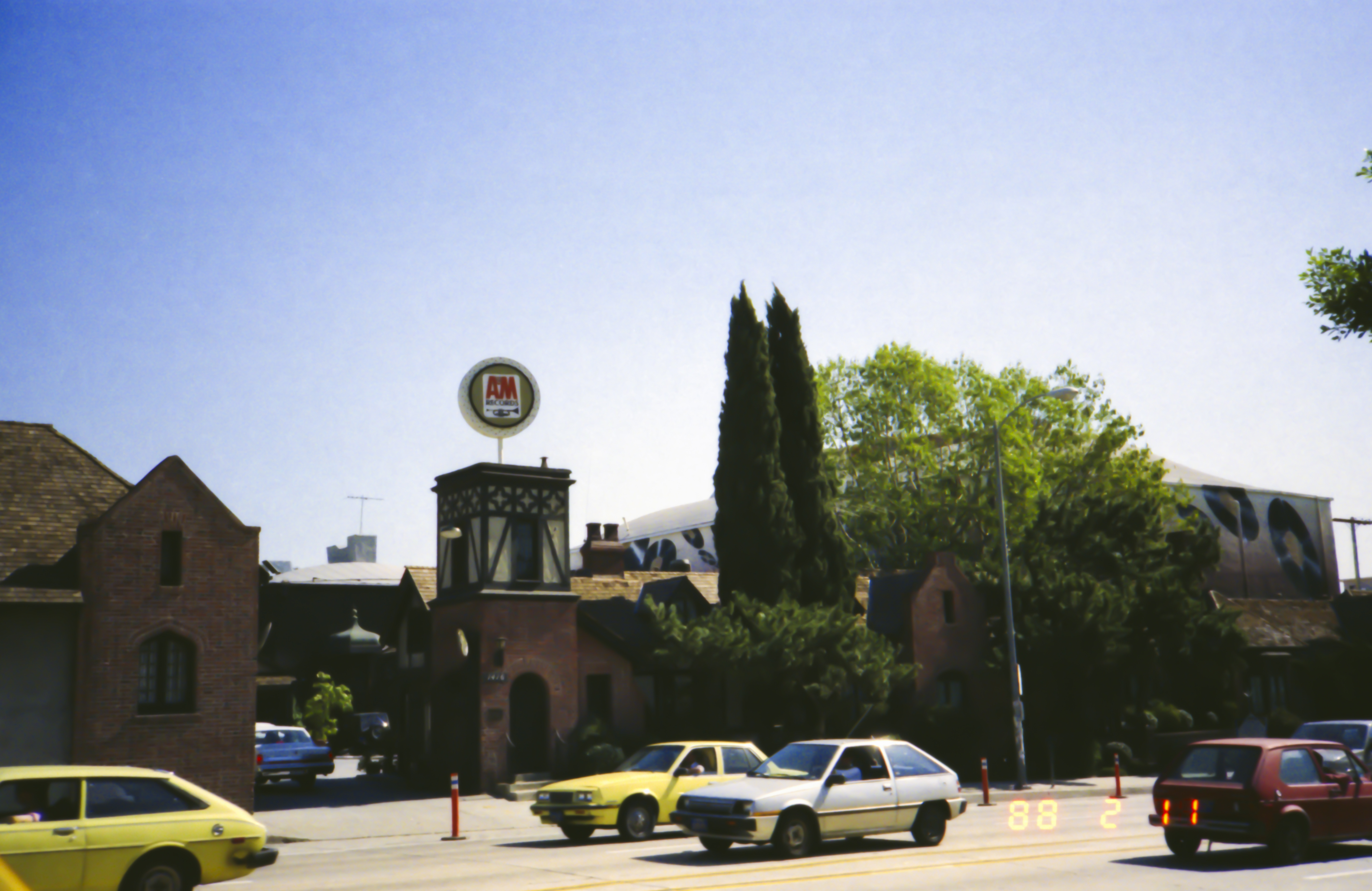
A&M Studios, Los Angeles, where Ella recorded the Ella USA album.

Ella teamed up with Japanese guitarist Kyoji Yamamoto of Japanese heavy metal band Bow Wow to co-produce the album. Their collaboration began in 1992, when Yamamoto and his band joined a promotional tour for Ella's album 30110 across Japan.

Pre-production for Ella USA took place at Ella Studio, Booty Studio Production in Kuala Lumpur, and Studio Ronggeng Luncai Emas in Selangor, before they travelled to Los Angeles, United States, on 21 November 1993 for the main recording phase. The album was recorded at four studios in Los Angeles: A&M Studios, The Enterprise, Kingsound Studios, and Can-Am Recorders.

Ella was supported by professional session musicians, including Kyoji Yamamoto on guitar, Randy Kerber on keyboards, Neil Stubenhaus on bass, Eric Moon on keyboards, John Robinson on drums, Michael Thompson on guitar, Jonathan Melvoin on drum and John Pierce of the American rock band Toto on bass. Recording sessions lasted up to 12 hours per day to complete a total of 12 tracks. The rest of the album's recording was completed in 23 days between late November to 16 December 1993. The album was recorded and mixed by Bill Drescher, Martin Horenburg and Phil Kaffel. The mastering process was done by Stephen Marcussen at Precision Mastering in Los Angeles in January 1994. Following a 62-day stay in the United States, Ella returned to Malaysia in late January 1994.

=== Music ===
Ella USA retains a rock-oriented concept, incorporating styles such as pop rock, hard rock, rock ballads, rock and roll, and country western. Most songs on the album were written and composed by Ella and Kyoji Yamamoto. Malaysian singer-songwriter M. Nasir produced and co-wrote the rock ballad "Menanti". Other songwriters involved include Yusry of KRU, Korie, Eric Moon, Salman Shariff, Loloq, and Hamid of Metallian.

=== Cover ===
The album photography was taken by American photographer Nels Israelson, who has also worked with artists such as Def Leppard, Red Hot Chili Peppers, and Blur. Unlike Ella's previous albums, the title of Ella USA was decided before the album's completion. The acronym "USA" stands for Unik (Unique), Syuga (Refine), and Asli (Original), with "Syuga" is derived from a Japanese term. EMI Music Malaysia also held a logo design competition for the album, with a prize of RM5,000 for the winner.

=== Northridge earthquake ===
On 17 January 1994, the Northridge earthquake struck Greater Los Angeles during Ella's stay in the city for the recording of Ella USA. At the time, Ella, her sister, and her manager were residing at the Oakwood Apartment, Toluca Hills, Hollywood. The apartment was located about 30 minutes from the earthquake's epicenter in the San Fernando Valley. The earthquake had a magnitude of 6.7 and lasted about a minute. In an interview with the New Straits Times, Ella described the experience as terrifying, recalling that the building shook violently and made it difficult for her to stand. They evacuated the building unharmed and later moved to another residence near Orange County.

== Release and commercial reception ==
Ella USA was released on 5 February 1994 through EMI Music Malaysia. The album was well received upon release and sold over 280,000 copies within two months. By July 1994, it had sold over 300,000 copies, and by 1998 total sales had exceeded 350,000 copies. The album became one of the best-selling Malaysian albums of all time.

=== Singles ===
Three singles were released from Ella USA. The first, "P.P.P" (Permata Pemotong Permata), is a hard rock song composed by Yusry of Malaysian boy band KRU, with lyrics written by Malaysian lyricist Loloq. The title translates as "diamond cuts diamond", referring to a contest between equally matched individuals

The second single, "Gemilang", is a rock ballad composed by Kyoji Yamamoto with lyrics by Ella. The song was selected as the most popular song of June 1994 in a nationwide listener poll organised by Radio Tiga, Radio Televisyen Malaysia.

The third single, "Nuri", is a hard rock song composed by Ella and Hamid of Malaysian rock band Metallian, with lyrics written by Loloq.

=== Music video ===
The music video for "Rindu" was filmed on 22 December 1993 at Bear Mountain Ski Resort, San Bernardino, California. The ski area is located at an elevation of approximately 2,200 metres above sea level. The video was shot by American cinematographer Andy Sobkovich and was completed in two hours.

The music video for "Ala Amerika" was filmed in Las Vegas, Nevada on 22 December 1993. It shows Ella singing inside a moving convertible car through the city streets, interspersed with scenes of local scenery and daily life.

The "Maafkanlah" music video was originally planned to be filmed on 22 December at Hoover Dam, Flagstaff, Arizona but was cancelled due to Ella's fatigue and cold weather conditions.

The music videos for "P.P.P", "Maafkanlah", and "Nuri" were filmed at the Grand Canyon in Arizona on 23 December 1993. "P.P.P" and "Nuri" music video show Ella and her musicians performing on top of the cliffs at an elevation of approximately 2,300 metres. All three music video shoots were completed within 10 hours.

The music video for "Aku Kau Dia" was filmed in San Francisco. It shows Ella walking through the city's streets, with various notable landmarks in the background.

The music video for "Penawar" was filmed in late April 1994 at Rumah Seri Kenangan in Cheras, Selangor. It was produced to support the "caring society" campaign by the Ministry of National Unity and Community Development .The video depicts Ella visiting and spending time at an elderly care home.

== Promotion and charity ==
=== Promotion ===
Ella supported the album with the Konsert Ella USA, which ran from March 1994 to August 1994. The concert tour was scheduled across 40 locations throughout Malaysia. As part of the promotion, EMI Music Malaysia used a helicopter displaying promotional material for the album, which flew across the Klang Valley, Selangor. In addition, Canon released an Ella USA Calculator as part of its marketing collaboration with Ella, who served as a spokesperson for Canon Malaysia. A telepromo service was also introduced, allowing fans to call a dedicated telephone number advertised in newspapers to listen to songs and obtain album information, with standard call charges applied.

=== Charity ===
During the promotion of Ella USA, Ella and EMI Music Malaysia contributed RM100,001 to the National Welfare Foundation of Malaysia to support government "caring society" campaign. The donation was presented to the Minister of National Unity and Community Development, Datuk Napsiah Omar. The contribution came from royalties of the song Esok, Lusa Selamanya, sales of Ella USA, and ticket sales from Konsert Ella USA. Ella also demonstrated her support for people with disabilities by donating RM10,000 to the Disabled Arts Fund through her company, Ella Production.

== Critical reception ==
Professional ratings
Contemporary reviews
Review scores
Source	Rating
New Straits Times	3/4 stars

Upon its release, Ella USA received generally positive reviews from music critics. Writing for Harian Metro, Roslen Fadzil described the album as a "killer album" overall, highlighting its strong musical impact. In The Malay Mail, Siti Nurbaiyah praised the album as a "touch of pure magic" in Ella's latest effort. Suraya Al-Attas of New Straits Times praised the album's production and improved instrumentation, particularly the guitar work by Kyoji Yamamoto, while noting that its material remained similar to Ella's previous releases.

== Legacy ==
For the 30th anniversary of Ella USA, Ella staged the Ella USA 30th Anniversary Concert at Arena of Stars, Resorts World Genting on 17 May 2025. She performed 20 songs during the two-hour concert. Japanese guitarist Kyoji Yamamoto reunited with Ella for the concert, which was attended by more than 4,200 fans.

"Gemilang", the album's second single, was later re-recorded by Malaysian boy band, Ruffedge for the Urban Strike compilation album, which was released in 2006 by EMI Music Malaysia and Virgin Records in collaboration with Celcom X-Pax. Ella USA remains one of the best-selling albums by a Malaysian female artist and continues to be regarded as one of her most significant releases. In 2021, Harian Metro selected the album (and 30110) as the 2nd best Malaysian album of all time, the highest ranked of Ella's two solo albums on the list.

== Track listing ==
All tracks are written by Kyoji Yamamoto and Ella except where noted.

No.	Title	Writer(s)	Length
1.	"Menanti"	M. Nasir; Eric Moon; Ella; Loloq	5:27
2.	"P.P.P."	Yusry KRU; Loloq	4:15
3.	"Gemilang"		5:43
4.	"Mungkin"		3:40
5.	"Aku Kau Dia"		5:33
6.	"Risau"		3:20
7.	"Esok Lusa Selamanya"	Ogie; Kyoji Yamamoto; Ella	5:46
8.	"Ala Amerika"		5:16
9.	"Penawar"	Salman; Loloq	5:01
10.	"Nuri"	Ella; Hamid; Loloq	4:32
11.	"Itulah Saya"		4:44
12.	"Rindu"	Korie; Kyoji Yamamoto; Ella	3:18
13.	"Menanti (Instrumental)"	M. Nasir	5:43
14.	"Gemilang (Instrumental)"	Kyoji Yamamoto	5:27

== Personnel ==
Credits are adapted from the liner notes of Ella USA.

- Ella – lead vocals, producer
- Kyoji Yamamoto – arranger, lead guitar, rhythm guitar, guitar, producer
- M. Nasir – arranger, producer
- Eric Moon – arranger, keyboards
- John Pierce – bass
- Neil Stubenhaus – bass
- Michael Thompson – guitar, rhythm guitar, slide guitar, acoustic guitar
- John Robinson – drums
- Randy Kerber – keyboards
- Bob Zimmitti – percussion
- Jonathan Melvoin – drums
- Stephen Marcussen – mastering
- Bill Drescher – recording, mixing
- Phil Kaffel – recording
- Martin Horenburg – recording, mixing
- Danny Alonso – assistant engineer
- John Aguto – assistant engineer
- Mike Baumgartner – assistant engineer
- Rick Norman – assistant engineer
- Rob Roscoe – assistant engineer
- Colleen Donahue-Reynolds – recording coordination
- Mohd Arzmy – executive producer, A&R
- Jojie – executive producer

== Certifications ==
Region	Certification	Certified units/sales
Malaysia	6× Platinum	350,000
^{*} Sales figures based on certification alone.^{^} Shipments figures based on certification alone.

== Release history ==
Region	Release date	Edition(s)	Format(s)	Label(s)
Malaysia	5 February 1994	Standard edition	CD, Cassette	EMI Music Malaysia
Malaysia	1994	Special Edition (Gold Disc)	CD	EMI Music Malaysia
Malaysia	1994	Mini album (Promo)	CD	EMI Music Malaysia
Malaysia	1994	Limited Edition (Boxset)	CD	EMI Music Malaysia
Malaysia	2004	Reissue	CD	EMI Music Malaysia
