= Image of Purity =

Studio album by Cromok
- Released: June 1, 1991
- Recorded: 1989–1991
- Studios: Main Street Studio (Sydney, Australia)
- Genre: Thrash metal
- Length: 32:15 (original); 45:31 (re-release)
- Labels: Valentine Sound Productions; EMI Music Malaysia
- Producer: Cromok

Cromok chronology
Image of Purity (demo) (1990)	Image of Purity (1991)	Forever in Time (1993)

Image of Purity is the debut studio album by Malaysian rock band, Cromok, released on 1 June 1991 by Valentine Sound Productions. Originally released as a demo in 1990, the album was a commercial hit upon release, selling 30,000 copies and being certified platinum. A live version of the album was released in 1992, followed by a digitally remastered version in 2000, and a vinyl version in 2024.

== Production ==
Image of Purity was the first studio album released by the band. It was originally produced as a demo during their studies in Australia and was released in March 1990 and distributed among tape traders in the Australian metal scene. Following the success of the demo version of Image of Purity, the band decided to envisioned it as a studio album. Although it is a studio album, it is more like an extended play (EP) as there are six songs included in the album. The recording process was done at the Main Street Studio in Australia with the band self-financed the album, engineered and mixed by Rob Specogna and mastered by Glen Ferguson at the Rich North Studio.

== Artwork ==
The cover art photography was conceptualized by Wan and the band, with illustration done by Mustahir "Wak" Turan and photography by Danny Kaleda. The album cover depicts a unicorn drinking from a stream in a mystical forest setting. The band would later emphasised the use of unicorn image for their subsequent releases, except for their 2003 compilation album, Engraved in Eternity.

== Release and reception ==
Image of Purity was released on 1 June 1991 to popular success, and selling 30,000 copies without any promotion. It was later re-released in 2000 in a digitally remastered release by EMI Music Malaysia and containing five new tracks. It also receive critical praise upon release and being certified platinum.

To promote the album, Cromok performs songs in the album in a 3-day concert held at the Life Centre Jalan Sultan Ismail, Kuala Lumpur from 10 to 12 July 1992.

The album is also the only Cromok album to feature original member Din as guitarist/vocalist before he left to form D'Cromok. "Misty", one of the album's main single, was voted the most-played English languaged song in Malaysia for 2006 by the Music Authors Copyright Protection (MACP). It also received its first official vinyl releases and was released on 21 June 2024.

== Track listing ==
All tracks are written by Cromok.

Standard version
No.	Title	Length
1.	"Metallurgical"	4:41
2.	"Unicorn"	5:29
3.	"La Crosse"	4:55
4.	"Misty"	5:54
5.	"Prophecy"	3:16
6.	"Journey"	5:51
Total length:		32:15

Image of Purity & Live
No.	Title	Length
1.	"Metallurgical" (Live at Life Centre, KL)	7:07
2.	"Misty" (Live at Life Centre, KL)	7:28

2000 remastered version
No.	Title	Length
1.	"The Ulek"	2:43
2.	"Metallurgical"	4:35
3.	"Survival"	4:00
4.	"Misty"	5:48
5.	"Journey"	5:47
6.	"Unicorn"	5:23
7.	"Surivival" (instrumental)	4:00
8.	"La Crosse"	4:49
9.	"Prophecy"	3:10
10.	"Back To Back"	5:07
11.	"Whisper"	0:09
Total length:		45:31

== Credits and personnel ==
The credits are adapted from the album's booklet liner notes.

- Cromok - vocals, composer, producer, mixer, musical arrangement, artwork concept
- Rob Specogna - engineer, mixer
- Glen Ferguson - mastering
- C.L. Toh - remastering
- Wan - artwork concept
- Danny Kaleda - photography
- Mustahir "Wak" Turan - illustration
- Main Street Studio - recording studio
- Rich North Studio - mastering studio

== Certifications ==
Region	Certification	Certified units/sales
Malaysia	Platinum	30,000

== Release history ==
Release history
Region	Date	Format(s)	Label	Ref.
Malaysia	June 1, 1991	CD; cassette; music download; streaming	Valentine Sound Productions	
