= Genki Hitomi =

Japanese former singer and teacher (born 1957)

- Born: October 1, 1957 (age 68)
- Origin: Tokyo, Japan
- Genres: Rock, heavy metal
- Occupations: Vocalist, teacher
- Years active: 1983–1990, 2009, 2010, 2024, 2025

Genki Hitomi (人見 元基, Hitomi Genki) (born Noriaki Hitomi, October 1, 1957 in Tokyo, Japan) is a Japanese former singer and teacher is best known as the lead vocalist of the Japanese heavy metal band Vow Wow in the 1980s.

== Biography ==
Hitomi started his career as a singer when he was a student of TUFS. Then he formed Noiz with the members of Carmen Maki & OZ. Noiz released their first album in 1983, but they soon broke up.

In 1984, Hitomi joined Bow Wow, and the band was renamed to Vow Wow. Vow Wow released six studio albums and broke up in 1990. After that, Hitomi became an English teacher at a preparatory school in Tokyo, then became an English teacher at a high school in Tokyo.
