= A. Rahman Hassan =

Malaysian singer (1946–2019)

Dato' A. Rahman Hassan
- Born: Abdul Rahman bin Hassan; 30 July 1946; Kuala Lumpur, Malayan Union (now Malaysia)
- Died: 13 June 2019 (aged 72); Ampang, Selangor, Malaysia
- Resting place: Muslim Cemetery of Taman Keramat, Kuala Lumpur
- Occupation: Singer
- Spouses: Azizah binti Mohamad (m. 1970; died 2013) Fadilah Mansor (m. 2014)
- Children: Khir Rahman
- Musical career
- Genre: Pop
- Instruments: Vocal; Guitar
- Years active: 1970–2010
- Labels: EMI Music Malaysia; Universal Music Malaysia

Dato' Abdul Rahman bin Hassan (30 July 1946 – 13 June 2019) was a Malaysian singer. He won the Music Industry Leadership Award in the Papuita Kecapi Award 2006.

From 1970 to 2013, he was married to singer Azizah binti Mohamad. After she died in 2013, he married actress Fadilah Mansor on 25 December 2014.

== Death ==
Rahman was hospitalized on 1 June 2019 from complications of a stroke, and died shortly after midnight on 13 June. He was buried at Taman Keramat Cemetery (in Taman Keramat / Setiawangsa, near Kuala Lumpur).

== Discography ==
=== Songs ===
1. Bimbang
2. Cincin Belah Rotan
3. Hanya Untukku
4. Perpaduan Hidup
5. Semoga Berjaya
6. Usah di kesalkan - lirik & lagu: Dato’ A Rahman Hassan
7. Nasib pak tani - lirik & lagu: Dato’ A Rahman Hassan
8. Syurga idaman - lagu: Dato’ A Rahman Hassan & lirik: Ali Omar
9. Tak mengapa - lirik & lagu: Dato’ A Rahman Hassan
10. Mestikah - lirik & lagu: Dato’ A Rahman Hassan
11. Kerana Fitnah - lagu: MYRosnah & lirik: Dato’ A Rahman Hassan
12. Pergilah kanda ku - lagu: Dato’ A Rahman Hassan & lirik: Ali Omar
13. Nikmat yang tak ternilai - lirik & lagu: Dato’ A Rahman Hassan

== Awards and nominations ==
- Music Industry Leadership Award (Papuita Kecapi Award 2006).
