= Art Fazil =

Singaporean singer and musician

Art Fazil is a Singaporean singer and musician. He spent his childhood in Singapore and Malaysia. He grew up listening to his uncle's record collection which included legends such as Jimi Hendrix, Bob Marley, The Beatles, The Rolling Stones and Deep Purple. Later on he turned on to U2, Nusrat Fateh Ali Khan and Ali Farka Touré.

He started writing songs at age 13. By 18, Art was writing songs for regional big names like Ramli Sarip and Ella. In the early 1990s Art began working as a roadie for Ramli while he continued writing songs for major Malaysian acts such as Lefthanded, Ella and Kathy Ibrahim, with many songs published by Warner Music.

== Rausyanfikir ==
After his stint as a roadie, he formed a folk rock band called Rausyanfikir, Persian for "thinkers", with school friends Esham Jamil and Mohd Khair Mohd Yasin. The band recorded two significant albums—Rausyanfikir (1992) and Rusuhan Fikiran (1994). Influenced by Iwan Fals, Usman Awang and Kembara, the band wrote songs exploring issues such as social consciousness, political reawakening and cultural preservation in the face of rapid modernisation.

Its single from their second release " Dhikir Fikir Fikir" was awarded Best Local Malay Composition 1997 by COMPASS (Composers and Authors Society of Singapore) Awards.

Both albums enjoyed modest sales, about 50,000 copies. The band's musical alchemy was affected with the death of member Esham Jamil after a prolonged illness which began after the release of their second album.

== England ==
In between the band's albums, Art wrote and recorded a solo English album. The single, "Sometimes When I Feel Blue", went to number 1 on the local charts for several weeks, and was awarded the Best Local English Pop Song in the COMPASS Awards.

In 1995, Art moved to London to reinvent himself. He started gigging at 'Open mike' sessions and continued playing on the live music circuit. He played at almost every venue in London including The Rock Garden, Bungies, The 12 Bar Club, Ain't Nothin' But the Blues etc. He also played at venues around the UK—from Kent and Manchester Universities to the Edinburgh Fringe Festival.

His musical style evolved as his circle of friends and musicians widened. London was 'a grove of the mind'. The city's colourful multiculturalism gave him space and energy to explore.

Some of his best live cuts were captured in his 1998 release "Acoustic Juju" which also included the Edinburgh's Tympnali Song Competition winner, "Monsoon Rain".

In January 2000, Fazil returned to Singapore to perform for the Taman Warisan Fundraiser (Malay Heritage Board), performing with the Singapore Symphony Orchestra at the Victoria Theatre and Concert Hall. The prestigious event was attended by the President of the Republic of Singapore, Mr. Sellapan Ramanathan and the First Lady, Foreign Dignitaries and local members of parliament.

In late October 2000, Art released an introspective album called Nur (Light) inspired by his overseas experiences. The album received 7 nominations in Mediacorp's Anugerah Planet Music 2001 which brought together acts from Singapore, Malaysia and Indonesia. He won 4 out of the 7 awards he was nominated for. The song 'Merindu Kepastian (Longing)' went to the Number 1 spot in the Singapore charts.

In early 2001, Art began a Postgraduate education at The Guildhall School of Music and Drama. Art completed his post-graduate course there in 2003.

Later that year, he formed Jawi Empire, a World music band with strong influences from African and gamelan music at the Royal Festival Hall, London, as part of the multicultural celebration, Festival of Lights.

In September 2002, Art played at the South Bank Centre in London, as part of the singer-songwriter festival called 'The Song's The Thing' organised by Kashmir Klub and The Performing rights Society (UK).

In October 2002, Art recorded an English number for the Mercy Relief charity album. The song, entitled 'Song for the World' was co-written with Canadian songwriter Lee Lindsey and two British songwriters, Mark Bryan and C. Christine. It was produced byJack Guy at Sphere Studios in London.

An avid wanderer, Art travelled in Europe, Turkey and the Middle East. In 2005, inspired by Amsterdam's Pasar Malam Besar, he founded the first London Malay Festival. As part of Malay Arts & Tradition London which had participation from Singapore, Malaysia, Indonesia, Madagascar, Thailand and Sri Lanka. The event held at the Royal Horticultural Centre in Victoria enjoyed a tremendous success. It was attended by Londoners and dignitaries which included Madagascar's Ambassador to the United Kingdom and designer Jimmy Choo.

Art continued developing his song writing by constantly performing at live music venues in London such the world-famous Kashmir Klub founded by ex-Cutting Crew Tony Moore, Tall Poppy Presents, Pronto (Frith Street, Soho), Mawar (Edgware Road), The Visible (Portobello Road), The Bedford, Balham and The New Inn (St John's Wood)

In February 2007, Art performed at London's West End Arts Theatre in the Phil Ryan Show which featured UK acts such asBaby Sol, Peter Conway and Evi Vine.

In March 2008 he completed a course in Business Music at the Institute of Contemporary Music Performance. In April 2008, he performed alongside Malaysia's superstar M. Nasir at the Ambassador Theatre in Dublin, Ireland. He also began to work as an actor. He performed in two telemovies, Kau Mencipta Dosa Ku and Salam Lebaran, in Malaysia under director Erma Fatima for Malaysia's Astro cable TV network.

Art was also an activist with The Free Tibet Campaign UK

He released a solo album called Syair Melayu (Malay Poems) on 20 June 2009 in Singapore, Malaysia, Indonesia, Japan and the United Kingdom.

Art Fazil is signed to Moro Records Malaysia. The first single from the label is Rilek Brader -Art Fazil featuring Imuda released in January 2013.

In celebration of the 20th anniversary of his debut English album (1993–2013), Moro Records has released a Special Collector's Edition CD with all 12 tracks digitally remastered.

In April 2015, Art Fazil curated a one-month-long exhibition at The National Museum of Singapore as part of the SG50 Celebrations. The exhibition was entitled ‘Ole Ole Temasek: 50 Years of Singapore Malay Pop Music’. It showcased 50 years history of Singapore Malay Pop Music beginning with 1965 right to 2015. As part of the exhibition, Art gave a talk on the rise of the Nusantara music movement in the 1990s.

In September 2015, Art Fazil produced 'Konsert Pop Malar Segar' for NAC's Silver Arts Festival in celebration of the pioneer generation of Singapore. The show was held at The Kallang Theatre featuring legendary artistes such as Sanisah Huri, Dato’ A. Rahman Hassan, J. Mizan and Maria Bachok. The show also featured younger talents namely Aisyah Aziz and Imran Ajmain.

== Awards ==
1995– COMPASS Best English Song for Sometimes When I Feel Blue

1995– Anugerah Persuratan (Malay Literature Award) for lyrics of the song 'Ali Malas' from Rausyanfikir II.

1997– COMPASS Best Local Malay Song for Dikir Fikir Fikir from Rausyanfikir II.

1997– Winner of Tympanli Songwriter's Competition, Edinburgh Fringe Festival, Scotland, United Kingdom

2001– Mediacorp's Anugerah Planet Music Awards:

1) Best Singapore Album 2001

2) Best New (Singapore) Solo Artiste 2001

3) Best New (Regional) Artiste 2001

2001– Getaran Global Ria (World Music Programme) The New York Festivals Finalist Award, International Competition For Radio Advertising And Programming

2015 - The Golden Point Award 2015 - 2nd Prize for Malay Poetry; Honourable Mention Short Story (Malay)
