= Ella (Malaysian singer) =

Malaysian singer (born 1966)

Hajah Ella SMP PJK
- نور زيلا بنت أمين الدين
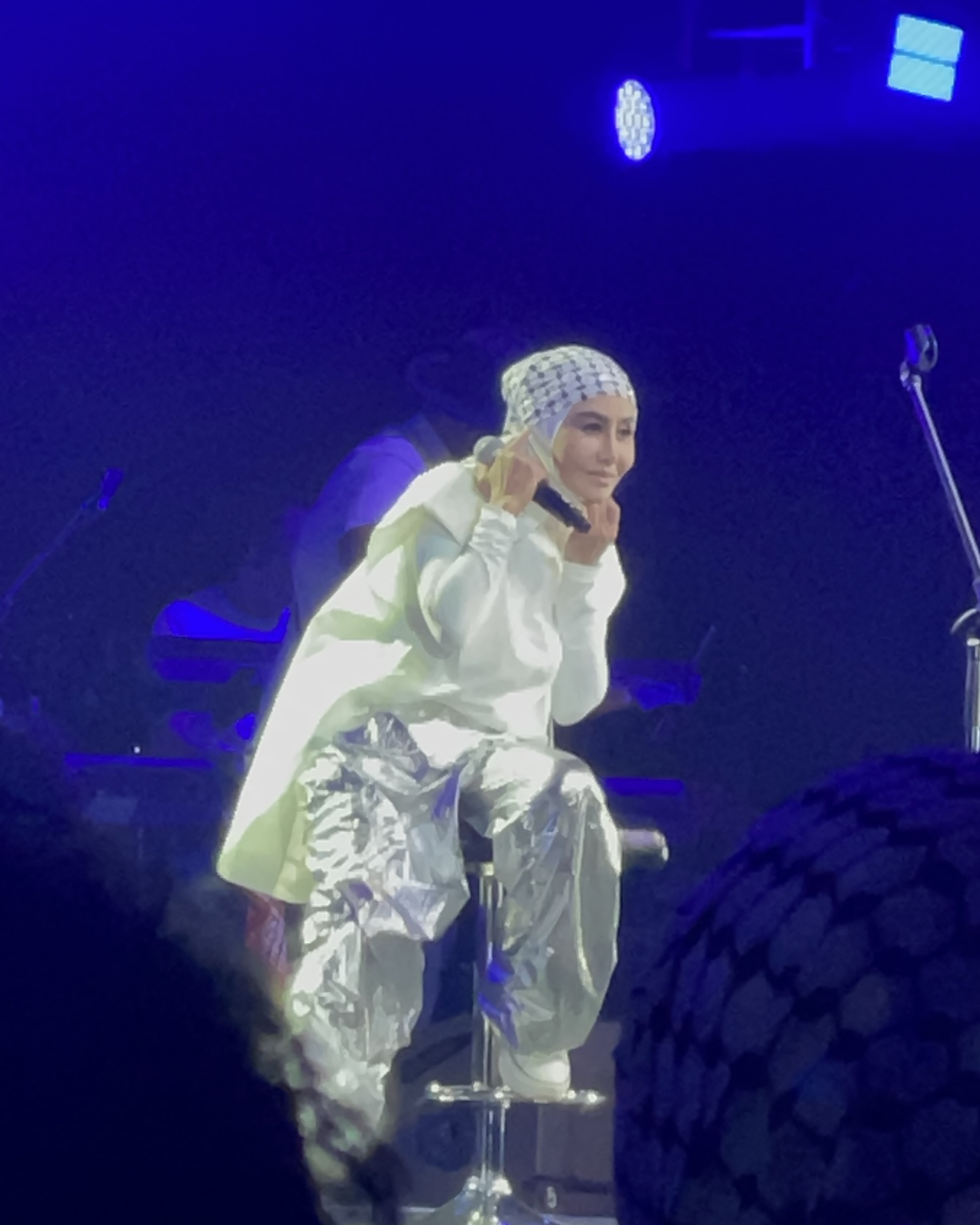
- Ella performing in Sabah on 20 January 2024
- Born: Nor Zila binti Aminuddin; 31 July 1966 (age 60); Gelugor, Penang, Malaysia
- Occupations: Musician; singer; actress; model; entrepreneur
- Years active: 1983–present
- Spouse: Azhar Husaini Ghazali (m. 2012)
- Musical career
- Genres: Rock; hard rock; pop rock; pop metal; rock kapak
- Instruments: Vocals
- Labels: WEA (now known as Warner Music Malaysia); EMI Music Malaysia; Musica Studios (distributor in Indonesia)

Signature
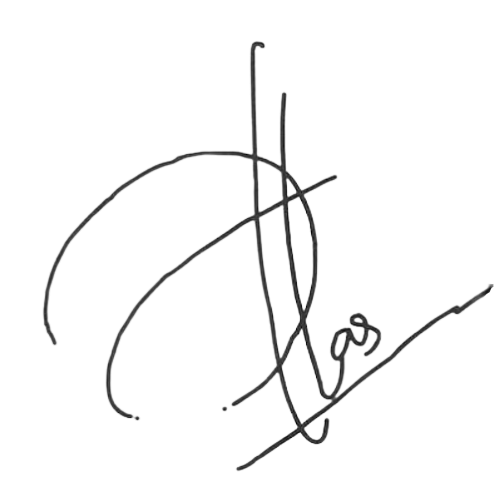

Nor Zila binti Aminuddin (Jawi: نور زيلا بنت أمين الدين; IPA: Malay pronunciation: [ˈnʊrˈzila ˈbinti ˈaminudɪn]; born 31 July 1966), known professionally as Ella, is a Malaysian musician, singer, actress, model, and entrepreneur. She began her career in 1983 at the age of 19 with a local band called Moonracker. She left the band after two years and continued her career by singing at local nightclubs. During that time, a local band called The Boys approached Ella, and they later became Ella & The Boys.

== Life and career ==
She attended Tengku Ampuan Rahimah High School in the Klang Valley. She started her career as a singer at local nightclubs and lounges. While singing in one of those clubs, Ella was approached by a band called The Boys, which she later merged with to create Ella & The Boys. On June 10, 2012, Ella and her protégé, Puteri Caroline Kamel, won TV3's Mentor Season 6 talent search.

== Personal life ==
On July 7, 2012, Ella married Azhar Ghazali, a pilot 15 years her junior.

== Discography ==
=== Studio albums ===
Year	Title	Producer	Label
1989	Pengemis Cinta	Ramli Sarip	WEA (now Warner Music Malaysia)
1990	Puteri Kota	Ramli Sarip	WEA (now Warner Music Malaysia)
1990	Identiti	Ramli Sarip	WEA (now Warner Music Malaysia)
1991	Mendung Tak Bererti Hujan (for Indonesian market)		WEA (now Warner Music Malaysia)
1992	30110	Man Keedal & M. Nasir	EMI Music Malaysia
1994	Ella USA	Kyoji Yamamoto	EMI Music Malaysia
1995	8494		EMI Music Malaysia
1998	El		EMI Music Malaysia
2000	Diva Metal		EMI Music Malaysia
2001	Ilham Bicara		EMI Music Malaysia
2003	Simbiosis		EMI Music Malaysia
2007	Rama-Rama		
2017	Peace.Love.Rindu		

=== Compilation albums ===
Year	Title	Producer	Label
1992	Unggul		EMI Music Malaysia
1993	Ella – Remix		EMI Music Malaysia
2005	Ratu Rock		EMI Music Malaysia
2008	Balada		
2009	Greatest Hits		

=== Video album(s) ===
Year	Title	Producer	Label
1991	Ella Mood		

== Filmography ==
=== Film ===
Year	Title	Role	Notes
1991	Bayangan Maut	Herself	Debut film appearances
1993	Pemburu Bayang	Herself	
1997	Hanya Kawan	Herself	
2002	Les Sekinchan	Herself	Television film on VCD channel
2013	KIL	Neighbour	Guest appearance

=== Television ===
Year	Title	Role	TV channel
2020–2024	The Masked Singer Malaysia	Jury	Astro Warna
