= Cromok =

Malaysian heavy metal rock band

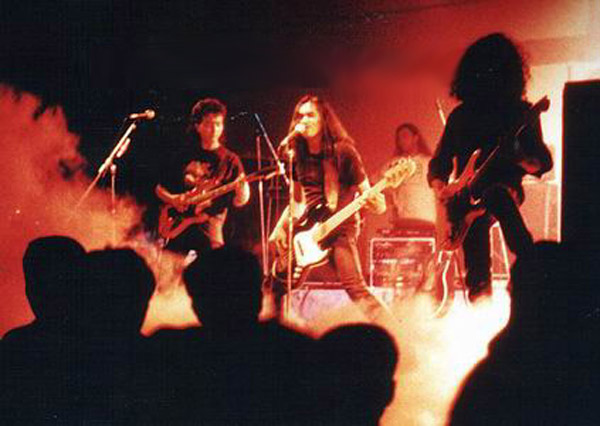
- Cromok performing live in the late 1980s

Background information
- Origin: Shah Alam, Selangor, Malaysia
- Genre: Thrash metal
- Years active: 1987–2006; 2010–present
- Label: EMI Music Malaysia
- Members: Shamsuddin Ali (Sam); Khairul Anuar Shariff (Karl)
- Past members: Hillary Ang (Hill); Kharuddin Muhammad (Din; deceased); Che Dean (Denan); Muhammad Fadhil (Mat Puck); Nik Ramzee (Ji); Tarmizi Mokhtar (Miji; deceased)
- Website: www.cromok.my

Cromok is a Malaysian rock band known as pioneers of Malaysian thrash metal. Formed in 1987, the original and current members are Shamsudin "Sam" Ali (vocals and bass) and Khairul Anuar "Karl" Shariff (guitarist). The band is best known for their songs "Misty", "Another You", "I Don't Belong Here," and has released eight studio albums to date. Fans of Cromok are known as 'Cromers'.

== History ==
Cromok was formed in April 1987 by four young students: Kharuddin Muhammad (Din), Shamsuddin Ali (Sam), Khairul Anuar Shariff (Karl), and Tarmizi Mokhtar (Miji). Din, the senior member, played a key role in developing the musical and visual style that would define Cromok. They were studying at the University of Wollongong in New South Wales, Australia. While in Australia, they decided to form a thrash metal band to pass the time. They frequently performed their music at small concerts and gigs, primarily within the Sydney Metal Scene. They received positive responses and steadily gained fans, making a name for themselves in the Australian Underground Thrash Metal scene. They rose through the ranks alongside prominent Australian Godfather bands such as Enticer, SSDC, Mortal Sin, Frozen Doberman, White Trash, Addictive, and Detriment. Their single, "Misty," became their most popular song among fans at the time.

In 1992, Sam, Karl, and Miji returned to Malaysia, while Din had already returned the previous year due to an unavoidable personal issue, causing them to lose their spot as Motörhead's opening act. After Din's return to Malaysia, they employed the services of session musicians, including rhythm guitarist Erwin and lead guitarist Oggy. Upon returning from Sydney, Cromok performed four concerts at Life Centre in Jalan Sultan Ismail from July 10, 1992, to July 12, 1992. These shows marked their first major performances since moving back to Malaysia. Unfortunately, to the disappointment of many early Cromok fans, Din was never invited to perform or record in the studio, despite his significant role in the band's formation and instrumental contribution to the development of the Cromok Nusantara Thrash Metal sound. Their first album/demo, Image of Purity, recorded during their studies, was released in 1990 and distributed among tape traders in the Australian metal scene. It was later picked up by Valentine Sound Productions Sdn Bhd for distribution in Malaysia. The album received positive responses, particularly from teenagers, and helped them build a large local fan base in a short period. Songs such as "Another You," "I Don't Belong Here," "Misty," "Metallurgical" and "Memories" were highly praised by their fans. However, their success was short-lived due to the negative perception of metal music by the Malaysian government at the time, as Rock, Heavy Metal, and Thrash Metal were considered unacceptable and were often discriminated against and banned during the late 1980s and early 1990s in Malaysia. Despite this, they continued to grow musically, releasing seven more albums: Forever in Time (1993), Yours Truly (1996), Mean, Meaner, Meanest (1999), What's Left (2000), Deafening Silence (2002), Untitled (2004) and a few special edition compilations. Forever in Time remains their most successful album, selling over 100,000 copies in Malaysia. A digitally remastered version of their debut album was issued in 2000.

Khairuddin Muhammad, Din, the founding singer-songwriter of Cromok and D'Cromok, died on September 27, 1997, from malaria in Mersing, Johor. His remains were buried in Kampung Getting, Tumpat, Kelantan. He was found dead by his wife and daughter. Due to some friction between Din and the other members (as noted in the inlay notes of the D'Cromok 7 Years and 7 Days Part 1 and Part 2 albums), the band continued as a trio. However, in 2001, Karl left Cromok to focus on his professional career and family. He was replaced by renowned Malaysian guitar maestro Hillary Ang from the iconic Malaysian rock band Search.

In April 2005, Cromok performed live at Planet Hollywood Kuala Lumpur. At the end of 2005, Hillary returned to Search, leaving Sam and Miji as the remaining members of Cromok. Sam then announced that the band would go on hiatus and all activities would be suspended. After almost five years of hiatus from the music scene, on April 8, 2012, they held a reunion concert in Kuala Lumpur, Malaysia at KLive, featuring three original members (Sam, Karl, and Miji, with Shah Ziri from Nrocinu as rhythm guitar sessionist), which also celebrated the band's 25th anniversary. This was one of the last concerts of Cromok, following their final performance at Hard Rock Cafe, Bangkok. On August 21, 2013, Cromok performed as the opening act for Metallica's live concert in Malaysia.

On February 3, 2018, Cromok performed alongside XPDC at the Konsert Cromok & XPDC Live in MAEPS, Serdang. That same year, they announced that they would introduce a new concept of Malaysian thrash metal music, known as Thrashditional, a portmanteau of "thrash metal" and "traditional".

On October 14, 2023, Cromok's "Forever in Time 30th Anniversary Concert" took place at Zepp Kuala Lumpur. The Ministry of Tourism, Arts and Culture (MOTAC) supported this performance, which featured thrash metal music in several tracks along with traditional instruments like gamelan, angklung, and flute. Shortly before the show ended, Kamelia Kharuddin, the daughter of past band member Din, delivered an appreciation speech to all the Cromok fans—the Cromers—for continuously supporting and remembering her late father. Tarmizi Mokhtar (Miji) announced his retirement from the band as a drummer, due to undisclosed health matters. It was later discovered that he was battling Stage 4 cancer. The band's song, "Farewell", followed. This concert lasted almost two and a half hours, with the song "Memories" played as an opening.

On March 6, 2024, Tarmizi Mokhtar (Miji), drummer and co-founder of Cromok, died from liver cancer at the age of 58.

== Style ==
The band sings in English. They are also known to have at least one instrumental track on every album. Sam uses a teutonic thrash raspy vocal style, sometimes with low guttural tones, while the band's music sounds similar to Bay Area thrash metal with a touch of Malay/Nusantara influences. Cromok also often experiments with Malay cultural music elements and sounds, adding Malay elements to their artwork. They are also known for incorporating unicorns on their album covers.

== Members ==
Founding members

- Kharuddin Muhammad (Din) - backing vocal, guitarist (1987–1992; died 1997)
- Muhammad Fadhil (Mat Puck) - guitar (1987)
- Che Dean (Denan) - guitar (1987)
- Prof. Dr. Nik Ramzi Nik Idris (Ji) - bass (1987)

Current members

- Shamsudin Ali (Sam) - lead vocals, bass guitar (1987–present)
- Khairul Anuar Shariff (Karl) - lead/rhythm guitar (1987–2000; 2010–present)
- Shah Sidious (formerly of tribute band Nrocinu)

Former members

- Hillary Ang - lead guitar (2000–2005)
- Tarmizi Mokhtar (Miji) - drums (1987–2023; died 2024)

== Discography ==
=== Studio albums ===
Title	Album details
Image of Purity	Released: 1990 (demo), 1991 (studio album); Reissued: 2000; Label: Valentine Sound Productions; Format: CD, cassette, digital download
Forever in Time	Released: 1993; Label: EMI Music Malaysia; Format: CD, cassette, digital download
Yours Truly	Released: 1996; Label: EMI Music Malaysia; Format: CD, cassette, digital download
Mean, Meaner, Meanest	Released: 1999; Label: EMI Music Malaysia; Format: CD, cassette, digital download
What's Left	Released: 2000; Label: EMI Music Malaysia; Format: CD, cassette, digital download
Deafening Silence	Released: 2002; Label: EMI Music Malaysia; Format: CD, cassette, digital download
Untitled	Released: 2004; Label: EMI Music Malaysia; Format: CD, cassette, digital download

=== Live albums ===
Title	Album details
Image of Purity & Live	Released: 1992; Label: EMI Music Malaysia; Format: CD, cassette
Untitled+Raw	Released: 2005; Label: EMI Music Malaysia; Format: CD, cassette, digital download

=== Compilation albums ===
Title	Album details
Engraved in Eternity	Released: 2003; Label: EMI Music Malaysia; Format: CD, cassette, digital download
Anthology	Released: 2009; Label: EMI Music Malaysia; Format: CD, boxset

=== Other albums ===
Title	Album details
Mentera Metal	Released: 1998; Label: Universal Music Malaysia; Format: CD, cassette
Cromok & FTG	Released: 2000; Label: EMI Music Malaysia, Pony Canyon; Format: CD, cassette
XPDC & Cromok	Released: 2018; Label: Universal Music Malaysia; Format: CD, digital download

== Concerts ==
Headlining

- Cromok Reunion Thrashing Kuala Lumpur (8 April 2012)
- Konsert Metal Legends Cromok & XPDC (3 February 2018)
- Cromok Forever in Time 30th Anniversary Concert, Zepp Kuala Lumpur (14 October 2023)
- Cromok & ACAB Clash of the Titans, Zepp Kuala Lumpur (9 March 2024)
- The Real Cromok, Zepp Kuala Lumpur (7 December 2024, featuring Man Kidal & Hillary Ang)
- Konsert Kasi Gegar Cromok vs Amuk, N9 Arena, Nilai, Negeri Sembilan (26 April 2025)

Opening act

- Metallica LIVE in Malaysia (21 August 2013)
