= Bow Wow (band) =

Japanese heavy metal band

- Also known as: Vow Wow; Bow Wow G2
- Origin: Tokyo, Japan
- Genres: Heavy metal; hard rock
- Years active: Bow Wow: 1975–1984, 1995–1997, 1998–present Vow Wow: 1984–1990 (reunions: 2009, 2010, 2024, 2025)
- Labels: Victor, VAP, Toshiba EMI, Arista (US), Rockcandy (US), Heavy Metal (EU), Roadrunner (EU)
- Members: Kyoji Yamamoto; Mitsuhiro Saito
- Past members: Kenji Sano; Genki Hitomi; Rei Atsumi; Neil Murray; Mark Gould; Tetsuya Horie; Hiroshi Yaegashi; Shotaro Mitsuzono; Eiji Mitsuzono; Toshihiro Niimi
- Website: bowwow-army.jp

Bow Wow are a Japanese rock band formed in 1975. Originally consisting of guitarist and vocalists Kyoji Yamamoto and Mitsuhiro Saito, bassist Kenji Sano and drummer Toshihiro Niimi, they were one of the first Japanese metal bands. After releasing nine studio albums, Saito left in 1983. The band then adopted a mainstream sound by recruiting lead vocalist Genki Hitomi and keyboardist Rei Atsumi and renamed themselves to Vow Wow in 1984. They released three studio albums, before relocating to England in 1986. Sano left the band the following year and Yamamoto and Niimii asked original Whitesnake bassist Neil Murray, to replace him. After two studio albums, Murray left to join Black Sabbath and American session bassist Mark Gould played on Vow Wow's last album, before they disbanded in 1990.

Yamamoto reformed Bow Wow in 1995 with all new members, before it became a trio when original members Saito and Niimi rejoined the band, in 1998. Niimi left in 2015 and the group now performs under the name Bow Wow G2, which refers to the two guitarists being the only official members.

Tomoaki Hokari of OK Music wrote that Bow Wow was one of the first Japanese bands to prove that domestic musicians could compete with Western hard rock acts. In Japan their best-selling album is V which reached number 12 on the Oricon chart. Internationally their best-selling album is Helter Skelter, which reached number 75 on the UK Albums Chart.

== History ==
=== 1975–1984: Bow Wow ===
Bow Wow was formed in 1975, by Yoshimi Ueno who was a record producer and was looking to create an idol-like band, similar to The Monkees or the Bay City Rollers. After recruiting vocalist and guitarist Mitsuhiro Saito and drummer Toshihiro Niimi, from the band Do T. Doll, whom he had managed before, vocalist and guitarist Kyoji Yamamoto and bassist Kenji Sano, who were scouted from Yamaha Music School joined and Bow Wow was officially formed. Hokari wrote that, once 19-year-old guitar virtuoso Yamamoto joined and was elected to sing in English, the idol concept was largely dropped in favor of authenticity. Niimi himself stated that if Yamamoto had not joined, they would have never become a hard rock band.

They were quickly signed to Victor and used the money to buy a truck, that could double as a stage, which earned them interviews with many magazines and television shows. Bow Wow released their self-titled debut studio album in 1976. Yamamoto recalled that when he joined, he told the producer he was a guitarist and not a singer, but during recording someone suggested he sing in English and he went with it. In 1977, they opened for Aerosmith and Kiss on their Japanese tours and released two more studio albums, Signal Fire and Charge.

According to AllMusic's Eduardo Rivadavia, their next few albums were criticized by critics and fans, as being musically all over the place, veering from their hard rock roots, and suffering from poor production values. Yamamoto himself has described the three consecutive studio albums, Guarantee released in 1978 and Glorious Road and Telephone, both released in 1980, as being the band's "pop era." He noted that Saito was the main vocalist on Guarantee and Glorious Road, but he took over vocal duties again on Telephone, where he looked to fuse pop with rock. For Telephone, the band switched record labels to Sounds Marketing System and worked with producer Touru Yazawa, who had produced for the folk rock group Alice.

Bow Wow released the studio album Hard Dog in 1981, which returned the band to a respectable hard rock act. In 1982, they switched labels again to VAP and released two more studio albums, Asian Volcano and Warning from Stardust. The band also performed at that year's Montreux Jazz Festival in Switzerland and the Reading Festival in England. The following year they toured with Hanoi Rocks across the UK and played their final concert at Nakano Sun Plaza, on 21 November 1983. It was Saito's last concert with the band, as he left to join ARB.

=== 1984–1990: Vow Wow ===
In early 1984, the remaining three founding members were joined by vocalist Genki Hitomi and keyboardist Rei Atsumi, this resulted in a more commercial sound and the band decided a name change was necessary. Now called Vow Wow, the group released their debut album Beat of Metal Motion in 1984, before signing to Toshiba EMI for their second album Cyclone, released in 1985 and relocated to England in 1986. After releasing their third album III, during that same year, they found themselves without a bassist when Kenji Sano returned to Japan, for personal reasons in May 1987. He would later retire from music completely. Another Japanese bassist flew out to England for an audition, but it did not work out. Niimi then suggested that Yamamoto call Neil Murray, who had recently left Whitesnake and whom they both knew, from having worked on the second album by Phenomena. After a jam session, Murray agreed to join the band for their next album and later agreed to a tour of Japan. Although, Murray would later state that he never became a full band member. Vow Wow then began recording their fourth album V in 1987, in Ibiza with producer Kit Woolven (Thin Lizzy, David Bowie) and co-producer John Wetton, who wrote the lyrics for the album's hit single "Don't Leave Me Now". They were asked by Tommy Vance to create the jingles for his British radio program, the Friday Rock Show. After releasing their fifth album Vibe in 1988, which included the hard rock anthem "Rock Me Now" which was released as a single, the band returned to Japan for a national tour. Although experiencing commercial success, Hitomi wanted to remain in Japan, to start a family. Vow Wow recorded what was supposed to be their final album, Helter Skelter in 1989, which was produced by Tony Taverner (Gipsy Kings) and was, as Rivadavia put it, a "re-sequenced, repackaged, and reissue" of Vibe. After the album, Atsumi joined RC Succession for a tour, while Murray joined Black Sabbath. According to Yamamoto, Murray told him he had to leave Vow Wow because drummer Cozy Powell, was insistent that he join Black Sabbath and the bassist could not say no to his close friend.

Shortly after, producers Nick Griffiths (Queen, Paul McCartney) and Bob Ezrin (Kiss, Pink Floyd) requested to make an album with Vow Wow. The band reformed in Los Angeles, and utilized American session bassist Mark Gould for their sixth and final album, Mountain Top released in 1990. Vow Wow disbanded after their 28 May 1990 concert, at the Nippon Budokan. Yamamoto later said that the band had thought they could get signed to an American record label, but when that did not happen, "We lost our aim and then we started to get frustrated and our relationships collapsed. It was sad but 1990 was a bad year for hard rock bands. The hard rock and heavy metal scene was in decline." Hitomi became a high school English teacher, while the other members each continued separate musical careers. Yamamoto formed the power trio Wild Flag in 1991. Niimi formed the bands Lance of Thrill and The Slut Banks; both with Ziggy bassist Norio Toshiro, while the latter also included Zi:Kill vocalist Tusk.

=== 1995–present: Bow Wow revival and Vow Wow reunion concerts ===
In May 1995, Yamamoto reformed Bow Wow with his bandmates from Wild Flag, brothers Shotaro and Eiji Mitsuzono on bass and drums, respectively, and recruited vocalist Tetsuya Horie and guitarist Hiroshi Yaegashi. After an EP, Bow Wow #0, and an album, Bow Wow #1, Eiji was replaced by the return of Niimi in 1996. They then released the studio album Bow Wow #2 Led by the Sun before briefly pausing activities in 1997. That year, Yamamoto participated in a project by Penicillin drummer O-Jiro, which original Bow Wow member Saito was producing. The resulting jam sessions led to Saito reuniting with Yamamoto and Niimi to make Bow Wow a trio in 1998, and they released the EP Still on Fire and the album Back. The band released an album a year for the next four years; Ancient Dreams in 1999, Beyond in 2000, Another Place in 2001 and What's Going On? in 2002. In August 2003, they performed in Daegu, South Korea at the O.K.! Crazy!! World Rock Festival. In 2005, Bow Wow released Era, their most recent studio album to date.

Vocalist Genki Hitomi and keyboardist Rei Atsumi reunited with Yamamoto and Niimi for a Vow Wow reunion concert on December 25, 2009, and for two sold-out shows the following year, on 25 December and 26 December 2010. Bow Wow released a single called "King or Queen" in 2014. Niimi left Bow Wow in 2015 and the group now performs sporadically under the name Bow Wow G2, which refers to the two guitarists, Yamamoto and Saito, being the only official members. In August 2016, Bow Wow G2 held a concert for the band's 40th anniversary, which was later released on home video. Three years after their last performance in 2018, the duo held a concert for their 45th anniversary on 26 September 2021, at Ebisu Garden Hall, where they recreated the setlist of Bow Wow's 1978 live album Super Live. On June 1, 2023, Yamamoto announced that Niimi had died from cancer on 27 May. Having felt unwell since the beginning of the month, the drummer was admitted to a hospital on 6 May, after being diagnosed with Stage IV cancer that had metastasized throughout his body. Niimi died at 7:38 pm on 27 May, at the age of 66.

Yamamoto, Hitomi and Atsumi reunited as Vow Wow for two concerts at Club Citta on 29 June and 30 June 2024, to celebrate the 40th anniversary of their first album and to pay tribute to Niimi. Hitomi announced that he was returning to professional musical activities during the second night, and Yamamoto later said that all three members would like to reunite as Vow Wow at least once a year. Bow Wow performed at the Time to Rock Festival in Knislinge, Sweden on 7 July 2024. Vow Wow performed two reunion concerts at the Tokyo Dome City Hall on 8 and 9 January 2025.

== Legacy ==
Bow Wow were one of the first Japanese metal bands. Tomoaki Hokari of OK Music wrote that they were one of the acts that proved domestic musicians could compete with Western hard rock acts. Writing for Rolling Stone Japan, Daisuke Kawasaki ranked Warning from Stardust at No. 23 on a 2007 list of the "100 Greatest Japanese Rock Albums of All Time". The title track from Signal Fire was named the 28th best guitar instrumental by Young Guitar Magazine in 2019. Lars Ulrich is a fan of Bow Wow and used to cover their songs with Metallica before they made their debut. X Japan guitarist Hide admired Yamamoto and Saito, and played the Mockingbird-style of guitar because Saito used it. Siam Shade guitarist Daita has also cited Yamamoto as an influence. Rhythm & Drums Magazine wrote that Niimi was influential on later drummers, including by pioneering the use of rubber mats under drum kits. Kouichi of Laputa is a fan of the band and covered their songs while in high school. In 2018, readers and professional musicians voted Atsumi the fifth best keyboardist in the history of hard rock and heavy metal in We Rock magazine's "Metal General Election".

== Members ==
=== Bow Wow ===
==== Current members ====
- Kyoji Yamamoto (山本恭司) – lead vocals (1975–1983, 1998–present), guitar (1975–1983, 1995–1997, 1998–present)
- Mitsuhiro Saito (斉藤光浩) – guitar, backing and lead vocals (1975–1983, 1998–present)
- Shinji Matsumoto (松本慎二) – bass (2016–present, support member)
- Masanori "Cherry" Koyanagi (小柳昌法) – drums (2016–present, support member)

==== Former members ====
- Kenji Sano (佐野賢二) – bass, backing and occasional lead vocals (1975–1983)
- Tetsuya Horie (堀江哲也) – lead vocals (1995–1997)
- Hiroshi Yaegashi (八重樫浩士) – guitar, backing vocals (1995–1997)
- Shotaro Mitsuzono (満園庄太郎) – bass, backing vocals (1995–1997)
- Eiji Mitsuzono (満園英二) – drums (1995–1996)
- Toshihiro Niimi (新美俊宏) – drums (1975–1983, 1996–1997, 1998–2015, died 2023)
- Daisuke Kitsuwa – bass (1998–2015, support member)

=== Vow Wow ===
==== Last line-up ====
- Genki Hitomi (人見元基) – lead vocals (1984–1990, 2009, 2010, 2024, 2025)
- Kyoji Yamamoto – guitar, backing vocals (1984–1990, 2009, 2010, 2024, 2025)
- Rei Atsumi (厚見玲衣) – keyboards, synthesizers, keytar, piano, backing vocals (1984–1990, 2009, 2010, 2024, 2025)
- Toshimi Nagai (永井敏己) – bass (2024, 2025 support member)
- Atsuo Okamoto (岡本郭男) – drums (2024, 2025 support member)

==== Former members ====
- Kenji Sano – bass, backing vocals (1984–1987)
- Neil Murray – bass, backing vocals (1987–1990)
- Mark Gould – bass, backing vocals (1990)
- Toshihiro Niimi – drums (1984–1990, 2009, 2010, died 2023)

== Discography as Bow Wow ==
=== Albums ===
Year	Title	Type
1976	Bow Wow	Studio
1977	Signal Fire	Studio
1977	Charge	Studio
1978	Super Live	Live
1978	Guarantee	Studio
1980	Glorious Road	Studio
1980	Telephone	Studio
1980	Kumikyoku X Bomber (組曲Xボンバー) (for the TV series X-Bomber)	Soundtrack
1981	Hard Dog	Studio
1982	Asian Volcano	Studio
1982	Warning from Stardust	Studio
1983	Holy Expedition	Live
1995	Bow Wow #0	EP
1995	Bow Wow #1	Studio
1996	Bow Wow #2 Led by the Sun	Studio
1998	Still on Fire	EP
1998	Back	Studio
1999	Ancient Dreams	Studio
1999	Live Explosion 1999	Live
2000	Beyond	Studio
2001	Another Place	Studio
2002	What's Going On?	Studio
2005	Super Live 2004	Live
2005	Era	Studio

=== Singles ===
- "Volume On" (1976)
- "Still" (1977)
- "Sabishii Yuugi (1978)
- "Hoshii no wa Omae Dake" (1979)
- "Wasurekaketeta Love Song " (1980)
- "Rainy Train" (1980)
- "Keep on Rockin'" (1980)
- "Soldier in the Space" (1980)
- "Gonna be Alright" (1981)
- "Take Me Away" (1982)
- "Forever" (1983)
- "You're Mine" (1983)
- "One Last Time" (2002)
- "King or Queen" (2014)

=== Compilations ===
- The Bow Wow (1979)
- Locus 1976-1983 (1986)
- The Bow Wow II Decennium (2008)
- XXXV (2011)

=== Videos ===
- The Live Empire (2003)
- Live Explosion 1999 (2003)
- 2003.3.22 Live (2003)
- Rock to the Future 2002 Bow Wow vs XYZ→A (2003)
- Super Live 2004 (2005)
- Super Live 2005 (2006)
- Super Live 2006 (2007)
- Super Live 2007 (2008)
- Super Live 2009 (2010)
- Super Live 2011 (2012)
- Bow Wow G2 Live in Tokyo (2017)

== Discography as Vow Wow ==
=== Albums ===
Year	Title	JP	UK	Type
1984	Beat of Metal Motion			Studio
1985	Cyclone	39		Studio
1986	III	275 (2006 reissue)		Studio
1986	Live			Live
1986	Hard Rock Night/Vow Wow Live			Live
1987	V	35		Studio
1987	Revive			Remix EP
1988	Vibe (Helter Skelter in the United Kingdom)	19	75	Studio
1990	Mountain Top	16		Studio
2019	Majestic Live 1989	171		Live
2020	Live at Reading Festival 1987	252		Live

=== Singles ===
Year	Title	JP	UK	Album
1984	"Beat of Metal Motion"			Beat of Metal Motion
1985	"U.S.A."			Cyclone
1987	"Don't Leave Me Now"	71	83	V
1988	"Cry No More"			V
1988	"Don't Tell Me Lies"			V
1988	"Rock Me Now"			Vibe/Helter Skelter
1989	"Helter Skelter"		77	Vibe/Helter Skelter
1989	"I Feel the Power"		87	Vibe/Helter Skelter
1990	"Tell Me"	23		Mountain Top

=== Compilations ===
Year	Title	JP
1986	Shock Waves	
1988	Vow Wow	
1990	Legacy	60
1992	Best Now	
1996	Twin Best	
2006	Super Best: Rock Me Forever	286
2007	The Vox (8CD+DVD Boxed-set)	

=== Videos ===
Every VHS was re-released on DVD on June 14, 2006

Year	Title	JP
1985	Visions	116
1986	Live	75
1989	Live in the U.K.	80
1990	Japan Live 1990 at Budokan	88
2017	"ヴァウの総て-All About Vow 第一幕～渡英前"	
2021	"アックスの奇蹟 -Veritas! One-night Wonder"	
