= Kyoji Yamamoto =

Japanese musician (born 1956)

- Born: March 23, 1956 (age 70); Matsue, Shimane, Japan
- Genres: Hard rock, heavy metal
- Occupations: Musician, singer-songwriter, record producer
- Instruments: Guitar, vocals
- Years active: 1972–present
- Member of: Bow Wow, Wild Flag, Phenomena
- Website: www.kyoji-yamamoto.com

Kyoji Yamamoto (Japanese: 山本 恭司, Hepburn: Yamamoto Kyōji; born March 23, 1956, in Matsue, Shimane, Japan) is a Japanese musician, singer-songwriter, and record producer who is the leader of the hard rock/heavy metal bands Bow Wow (known as Vow Wow for a period of time) and Wild Flag. He is known for his skillful guitar playing, with former bandmate Neil Murray calling him one of the top Japanese guitarists, and was one of the first hard rock guitarists to use the tapping technique. Yamamoto often uses 24-fret Yamaha HR guitars.

== Career ==
Through his sister, Yamamoto was influenced by classical music and The Beatles; the first rock song he heard was The Beatles' version of "Rock and Roll Music". He experienced culture shock after seeing the Woodstock film; "Up to that point, I hadn't had a chance to listen to real rock music, so when I saw people smoking dope and running around naked, and musicians like Alvin Lee and Keith Moon in 'Woodstock,' it was like a spark going off in my head." The first song he learned on guitar was "Love Like a Man" by Lee's band Ten Years After, but he was also influenced by Jeff Beck, Ritchie Blackmore and Jimi Hendrix. Around the age of 15, Yamamoto received lessons from his classmate Shirō Sano, who taught him guitar chords and songs by Led Zeppelin and Cream. He started a band at school and music gradually took over his life before he moved to Tokyo.

After entering Yamaha Music School, Yamamoto formed Bow Wow in 1975, and they released their debut album a year later. Yamamoto recalled that when he joined, he told the producer he was a guitarist and not a singer, but during recording someone suggested he sing in English and he went with it. The following year, they opened for Aerosmith and Kiss. Yamamoto has called Bow Wow's performance at the 1982 Reading Festival, which was their first show in the United Kingdom, "the most exciting day of my life." In 1984, with the addition of two new members, the group renamed themselves Vow Wow and moved to England in 1986, before disbanding in 1990. Yamamoto reformed Bow Wow with all new members in 1995, however, original guitarist and vocalist Mitsuhiro Saito and drummer Toshihiro Niimi rejoined him in 1998, to become a power trio. Niimi left Bow Wow in 2015, and Yamamoto and Saito now perform sporadically under the name Bow Wow G2, which refers to the two guitarists being the only official members.

Yamamoto began his solo career in 1980 and has appeared as a special guest performer for numerous musicians. In 1986, he was asked by producer Wilfried F. Rimensberger to participate in the supergroup Phenomena, playing on their second album. Since 1998, Yamamoto has created his solo material entirely by himself, playing every instrument and producing, engineering and mastering the recordings.

Yamamoto was to perform his first solo show in the United States on September 24, 2011, with Karl Wilcox from Diamond Head supporting him on drums. However, the show was cancelled. In December 2017, Yamamoto released the album Voice of the Wind, which took 10 years to make from its original conception.

Yamamoto is married and has a son, Maoki, who is a drummer, best known for being the member of jazz fusion band DEZOLVE.

== Discography ==
=== Solo ===
==== Studio albums ====
- Horizon (1980)
- Electric Cinema (1982)
- Mind Arc (1998)
- Requiem (1999)
- Time (2005)
- "Time"〜悠久の時を越えて〜 (2006)
- The Life Album (2010)
- Philosophy (2014)
- Lafcadio (2015)
- Voice of the Wind (2017)
- 2020 (2020)
- Hope is Marching On (2021)
- The Harmony of 57 Strings (2022) – credited to Kyoji Yamamoto & X (Iksa)
- Mindpowers (2023)
- Self Covers Vol. 1 (2024)

==== Compilation albums ====
- Guitar Man (1982)
- Healing Collection 〜The Best of Kyoji Yamamoto〜 (2008, CD & DVD)
- Voyager: The Essential Kyoji Yamamoto (2010, US release)

==== Video albums ====
- "Time"〜悠久の時を越えて〜 (2006)
- 山本恭司ソロ・コンサート 〜July 21, 2007〜」 (2008)
- Free Style Jam (2015)
- Yokohama Summer Rock Fes. Revolution Rocks 2014 (2015)

=== With Wild Flag ===
- Wild Flag (1992)
- Three Faces (1992)
- Wild Land (1993)

== Other work ==
- Silver Stars – Ginsei Dan (1979)
- Heavy Metal Army – Heavy Metal Army (1981)
- Yuki Nakajima – The Prophecies (1982)
- Munetaka Higuchi – Destruction ~破壊凱旋録~ (1983)
- Lumina Hayase – 甘い暴力〜 Violence Cat (1983)
- Takanori Jinnai – All Through the Night (1984)
- Mari Hamada – Misty Lady (1984)
- Ella – Ella USA (1994)
- X.Y.Z.→A – IV (2004)
- Atsushi Yokozeki – Jet Destiny (2014)
- ’Inori’m (2011) (Prayer) Producers: Kyoji Yamamoto, Alec Berfield created to provide relief for children victims of the 2011 Tsunami.

== Video games ==
- R: Rock'n Riders – in-game character, music
