= King Studio =

Recording studio in Petaling Jaya, Malaysia

- Type: Recording studio; Music production
- Industry: Music
- Founded: 1963; 63 years ago
- Founder: Ng Lian-Chin
- Headquarters: No. 5, Jalan 13/2, Seksyen 13, 46200 Petaling Jaya, Selangor Darul Ehsan, Malaysia.
- Key people: Ng Cheong Kien (CEO)
- Parent: Hup Hup Sdn. Bhd. (Life Records)

King Studio, (known legally as King Musical Industries Sdn. Bhd. and currently as King's Stage) is a recording and music production studio located in Seksyen 13, Petaling Jaya, Selangor, Malaysia. It was established in 1963 by Malaysian entrepreneur Ng Lian-Chin.

The facility housed a recording studio, mastering studio, audio editing suite, vinyl record pressing plant, and cassette duplication and printing operations; it was regarded as one of Malaysia's oldest recording studios and among the pioneers of vinyl record manufacturing in Malaysia.

== History ==
=== 1960s–1970s ===
King Musical Industries was established in 1963 by Ng Lian-Chin, founder of Hup Hup Sdn. Bhd. and the record label Life Records. King Studio was initially established to record artists signed to Life Records before expanding its services to artists from other record labels, including BMG and EMI.

King Studio was also among the few local vinyl record manufacturers recognised by major international record labels, including CBS Records International, WEA International Inc., and EMI. During the 1960s and 1970s, a number of prominent artists recorded at the studio, including P. Ramlee, Teresa Teng, and Frances Yip.

=== 1980s–1990s ===
In 1985, Ng Cheong Kien, son of the founder, assumed management of King Studio. Under his leadership, the studio expanded its facilities, increasing the number of recording rooms from two to five.

From the late 1980s to the late 1990s, King Studio reached its peak and became closely associated with the Malaysian rock kapak scene. Numerous rock bands and artists recorded at the studio, including Search, Wings, XPDC, Lefthanded and Ella. During this period, King Studio was among the first recording studios in Malaysia to undertake live concert recordings for artists such as Awie and Indonesian singer Hetty Koes Endang.

In 1990, King Studio ceased operations of its vinyl record manufacturing plant after more than 20 years of operation. The closure was attributed to the decline of vinyl records as a broadcast medium, as broadcasters such as RTM transitioned from vinyl records to compact discs. In the late 1990s, King Studio faced a challenging period following the 1997 Asian financial crisis and the decline in cassette tape sales.

=== 2000s–present ===
In the early 2000s, the emergence of digital recording studios posed challenges for King Studio, which continued to operate primarily with analogue equipment. In 2002, King Studio ceased in-house studio operations and began renting out its recording rooms to tenants. The studio is now known as King's Stage. The former vinyl printing hall has since been renovated into King's Hall Café, while one of the studios was converted into King's Stage Hall, a multipurpose event venue.

== Studios ==
Studio A

=== Studio A ===
Studio A is the oldest studio. The studio was used by P. Ramlee during the 1960s. It remains the only studio still in operation, and is currently rented to Rockstar Musika. Owned by former King Studio audio engineer Sarra King.

=== Studio B ===
Studio B was one of the main studios. It has since been closed.

=== Studio C ===
Studio C was the most popular studio. Previously used by Search to record their hit song "Isabella". It is currently rented out to a local youth creative organization, TeenEdge Malaysia.

=== Studio D ===
Studio D was one of the main studios. It has since been closed.

=== Studio E ===
Studio E was one of the main studios. It has since been closed.

== Notable artists ==
Artists known to have recorded at King Studio include:

- P. Ramlee
- Teresa Teng
- Frances Yip
- Sudirman Arshad
- M. Nasir
- Search
- XPDC
- Lefthanded
- Ella
- Alleycats
- Sharifah Aini
- Jamal Abdillah
- Hetty Koes Endang
- Butterfingers
- Francissca Peter
- Ning Baizura

== Legacy ==
King Studio is regarded as an important institution in the Malaysian music industry. In addition to serving as a major recording facility for several decades, it helped develop numerous songwriters, music arrangers, audio engineers, music producers, musician and other recording professionals. Including Dato Ramli M.S., Peter Chong, Jennifer Thompson and Zairi Saturnine. Who later contributed to the growth of Malaysia's music and entertainment industries.
